= Abbaye Saint-Benoît de Koubri =

Benedictine monastery in Burkina Faso

Monastery information
- Other names: Abbey of St Benedict; Koubri Abbey
- Order: Subiaco Congregation, Order of Saint Benedict
- Established: 1961
- Dedication: Benedict of Nursia
- Diocese: Roman Catholic Archdiocese of Ouagadougou

People
- Founder: Monastery of Toumliline
- Abbot: André Ouédraogo
- Prior: Michel Kaboré

Site
- Location: Koubri Department, Kadiogo Province, Burkina Faso

Abbaye Saint-Benoît de Koubri, Koubri, Kadiogo Province, Burkina Faso, is a Benedictine monastery of the Subiaco Congregation. Founded in 1961, the monastery is located around 30 km from Ouagadougou, the capital of Burkina Faso. As of 2000, the monastery was home to 27 monks, under the leadership of Abbot Fr André Ouédraogo.

== History ==
Like Monastère Bénédictin Sainte-Marie, Abbaye Saint-Benoît de Koubri was founded by monks from the priory of Toumliline, Morocco, upon request of local participants to one of the International Meetings hosted in Toumliline. Established in 1961, by 1975 the monastery had gained independent status. In 1985, the community elected its first ethnically African superior.

When a Benedictine monastery in Zagnanado, Benin, was closed in 1989, the monastic community at Koubri took in six of the young monks. After nine years of formation at the abbey, these monks returned to Hékanmè in Benin's Archdiocese of Cotonou to restart monastic life there.

== Apostolic Work ==
In the Benedictine spirit, the monks of Koubri attempt to maintain self-sufficiency by means of manual labor. At the monastery, such work takes place at fruit plantations (banana, mango, grapefruit), a chicken farm, a joiner's and welder's workshop, and on a dairy farm (reputed to be one of Burkina Faso's best).

The monks also administer a guest house and retreat facilities for visitors, and provide meeting-space for Catholic Action. The monastery strives to offer an environment of silence and prayer of which local Christians may take advantage.

== Dependencies ==
In 1998, the monks of Koubri established Mont Tabor de Hékanmè in Attogon, Benin. The monastery includes seven monks and remains dependent on the Abbaye Saint-Benoît de Koubri.

== Personnel ==
As of 2000, the community at Koubri included 27 monks, five of whom were ordained priests. The monks of Abbaye Saint-Benoît de Koubri are under the leadership of Abbot André Ouédraogo. The abbot is assisted in his duties by the monastery's prior, Michel Kaboré.

== See also ==
- Order of Saint Benedict
- Subiaco Congregation
- Roman Catholicism in Burkina Faso
