= Subiaco Cassinese Congregation =

International group of Benedictine abbeys

The Subiaco Cassinese Congregation is an international union of Benedictine houses (abbeys and priories) within the Benedictine Confederation. It developed from the Subiaco Congregation, which was formed in 1867 through the initiative of Dom Pietro Casaretto, O.S.B., as a reform of the way of life of monasteries of the Cassinese Congregation, formed in 1408, toward a stricter contemplative observance, and received final approval in 1872 by Pope Pius IX. After discussions between the two congregations at the start of the 21st century, approval was given by Pope Benedict XVI in 2013 for the incorporation of the Cassinese Congregation into its offshoot, the Subiaco Congregation. The expanded congregation was given this new name.

== History ==
Father Casaretto (1810–1878) from the age of seventeen was a monk of the Abbey of Santa Maria del Monte which was a member of the ancient Cassinese Congregation of Benedictine monasteries. Due to his poor health later, after his ordination as a priest, he was advised to seek exclaustration (a temporary leave of absence for discernment). Instead, he accepted assignment to a parish which had been entrusted to the pastoral care of the Congregation, but only on condition of being accompanied by a few of his brother monks. Furthermore, his stipulation was that they be allowed to follow an exact observance of the monastic life as laid down in the Rule of St. Benedict. To be revived in this was the practice of perpetual abstinence from meat and the celebration of Matins at 2:00 a.m. This was seen as an act of defiance in some quarters, but Casaretto had won the confidence of Pope Pius IX and the King of Piedmont. His vision was fulfilled with the establishment of a small monastic community in 1843.

The new foundation received approbation within the Congregation in 1846 with the visit of the Abbot of their mother community. That same year, it also found support from the Vatican with its approval of 18 articles Casaretto had submitted to serve as shaping the character of the foundation. Additionally, he founded a small seminary nearby to prepare monks for serving overseas. This was a step away from the purely European focus of the Cassinese congregation.

Over the next few years, three other Cassinese monasteries joined Casaretto's experiment. At this point, the Cassinese Congregation formed these communities into a new Province of Subiaco, granting these communities a degree of autonomy. By 1867, monasteries in Belgium, England and France had also joined this new Province. That was the year that Casaretto had decided that conditions in the mother Congregation were such that a complete split would be best. For this he convened an extraordinary Diet, which declared such a break, and established the monasteries of the Province as the Cassinese Congregation of the Primitive Observance. One new feature of this congregation, breaking with monastic tradition, was the establishment of a single abbot for the congregation, titled the Abbot General, with the Superior of each monastery being titled simply a prior, who was to be elected triennially, rather than for life.

This step drew the criticism of excessive centralization of monastic life, but the new congregation thrived, and received final papal approval in 1872, only five years after its inauguration. Yet Casaretto's vision was not to survive intact. Within a few years of his death, a committee of Cardinals called an extraordinary General Chapter in 1880. In the course of this, they cancelled the congregational nature of the monastic religious vows and re-established both the lifetime office of Abbot as the Superior of each monastery and the practice of the monk's vowing stability in a single community.

Following decades saw the consolidation and expansion of the Congregation. Growing hostility by the governments of Italy and France saw temporary suppression of various abbeys. This led them to establish new foundations in Bengal, New Zealand and the Philippines by the end of the 19th century. The congregation was flourishing however, at the start of the 20th century, with the number of monks growing from about 1,000 in 1920 to over 1,400 by 1937. New foundations were taking place, but this growth also came through the affiliation of the formerly Anglican monastery of Prinknash Abbey which chose to affiliate itself with this Congregation, after its conversion to the Catholic Church.

The Spanish Civil War, followed soon after by World War II, saw a change in fortunes of the Congregation. Widespread destruction and dispersal of religious communities did not spare the monks. The entire community of "El Pueyo" was murdered during this conflict. Growth was able to resume after these conflicts, especially in the French province, which made new foundations in Asia and Africa. In 1959, the General Chapter of the Congregation chose to re-take its original name of Subiaco.

== Current status ==
As of 2021, the Congregation consists of 64 monasteries, with another 45 women's houses affiliated or "aggregated". There are 1,250 members located in 24 countries.

The congregation was formed with the aim of rediscovering the ancient simplicity of the monastic life, which had become obscured over the centuries. As such, its houses tend to be focused more on an enclosed contemplative life rather than pastoral involvement with the larger community through the operations of schools or parishes. Compared to the other member congregations of the Benedictine Confederation (apart from the Ottilien Congregation), the Subiaco Confederation is one of the most internationally diverse, due to the widespread missionary activity of its abbeys.

The residence of the Abbot President of the congregation is at the Abbey of St. Ambrose (Italian: Sant'Ambrogio della Massima) in Rome. It was founded by the sister of St. Ambrose in the 4th century as a monastery of nuns.

On Thursday, September 22, 2016, capitulars of the General Chapter meeting in Rome, elected as the new Abbot President, Abbot Guillermo Arboleda Tamayo. He is the first Abbot President of the Congregation from the Americas. He was born in 1956, ordained priest in 1980, and professed as a monk of Santa María de la Epifanía (Guatapé) in 1986. He previously served as Abbot of the Abbey of Santa Maria de la Asunción (Envigado) and Administrator of Santa María de la Epifanía (Guatapé).

== Structure of the Congregation ==
The congregation is currently made up of:

Eight provinces: the Italian Province, the English Province, the Flemish Province, the French Province, the Spanish Province, the African and Madagascar Province, and the Vietnamese Province
The Philippine Pro-Province (2 houses)
Extra-provincial monasteries, subject directly to the Abbot President of the Congregation
Monasteries of Women

As to membership, the most recent Catalogus Monasteriorum published by the Benedictine Confederation (2015) notes the following (the figures cited do not include novices, oblates, or temporary professed):

=== Italian Province ===
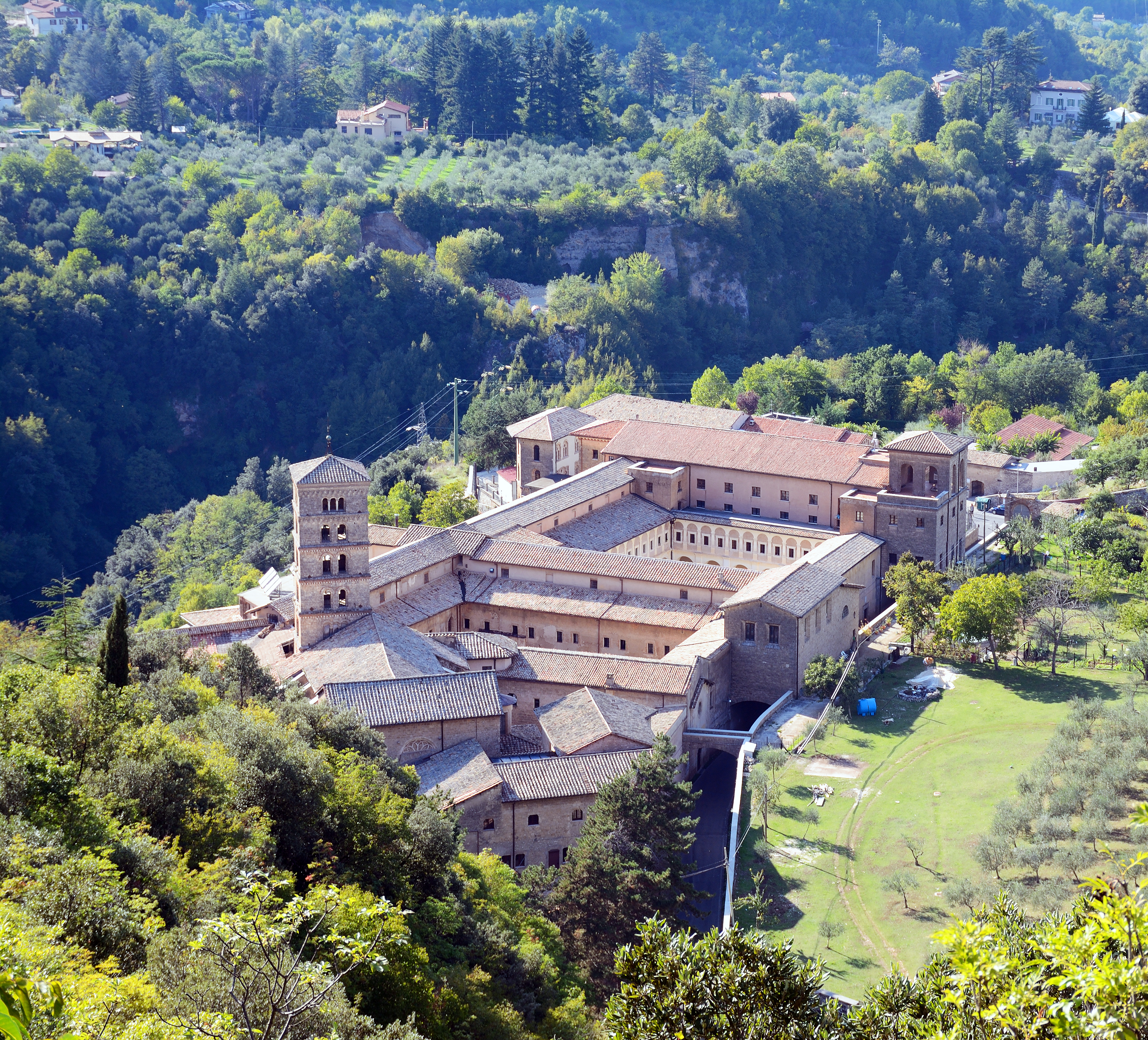
Aerial view of Subiaco Abbey

- Archabbey of Monte Cassino (6th century): 13 monks
- Monastery of St. Scholastica and Sacro Speco (6th century) Subiaco: 19 monks
- Abbey of St. Justina, Padua (970): 15 monks
- Abbey of St. John the Evangelist, Parma (980): 10 monks
- Abbey of the Holy Trinity, Cava (1011): 8 monks
- Abbey of St. James the Greater, Pontida (1076): 14 monks
- Praglia Abbey, Praglia (1080): 44 monks
  - Sadhu Benedict Math, Maheshwarapash, Daulatpur, Bangladesh (1990): (dependent on Praglia)
  - Abbey of St. Gregory the Great, Venice (982): 3 monks (dependent on Praglia)
- Abbey of St. Mary of Montevergine, Montevergine (1124): 14 monks
  - Abbey of St. Peter, Assisi (970): 5 monks (dependent on Montvergine)
- Abbey of St. Martin, Palermo (1347): 10 monks
- St. Mary's Abbey, Finalpia, Finale Ligure (1477): 13 monks
  - Priory of Saints Martin and Benedict, Pegli: 2 monks (dependent on Finalpia)
- Abbey of St. Mary of the Stairs, Noci (1930): 15 monks
- Abbey of St. Peter of Sorres, Borutta (1955): 10 monks
- Abbey of St. Mary of Farfa, Farfa (6th century): 6 monks
  - Abbey of St. Peter, Perugia (966): 5 monks (dependent on Farfa)
- Monastery of Saints Paul and Andrew, Novalesa (726): 7 monks
- Monastery of St. Peter, Modena (983): 8 monks
- Abbey of St. Mary of the Mountain, Cesena (10th century): 7 monks (dependent on Modena)
- Monastery of Our Lady of Miracles, Miraculi (1925): 8 monks
- Monastery of Saints Peter and Paul, Germagno (1974): 10 monks
- Monastery of Benedictine G.B. Dusmet, Nicolosi: 4 monks
- Monastic Community of the Most Holy Trinity, Dumenza (1989): 9 monks

=== English Province ===
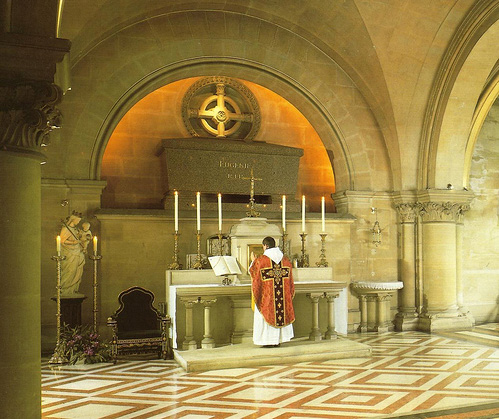
Tomb of Empress Eugénie in St Michael's Abbey, Farnborough

- Pluscarden Abbey, Moray (1230): 21 monks
  - St. Mary's Monastery, Petersham, Massachusetts (1987): 4 monks (dependent on Pluscarden)
- St. Augustine's Abbey, Chilworth (1861): 10 monks; formerly at Ramsgate
- St. Michael's Abbey, Farnborough (1895): 10 monks
- Prinknash Abbey, Gloucestershire (1896): 5 monks
- Sisters of the Blessed Virgin Mary, Aston Hall, Aston-by-Stone, Staffordshire (2013): 6 nuns; formerly at Kingstanding, Birmingham; part of the Personal Ordinariate of Our Lady of Walsingham
- Monastery of Christ in the Desert, Abiquiu, New Mexico (1964): 27 monks
  - Monastery of Nuestra Senora de la Soledad, San Miguel, Mexico (1987): 10 monks (dependent on Christ in the Desert)
  - Monasterio Benedictino De Santa María y Todos Los Santos, Texin, Telocelo, Veracruz, Mexico (1997): 10 monks (dependent on Christ in the Desert)
  - Monastery of Thien Tam, Kerens, Texas (2009): 6 monks (dependent on Christ in the Desert)
- Monastery of the Holy Cross, Chicago, Illinois (1989): 7 monks
- Monastery of Kristo Buase, Techiman (1989), priory sui juris i.e., granted independent status in 2016: 12 monks

=== Flemish Province ===
- Affligem Abbey, Affligem, Belgium (1062): 3 monks
- Dendermonde Abbey, Dendermonde, Belgium (1837): 11 monks
- St. Peter's Abbey, Steenbrugge, Belgium (1094): 4 monks
- St. Benedict's Abbey, Pietersburg, South Africa (1910): 14 monks
- Keizersberg Abbey (Regina Coeli), Leuven, Belgium (1899): 5 monks
- Abbey of St. Paul, Teteringen/Oosterhout (1907): 8 monks
- St. Willibrord's Abbey, Slangenburg, Doetinchem, Netherlands (1945): 8 monks
  - Sint-Maartenskommuniteit, Tilburg, Netherlands: 3 monks (dependent on St. Willibrord's Abbey)

=== French Province ===
- Abbey of la Pierre-qui-Vire, Saint-Léger-Vauban, France (1850): 46 monks
  - Chauveroche Priory, France (1980): 6 monks (dependent on La Pierre-qui-Vire)
- Abbey of Our Lady of Belloc, Urt, France (1875): 27 monks
- Landévennec Abbey, France (1878): 20 monks
  - Monastery of Morne-Saint-Benoît, Port-au-Prince, Haïti (1981): 4 monks (dependent on Landévennec)
- Abbey of St. Benedict of En-Calcat Abbey, Dourgne, France (1890): 52 monks
  - Monastery of St. Mary, Bouakè, Côte d’Ivoire (1960): 14 monks (dependent on Calcat Abbey)
- Tournay Abbey, Tournay, France (1934): 20 monks
- Fleury Abbey, Saint-Benoît-sur-Loire, France (630): 32 monks

=== Hispanic Province ===
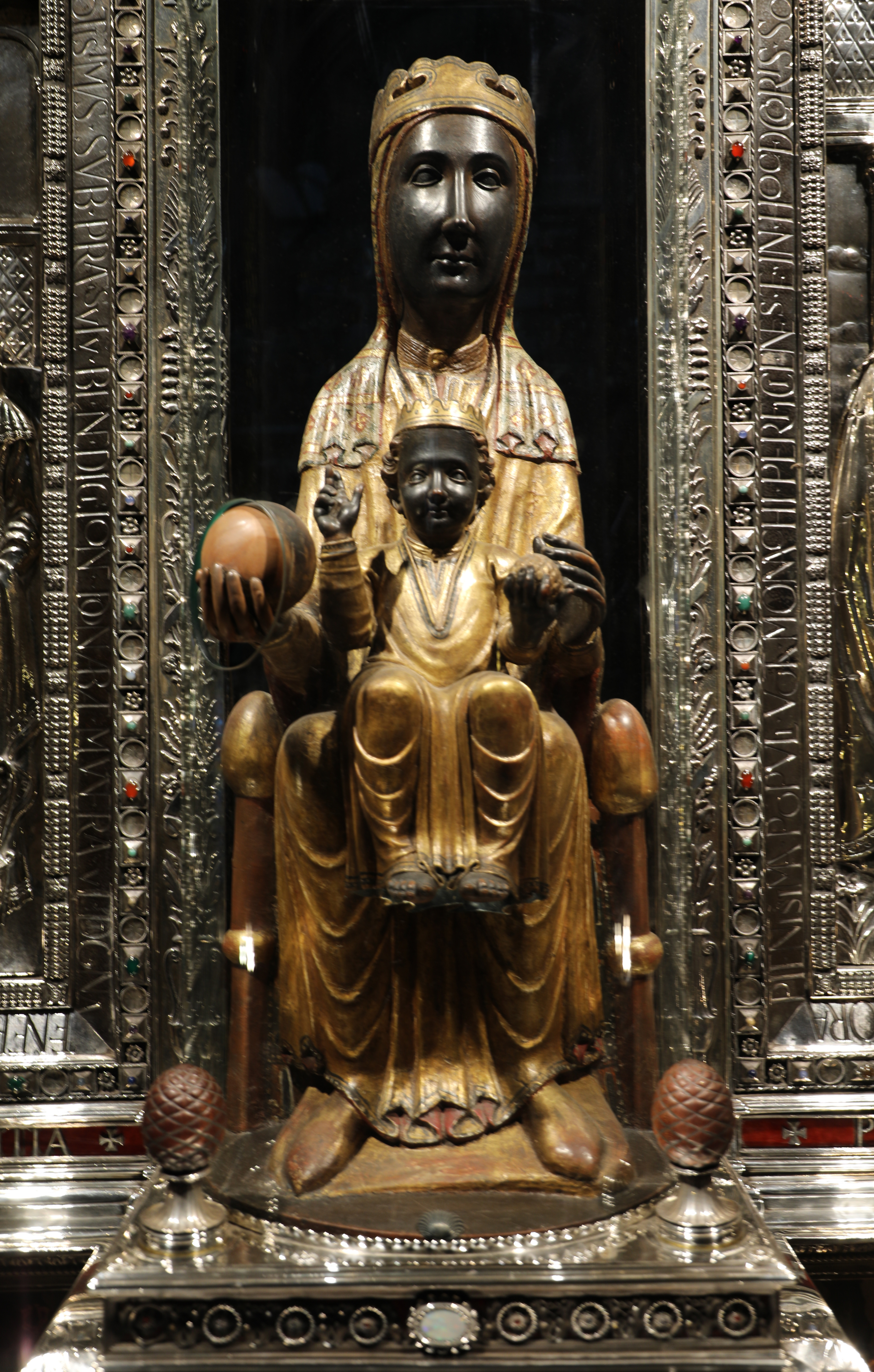
Our Lady of Montserrat

- Abbey of Saint Julián of Samos, Lugo, Galicia, Spain (655; 960): 19 monks
  - Monastery of Mayagüez, Puerto Rico: 5 monks (dependent on Samos)
- Valvanera Abbey, La Rioja, Spain (900): 12 monks
- Abbey of Saint Mary of Montserrat, Barcelona, Spain (1025): 76 monks
  - Abbey of Saint Michael of Cuxa, Codalet, France: 5 monks (dependent on Montserrat)
  - Monastery of Saint Mary (Santuari del Miracle), El Solsonès, Catalonia, Spain (1899): 6 monks (dependent on Montserrat)
- Estibaliz Priory, Estibaliz, Álava, Spain (1923): 7 monks
- Monastery of Saint Mary of El Paular, Rascafria, Madrid, Spain (1954): 8 monks
- Abbey of Saint Mary of Assumption, Envigado, Colombia (1954): 15 monks
- Monastery of Saint Mary of the Epiphany, Guatapé, Colombia (1968): 27 monks
- Monasterio de Santa Teresa de Jesús, Lazkao, Spain (1968): 8 monks
- Resurrection Abbey, Ponta Grossa (Brasil): 23 monks

=== Africa and Madagascar Province ===
- Bouaké Priory, Bouaké, Côte d'Ivoire: 19 monks
- Mahitsy Monastery, Madagascar (1955): 23 monks
- Abbey of the Ascension, Dzogbégan, Danyi-Apéyémé, Togo (1961): 32 monks
- Koubri Abbey, Koubri, Burkina Faso (1963): 23 monks
- Mont Tabor de Hékanmè, Attogon, Benin (1998): 7 monks (dependent on Koubri)

=== Vietnamese Province ===
- Thien An Abbey, Huế (1940): 43 monks (and 3 secular oblates)
- Thien Hoa Priory, Đắk Lắk (1962): 12 monks
- Thien Binh Priory, Đồng Nai (1970): 51 monks
- Thien Phuoc Priory, Ho Chi Minh City (1972): 55 monks (and 28 secular oblates)

=== Philippine Pro-Province ===
- Abbey of Our Lady of Montserrat, Manila (1895): 37 monks (and 40 secular oblates)
- Abbey of the Transfiguration, Malaybalay (1981): 14 monks (and 1 Novice; 1 Simply Professed; 24 Secular Oblates; 13 Oblate Novices. Elevated to an abbey by decree of the abbot president, Rt. Rev. Guillermo L. Arboleda, OSB on 2 February 2017. The founder and first abbot elected is Rt. Rev. Eduardo Africa, OSB.)

=== Extra-provincial ===
- Kornelimünster Abbey, Aachen (814): 9 monks
- Abbey of the Holy Trinity, New Norcia, Western Australia, (1846): 12 monks (and 30 secular oblates)

== Sources and external links ==
- Subiaco Cassinese Congregation official website
