= Monastery of Toumliline =

Former Benedictine monastery in Toumliline, Morocco

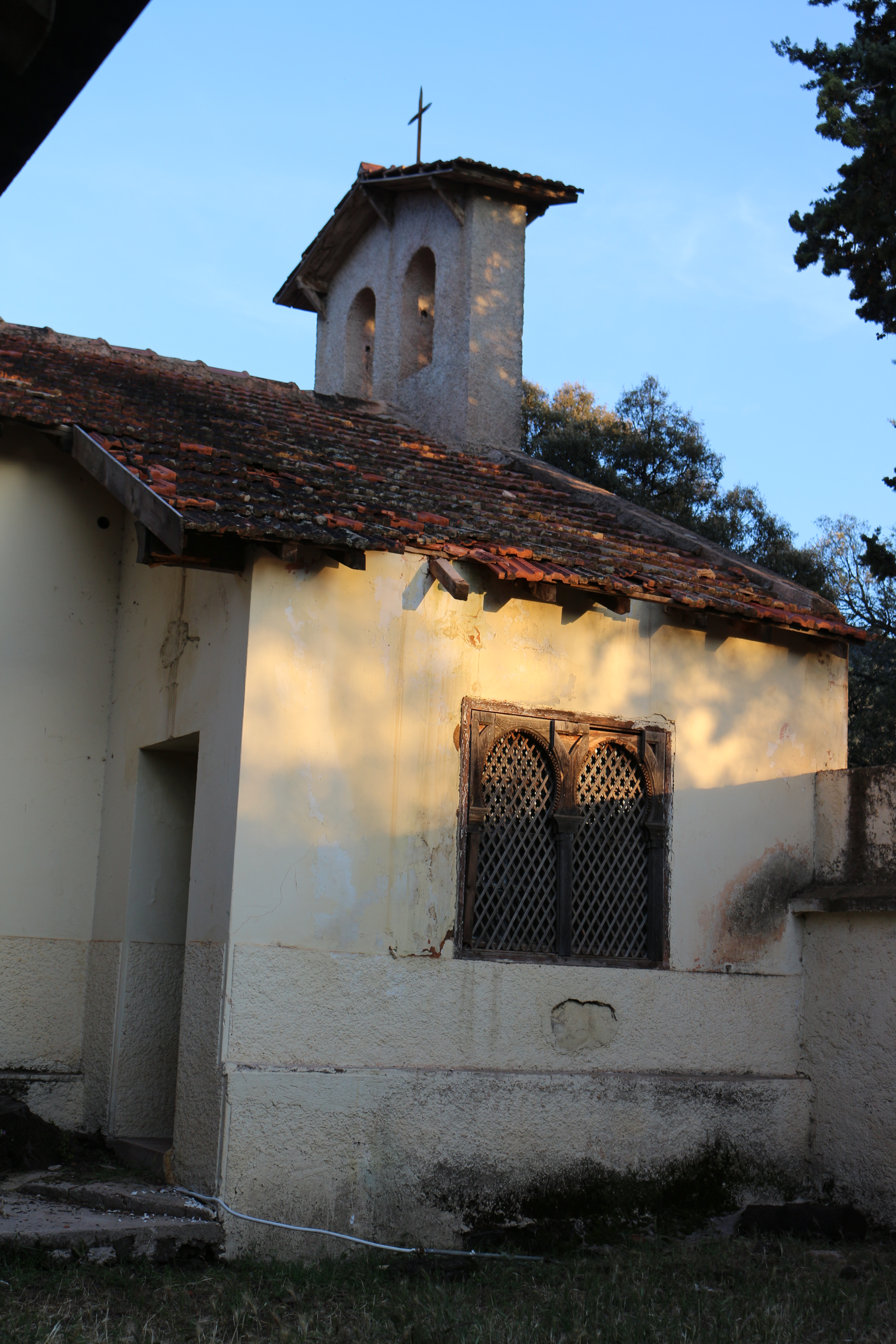
- Church of the monastery
- Interactive map of Monastery of Toumliline

Monastery information
- Other name: Monastère de Toumliline
- Order: Benedictines
- Established: 1988
- Mother house: En-Calcat Abbey
- Dedication: Christ the King
- Diocese: Rabat

Site
- Location: Toumliline, Souss-Massa-Drâa, Morocco
- Coordinates: 33°25′14″N 5°12′28″W
- Public access: Yes

The Monastery of Toumliline (French: Monastère de Toumliline) was a Benedictine monastery in Toumliline, Morocco. It was the only Benedictine monastery in Morocco and hosted the International Meetings, an annual interfaith conference.

== History ==
=== Foundation ===
The monastery was founded in 1952 when 20 Benedictine monks from the abbey of En-Calcat arrived in Toumliline upon invitation of the archbishop of Rabat. At the time, the region was known for insecurity as there was a growing national movement and the European monks were seen as suspect. While the French authorities tried to persuade the monks to convert the local Berber population, the monks refused to cooperate, explaining that their purpose was to lead a contemplative life and that any convert would be an outcast in their own country.

Only after a year did the local population make contact with the community and a school was opened as was a dispensary for the sick. When in Summer 1954 a group of Arab nationalists from a nearby detention camp was forced to build a water pipe between Toumliline and Azrou, the monks under abbot Dom Denis Martin served the overseers as well as the prisoners mint tea. One of the prisoners, Driss M'hammedi, would become foreign minister after the independence of Morocco.

=== Prime and the International Meetings ===
Starting in 1952, Dom Denis Martin started to organise annual pilgrimages to Toumliline for young Catholics. Each had a certain topic: in 1952, "Reflect on our role together: discover and respect, love and serve Moroccan culture" (50 participants), in 1953, "How to connect with our Jewish and Muslim brothers and sisters" (200 participants) and in 1955 "Warnings against syncretism by those insufficiently trained in faith in Christ" (500 participants). When additionally in 1955 a nearby summer camp was closed by French authorities on suspicion of nationalist activities, the organisers asked the monks to host them, the monks welcomed them and gave them talks on diverse subjects. This sparked the idea of creating summer cultural sessions that would be termed "International Meeting".

In August 1956, the first "International Meeting" took place at the monastery shortly after the French colonial rule ended. Mohammed V, who appreciated the solidarity of the Catholic and Protestant churches with the Moroccans during their independence fight and maintained good relations with archbishop Louis Lefèbvre, served as patron for these conferences. Though there were fears that Morocco's Liberation army would attack the attendance, the Liberation army protected them by an arrangement of two friends of Dom Martin: the minister of interior and the governor of Rabat. During that first meeting, 850 Christians, Jews and Muslims from twelve nationalities participated in the 52 lectures.

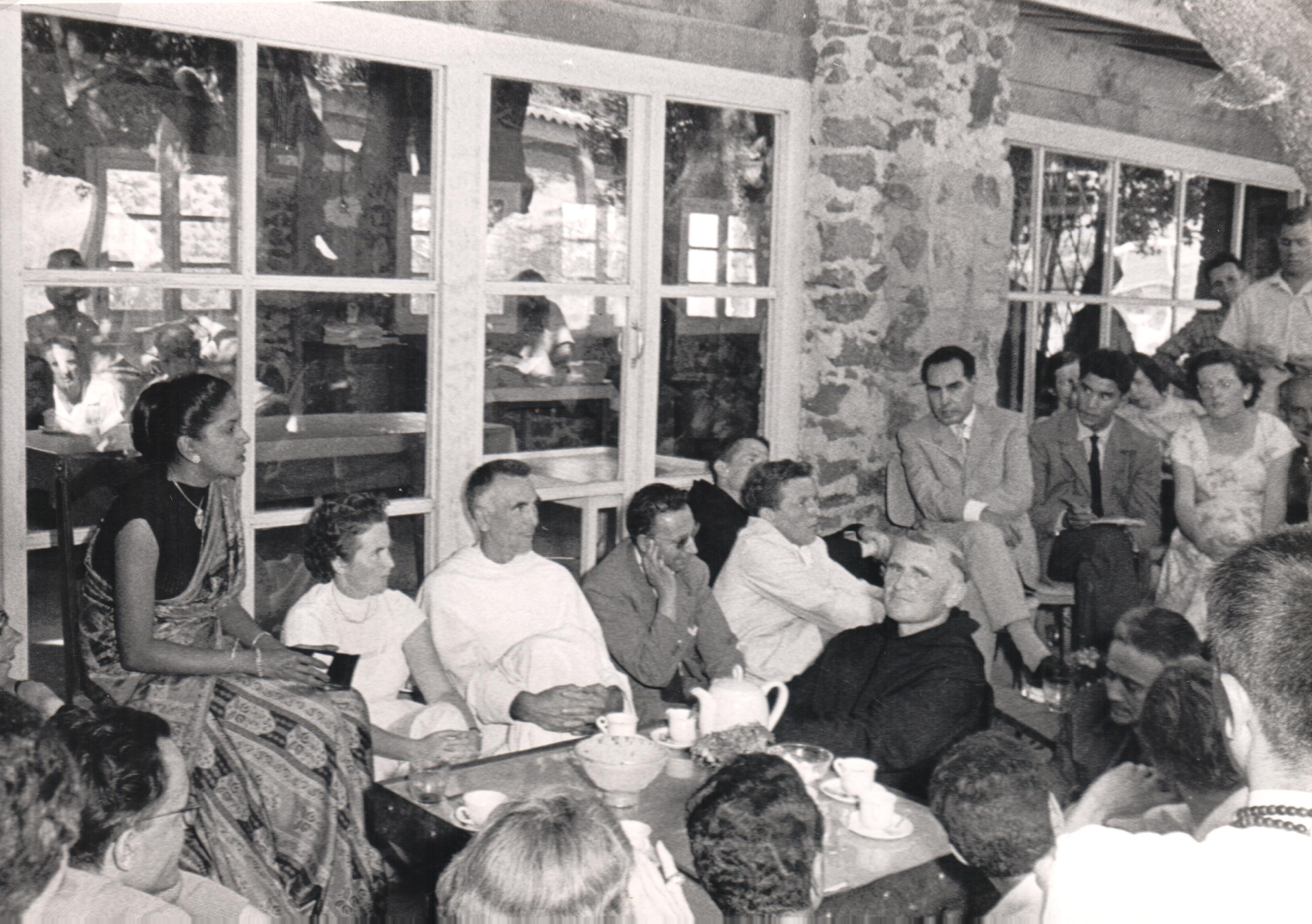
Debate between conference participants

Many prestigious professors from universities all over the world, including Harvard, Sorbonne, Cairo, Baghdad and Japan attended the sessions. These included the Jewish-French philosopher Emmanuel Levinas, the French ethnologist Germaine Tillion, the Iranian Islamic scholar Seyyed Hossein Nasr, Catholic Islamicists Louis Massignon and Louis Gardet. Other people in attendance included the Arab socialist Mehdi Ben Barka, the American philosopher F. S. C. Northrop as well as the Moroccan princess Lala Aicha who gave a talk on the role of women building the new Morocco. A high Muslim official went so far to call Toumliline "a lesson and a school, a center for cohabitation between Christian and Moslem.

In the 1960s, the monks founded upon the request of Sub-Saharan attendance two monasteries in the Ivory Coast and Burkina Faso: St. Marie de Bouake and St Benoît de Koubri. Christian de Chergé, who would later become one of the murdered monks of the Abbey of our Lady of the Atlas in Algeria, spent during this time several summer holidays in the monastery. Thomas Merton, who met Dom Denis Martin (whom he said was "experimenting with a new kind of monastic life"), expressed in 1963 in a letter to Jean Leclercq his admiration for the monastery and his desire to go there. At its peak, the monastery numbered forty monks.

=== End ===
The final conference, titled "International Co-operation", took place in 1964. In 1965, in response to leftist protests, King Hassan II dissolved the parliament and declared a state of exception. While he suppressed political parties, he also made it clear to the monks that because of their liberalism and influence on the Berber countryside their presence was not welcome any more. At the same time, the monks were having economic difficulties as their water supply dried and they were swindled out of all their capital. By 1968, the community consisted of only seven monks and in June that year they were told by the king they had to leave the monastery. That winter, the final three monks returned to France and though some hope had remained to return, the monastery was sold to the government.

== Legacy ==
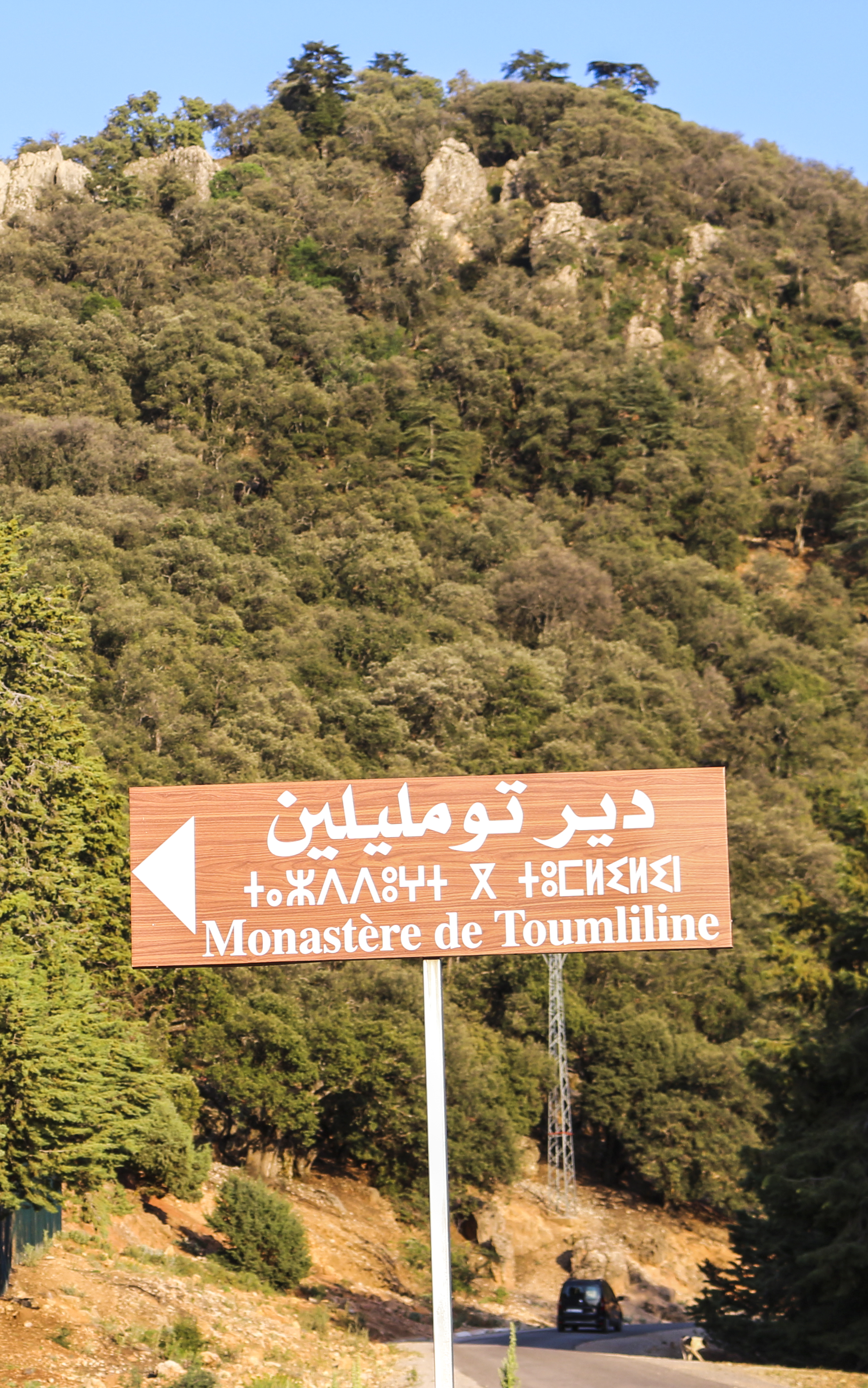
Monastery panel

Though the monastery closed down, the Catholic Church continued Christian-Muslim dialogue, opening an inter-faith and study center in Rabat in 1980-81 and supporting the formation of the Groupe de Recherche Islamo-Chrétien in 1977 which still exists today.

The buildings of the monastery were used for the filming of the movie "Of Gods and Men" in 2010. For this purpose, the film crew reconstructed some of the buildings and put red stained glass into the disused chapel. The survivors of the Trappist community lived at this point in the nearby priory of our Lady of Atlas where the film crew visited them during the filming.

As of 2022, the buildings were again in a state of poor conservation. Thus, in May 2022 the foundation of "Memories for the Future" and the Department of Water and Forests signed an agreement to preserve the buildings and develop cultural tourism that enhances the exceptional heritage of the site. That same year, a conference took place between Moroccan and French organisations that agreed to hold another meeting of similar character at some point at the site of the monastery.

== Prior ==
- Dom Denis Martin

== See also ==
- Catholic Church in Morocco
- Monastery of Tazert
- Pontifical Council for Interreligious Dialogue
- Interfaith dialogue

== Sources ==
- Benargane, Yassine (7 June 2017). "Le 7 juin 1965, quand Hassan II déclarait l'état d'exception au Maroc". Yabiladi.com (in French). Archived from the original on 25 January 2022.
- Bicknell, Julia (9 November 2022). "'Spirit of Toumliline' Interfaith Inquiry Lives On 50 Years After Moroccan Monastery Closed". Religion Unplugged. Institute for Nonprofit News.
- Foster, Elizabeth A.; Greenberg, Udi (29 August 2023). Decolonization and the Remaking of Christianity. University of Pennsylvania Press. pp. 114–115. ISBN 978-1-5128-2497-1.
- O'Mahony, Anthony; Bowe, Peter (2006). Catholics in Interreligious Dialogue: Studies in Monasticism, Theology and Spirituality. Gracewing Publishing. p. 73. ISBN 978-0-85244-640-9.
- Merton, Thomas (14 November 1990). The School of Charity: The Letters Of Thomas Merton On Religious Renewal & Spiritual Direction. Farrar, Straus and Giroux. p. 179. ISBN 978-1-4299-6637-5.
- Nasr, Seyyed Hossein (2 September 2016). "Muslim Dialogue with the Church after Nostra Aetate". In Valkenberg, Pim; Cirelli, Anthony (eds.). Nostra Aetate. CUA Press. p. 105. ISBN 978-0-8132-2878-5.
- Patterson, Margot (13 June 2019). "The last monk of Tibhirine: 'God drove that history'". National Catholic Reporter.
- Pont, Fr. Daniel (December 2022). "Once upon a Time, there was a Monastery called Toumliline - Once upon a Time, there was a Monastery called Toumliline". dimmid.org. Dialogue Interreligieux Monastique / Monastic Interreligious Dialogue.
- "Monasticism: End Of An Adventure". Time. TIME USA, LLC. 23 May 1969.
