= Abbey of Saint Peter (Assisi) =

Church building in Assisi, Italy

- Abbazia di San Pietro
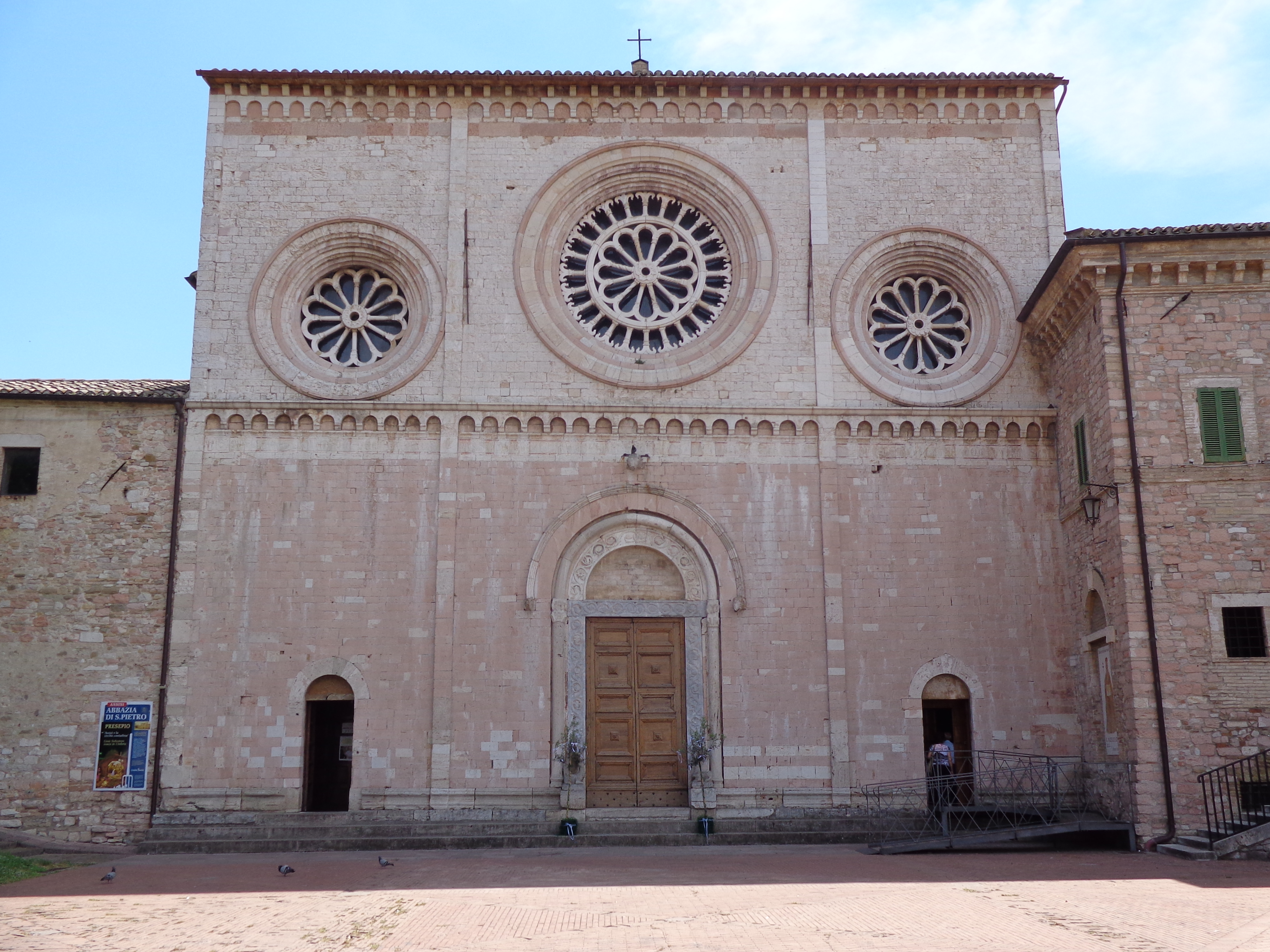
- Facade
- Abbey of Saint Peter
- 43°04′17″N 12°36′31″E
- Location: Assisi, Italy
- Denomination: Roman Catholic

History
- Dedication: Saint Peter
- Consecrated: 1253

Architecture
- Style: Romanesque, Gothic
- Groundbreaking: 10th century
- Completed: 1268

Administration
- Diocese: Diocese of Assisi

The Abbey of St. Peter is a Benedictine abbey in Assisi inhabited by a small community of monks belonging to the Cassinese Congregation. The monastery has supported a hospital for the sick, an agricultural colony, and an orphanage run by the Stigmata Sisters.

== History ==
The monastery of Saint Peter in Assisi was founded in the 10th century, and first documented in 1029. The building was divided into a nave with two aisles with arches supported by columns, and raised presbytery over the crypt. The present building was built over the earlier foundation by Cistercian monks and consecrated by Pope Innocent IV in 1253; the façade was completed in 1268. The monastery became a parish church in 1577 when Pope Gregory XIII expelled the monks. In 1613, Pope Paul V invited monks from the nearby Cassinese monastery of San Pietro in Perugia, making it a functional monastery once again.

== Architecture ==
=== Façade ===
The Romanesque façade was completed in 1268. It is rectangular, with three entries, each surmounted in the second tier by three Gothic rose windows. The two sections are separated by a cornice of hanging arches. The central portal is flanked by two stone lions.

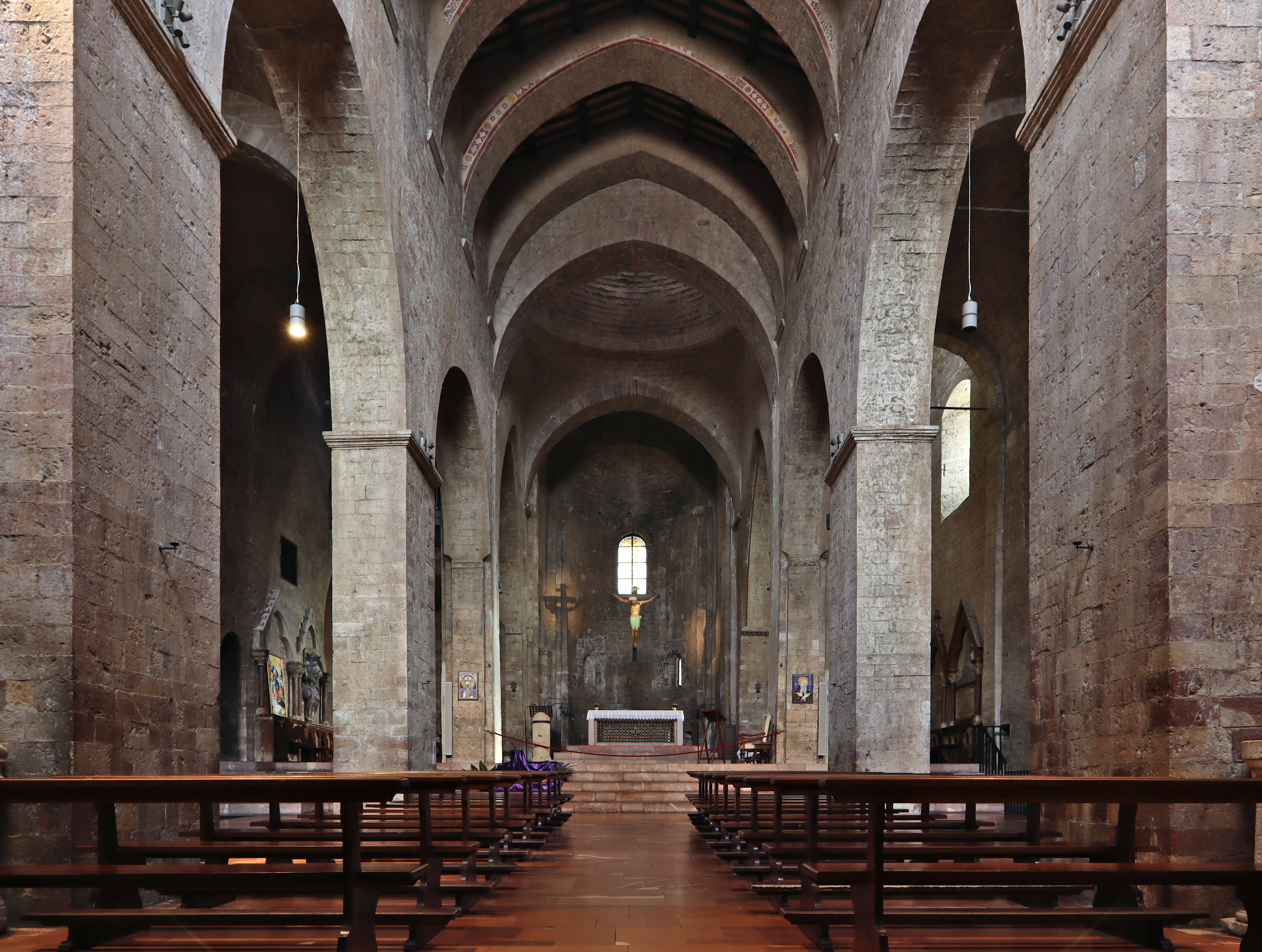
Interior of the main church

=== Interior ===
The interior has a central nave and two aisles in the Romanesque style, with Gothic influences. The aisles contain 14th-century tombs and frescoes. The interior was restored in 1954.

One tomb is that of Don Antonio Pennacchi (1782-1843), a diocesan priest of Assisi. He is locally revered as "the Ave Maria priest." Next to his tomb is a 12th-century fresco of a young St. Benedict holding the book of the Rule, supported by Saints Cyril and Methodius, apostles to the Slavs, and inventors of the Cyrillic alphabet.

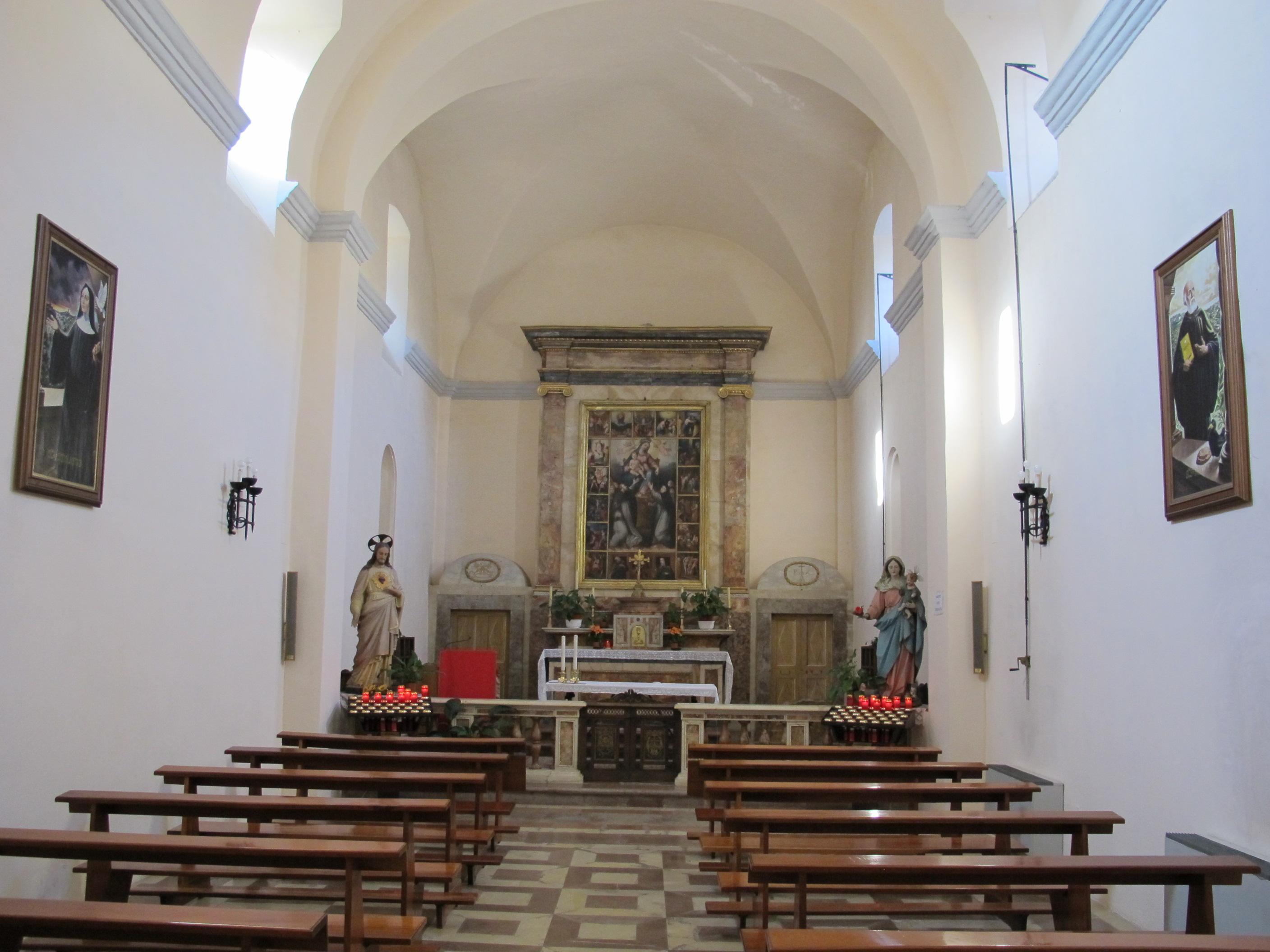
Rosary chapel

Just inside the entrance, to the left is the Chapel of the Rosary. The altar was rebuilt in 1831, and houses a painting of Our Lady of the Rosary.

==== Relics of Saint Vittorino ====
The urn of Saint Vittorino, a third-century bishop of Assisi and patron of the diocese, was made in 1954 for house his relics and those of other martyrs; it is in the high altar. The sarcophagus of Saint Vittorino and fellow martyrs are in the crypt.

== Museum ==
The museum is to the right of the monastery. Built on Roman ruins, these older rooms are used for exhibitions. The museum displays a collection of art, including ceramic works by contemporary artists relating to Saint Francis and the Nativity.

== Bibliography ==
- G. Troiano - A. Pompei, Illustrated Guide to Assisi, Franciscan Publishing House, Terni
- L. Santini, Assisi, Publishing Plurigraf, Terni-Narni
