= Abbey of Our Lady of Montserrat, Manila =

Roman Catholic monastery in Manila, Philippines

Abbey of Our Lady of Montserrat
- Benedictine Abbey of Our Lady of Montserrat
- Benediktinong Abadiya ng Mahal na Birhen ng Montserrat (Tagalog); Abadía Benedictina de Nuestra Señora de Montserrat (Spanish)
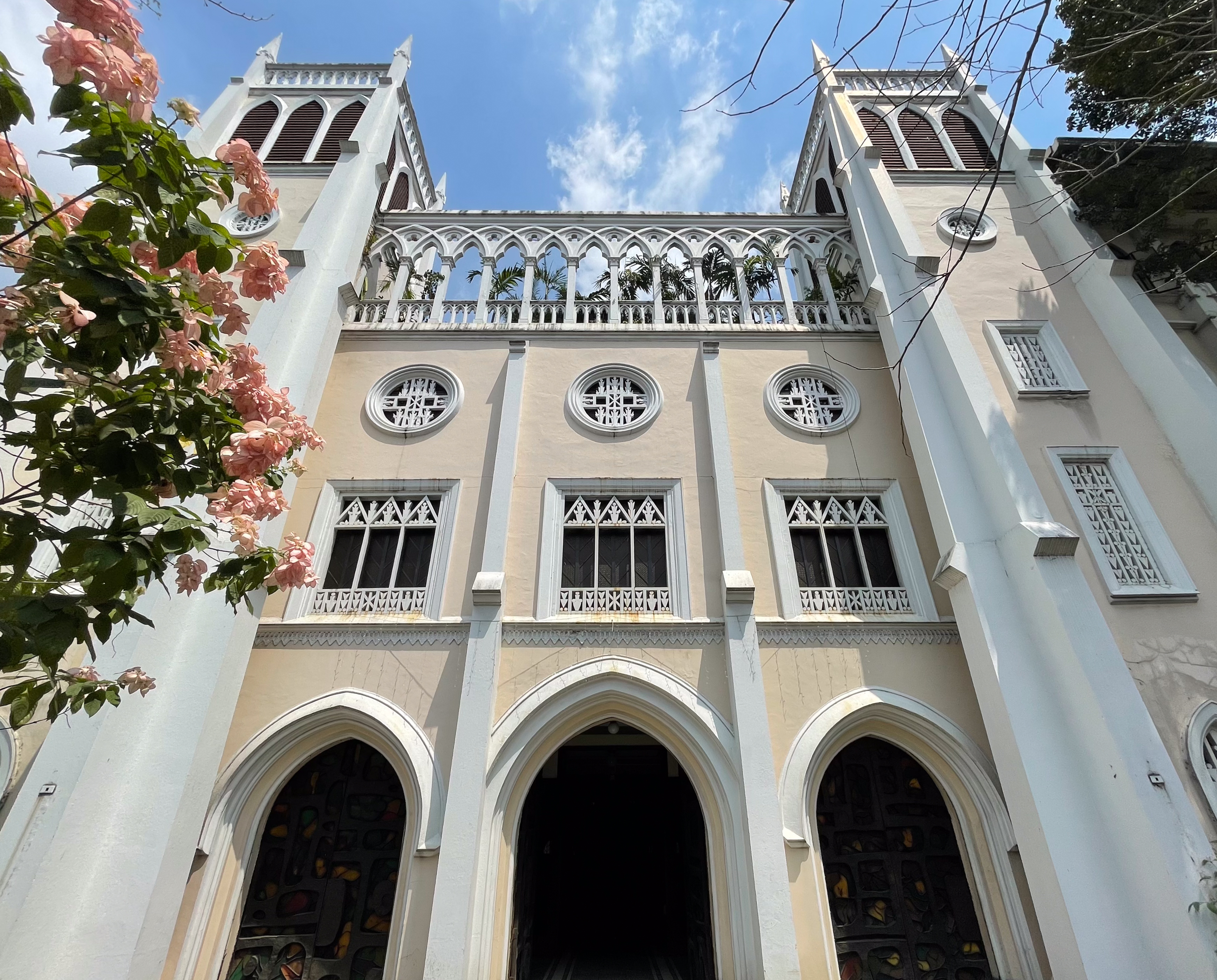
- Abbey facade in 2026
- Abbey of Our Lady of Montserrat
- 14°35′57″N 120°59′35″E
- Location: 638 Mendiola Street, San Miguel, Manila
- Country: Philippines
- Denomination: Roman Catholic
- Religious order: Benedictines
- Website: montserratmanila.org

History
- Status: Abbey
- Founded: 1895
- Founder: José Deas y Villar
- Dedication: Santo Niño de Praga; Nuestra Señora de Montserrat
- Consecrated: January 13, 1926

Architecture
- Functional status: Active (abbey and university church)
- Architect: George Asp
- Style: Neo-Gothic (exterior); Neo-Baroque (interior)
- Completed: January 13, 1926

Administration
- Archdiocese: Manila

Clergy
- Abbot: Austin Cadiz

The Benedictine Abbey of Our Lady of Montserrat, also known as the Manila Abbey, is a Benedictine men's monastery located on Mendiola Street in Manila, Philippines. The monastery was founded by monks from Spain in 1895, in the final years of the Spanish colonial era in the Philippines. The shrine is dedicated to the Blessed Virgin Mary under the title of Our Lady of Montserrat.

The resident monks, who belong to the Philippine Pro-Province of the Subiaco Cassinese Congregation (a part of the Benedictine Confederation), also operate San Beda University on the abbey's grounds.

== History ==
=== Origins ===
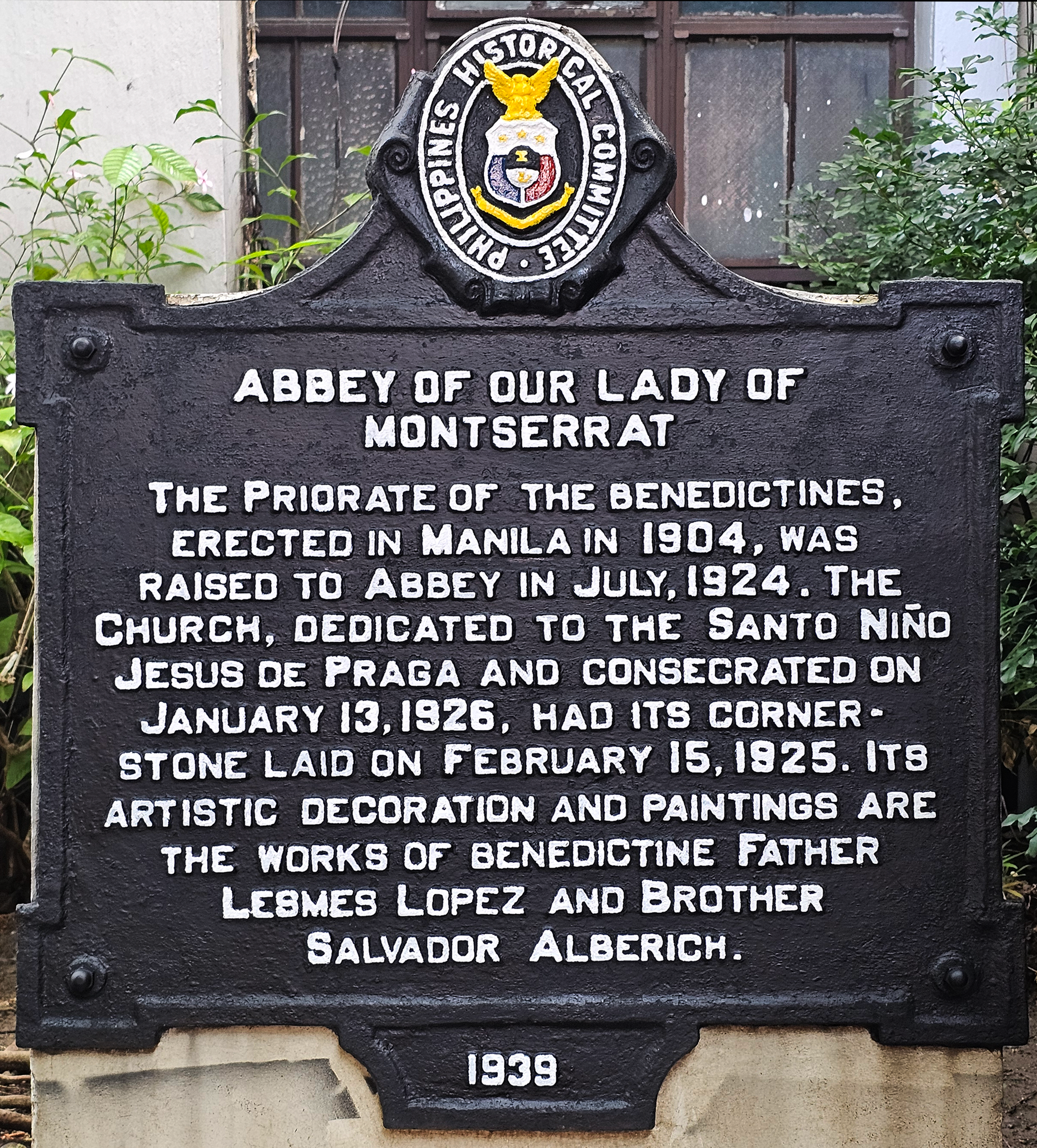
Historical marker installed by the Philippines Historical Committee in 1939 outside the church

In the 19th century, several anti-clerical governments in Spain took measures to suppress the many monasteries there. If they were not closed outright, communities were forbidden by the state to accept new candidates, with the goal of letting monastic communities die out. With time however, exceptions were made for monasteries that would operate in the far-flung regions still a part of Spain's empire, primarily the Philippines.

As a result of this incentive, the ancient Benedictine Abbey of Our Lady of Montserrat near Barcelona made the decision to establish a mission foundation in the area of Manila. The plan was for the community to follow the agrarian way of life which was part of the reform then under way by the recently formed Subiaco Congregation (forerunner of the present congregation) and provide pastoral care for the local population. On September 12, 1895, eight choir monks and six lay brothers, under the leadership of Dom José Deas y Villar, arrived in Manila. After being hosted by the local Jesuit community, the monks obtained property for themselves in Surigao, which they occupied on April 25 of the following year.

=== American period ===
The American occupation of the Philippines in 1898, in the course of the Spanish–American War, changed the new monastery's situation dramatically. Loss of financial support from the Spanish crown for the Catholic missions in the country left the community in desperate straits. Given that, and a desire on the part of the abbot of the community to counteract the new influence of Protestant missionaries, who had arrived under the protection of the American government, the monks decided to turn to education as their focus. On June 17, 1901, they opened San Beda College, named after the great English Benedictine scholar and saint, the Venerable Bede, on Arlegui Street. The curriculum consisted of elementary, secondary, and initial university studies, with graduates awarded either a Bachelor of Arts degree or a diploma in business. The college was accredited and affiliated by and to the Pontifical University of Santo Tomas in 1906.

By that time, the monastery grounds had become too small for the monks and the college, so the monks purchased land on Mendiola Street. In 1909, they entrusted the pastoral care of the region to Missionaries of the Sacred Heart from the Netherlands and moved to their current location, which they expanded in 1918. The cornerstone of the abbey church was laid on February 15, 1925, and it was completed and consecrated on January 13, 1926, to the Infant of Prague.

It was built with a Neo-Gothic exterior, with a Neo-Baroque interior painted by Dom Lesmes López, a Spaniard, and Brother Salvador Alberich. The pair worked on the abbey church from 1931 to 1939, leaving only the back wall of the nave above the entrance blank. Dom Lesmes López's paintings on the vaulted ceiling of the nave include the 16 allegories on the virtues, theology, and the church. The Apotheosis of the Holy Name of Jesus was painted over the sanctuary, while on its walls are eight panels on the Nativity of the Lord. Paintings of the Stations of the Cross are also seen within the interior of the church.

=== Present condition ===
By 1971, the monastic community had gone from a high of some 100 monks to a membership of 30.

In 2010, Aelred Nilo designed the final mural to fill the back wall of the nave, which was then executed by the Italian painter Francesco Giannini on 126 square metres (1,360 sq ft) of jute canvas. The mural depicts the history of the present congregation, as well as the resurrected Christ, saints, and various other religious figures, some based on real-life photographs.

== List of abbots ==
The abbey has been led by eight abbots throughout its history:

1. Raimundo Salinas (1925–1939)
2. Pedro Celestino Gusi (1947–1957) — Elected abbot president of the Subiaco Congregation
3. Wilfrido Rojo (1958–1962)
4. Bernardo Lopez (1962–1968)
5. Eduardo Africa (1980–1986) — First Filipino abbot
6. Andres Formilleza (1989–1998)
7. Tarcisio Narciso (2001–2013)
8. Austin Cadiz (2018–present)

== Gallery ==
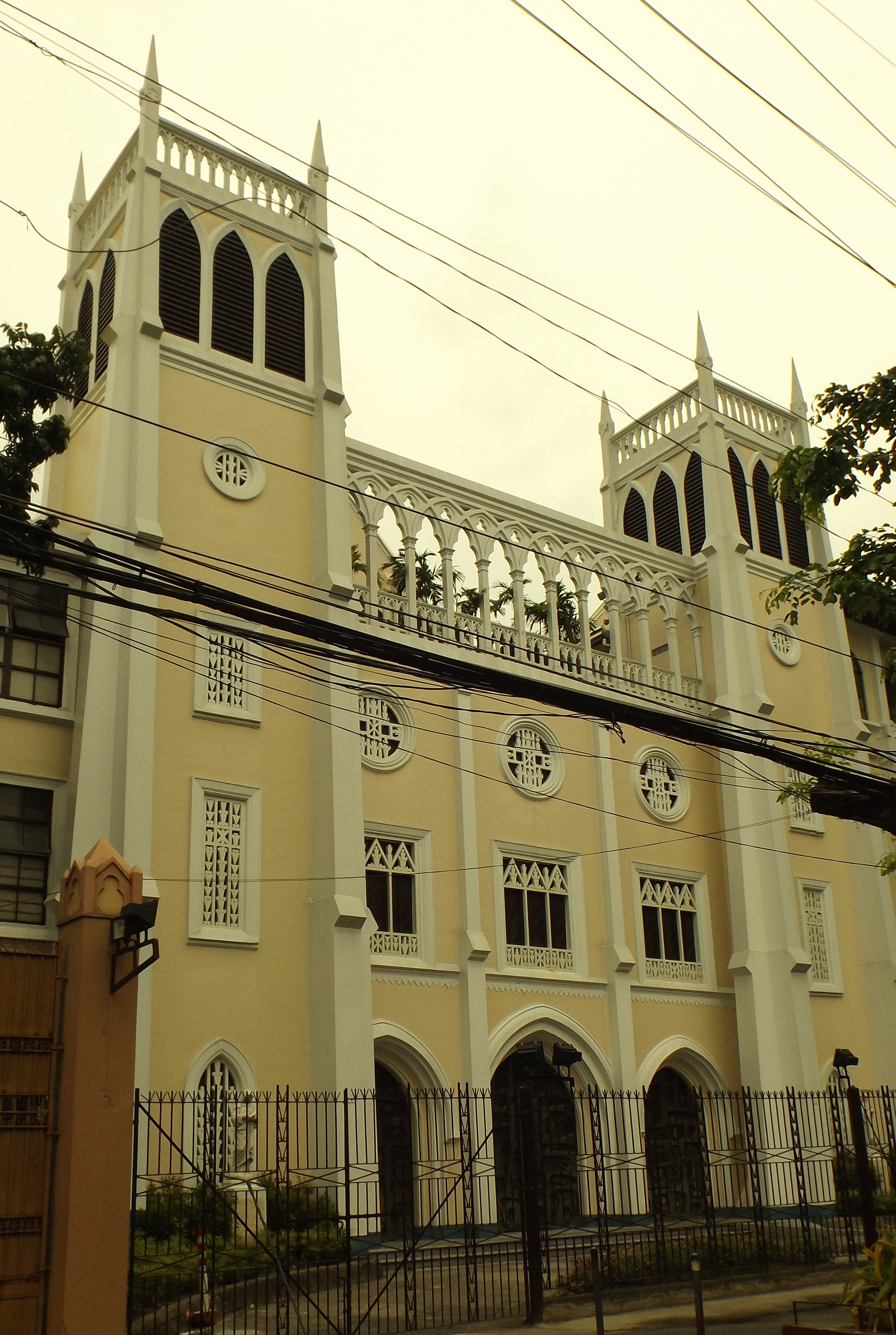
Façade

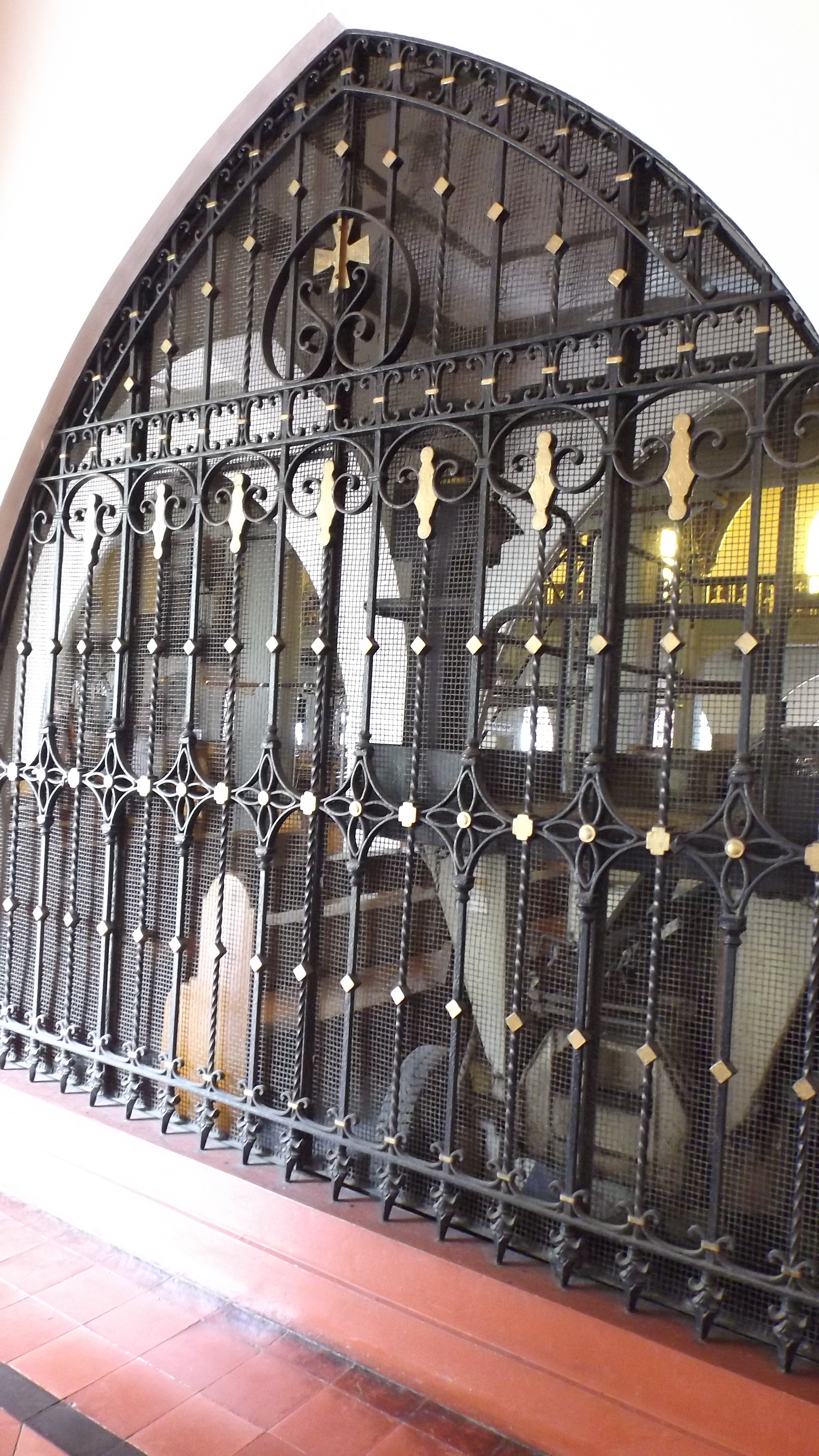
Details of the ground level windows

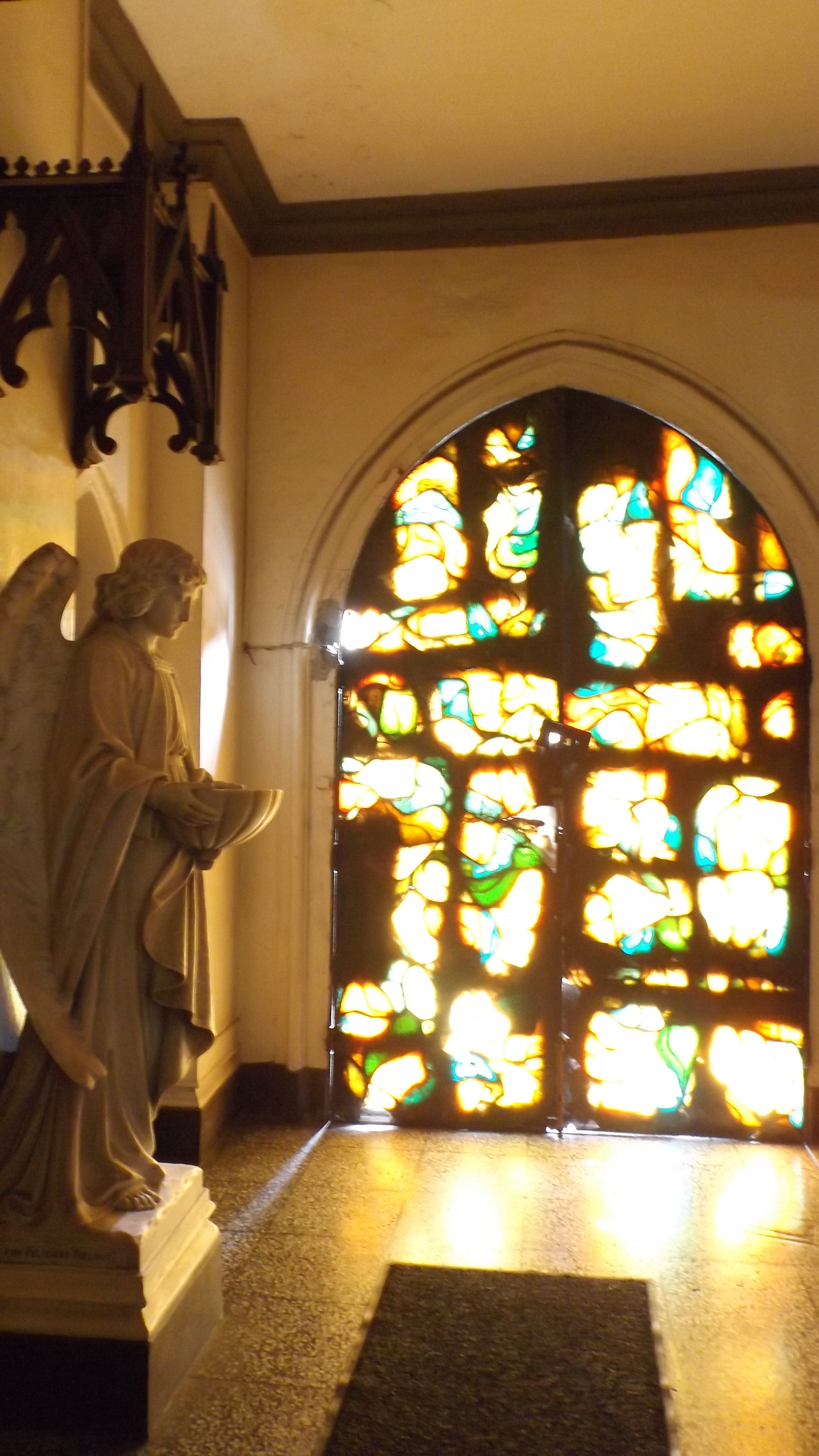
Stained glass door

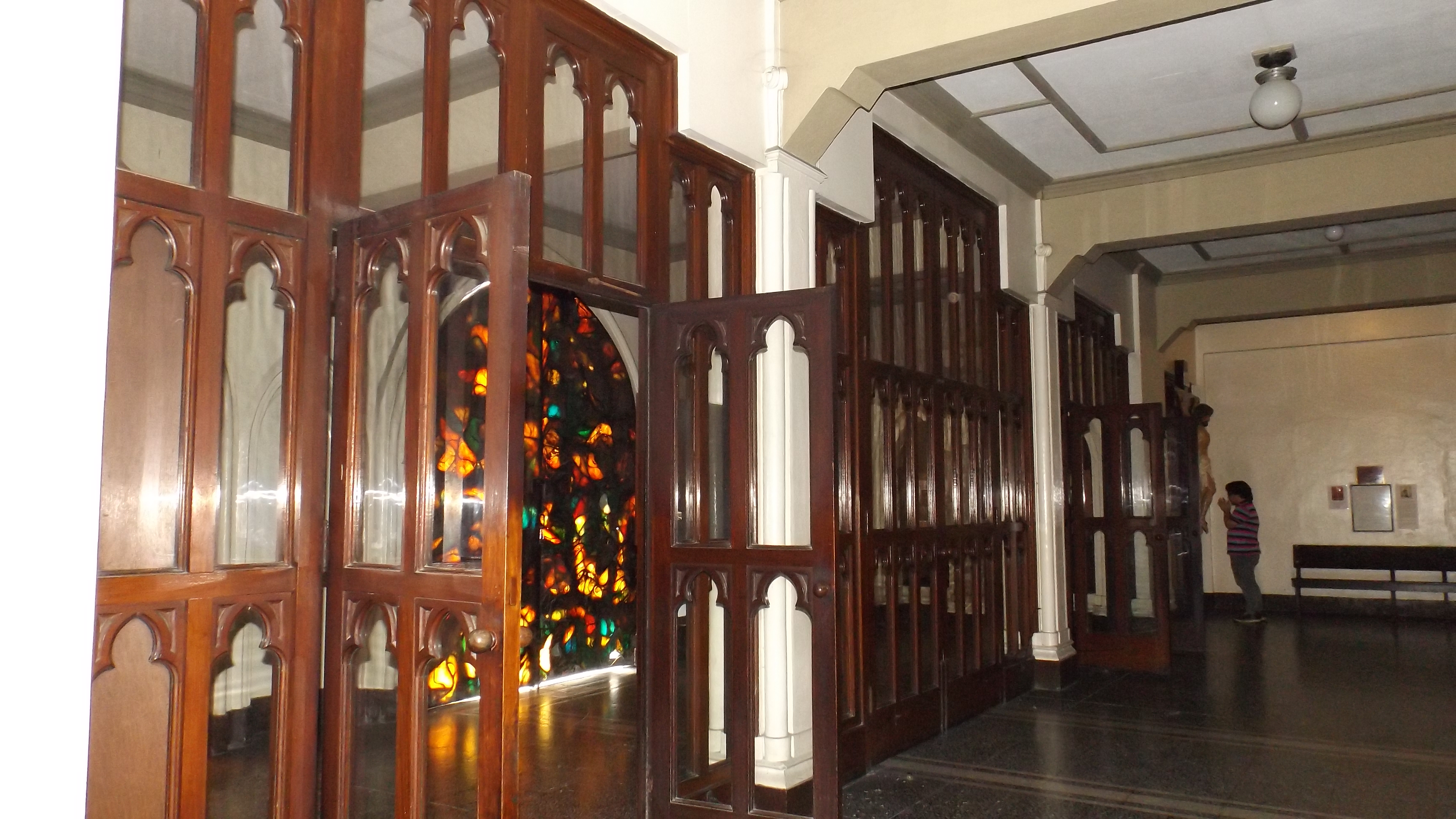
Glass doors at the narthex

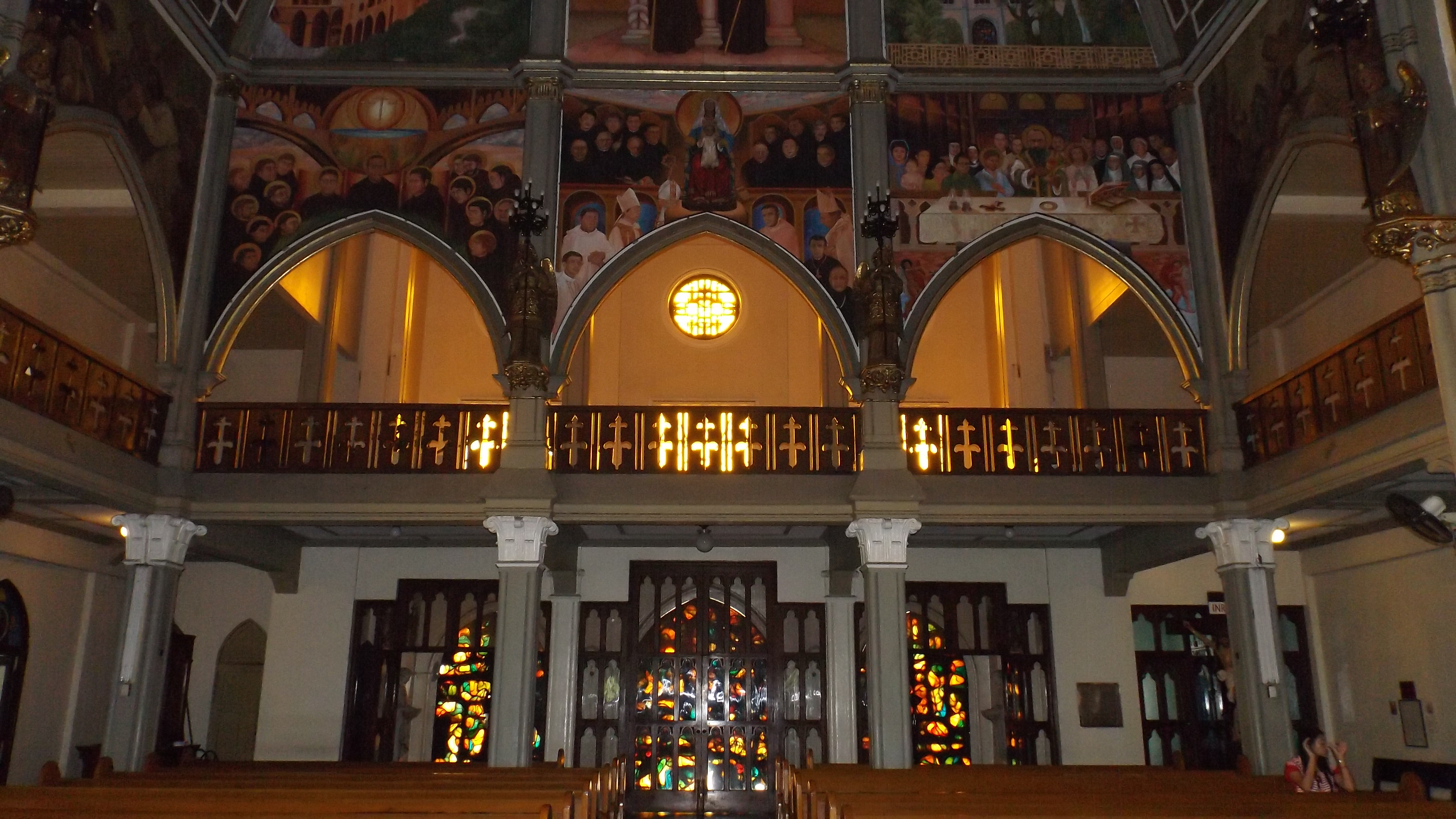
The choir loft and supporting Gothic arches

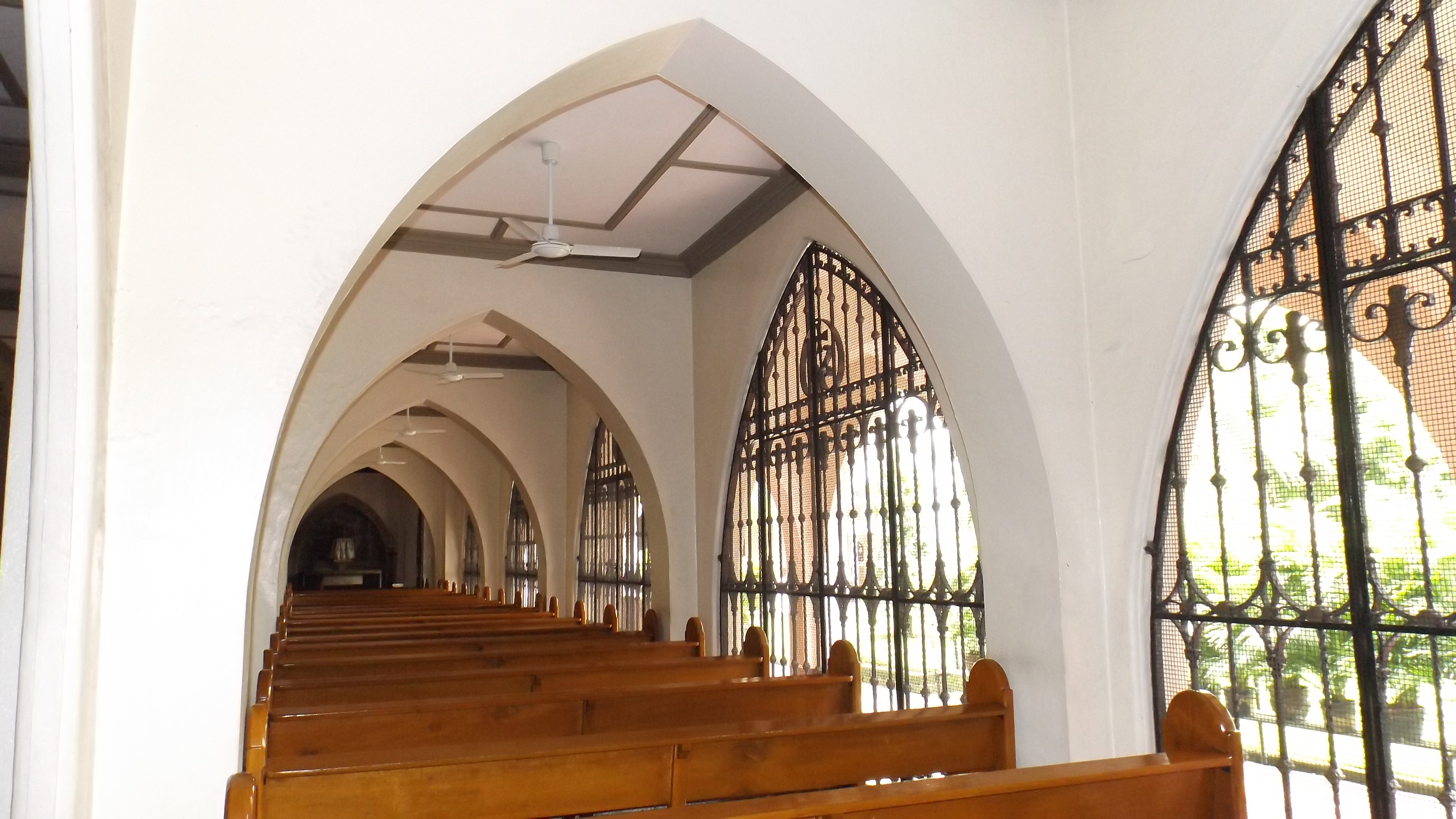
Gospel nave

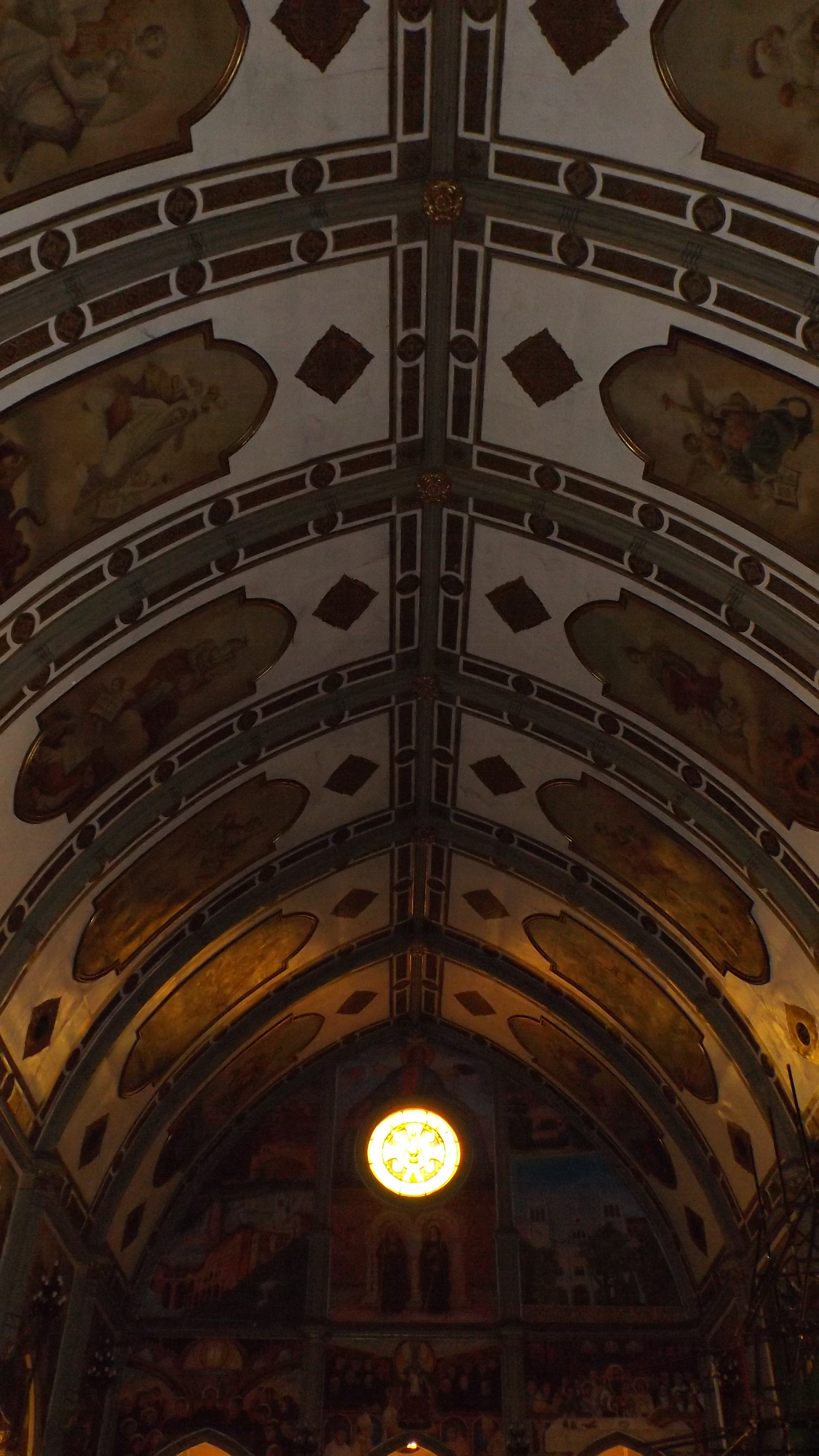
Paintings at the ceiling

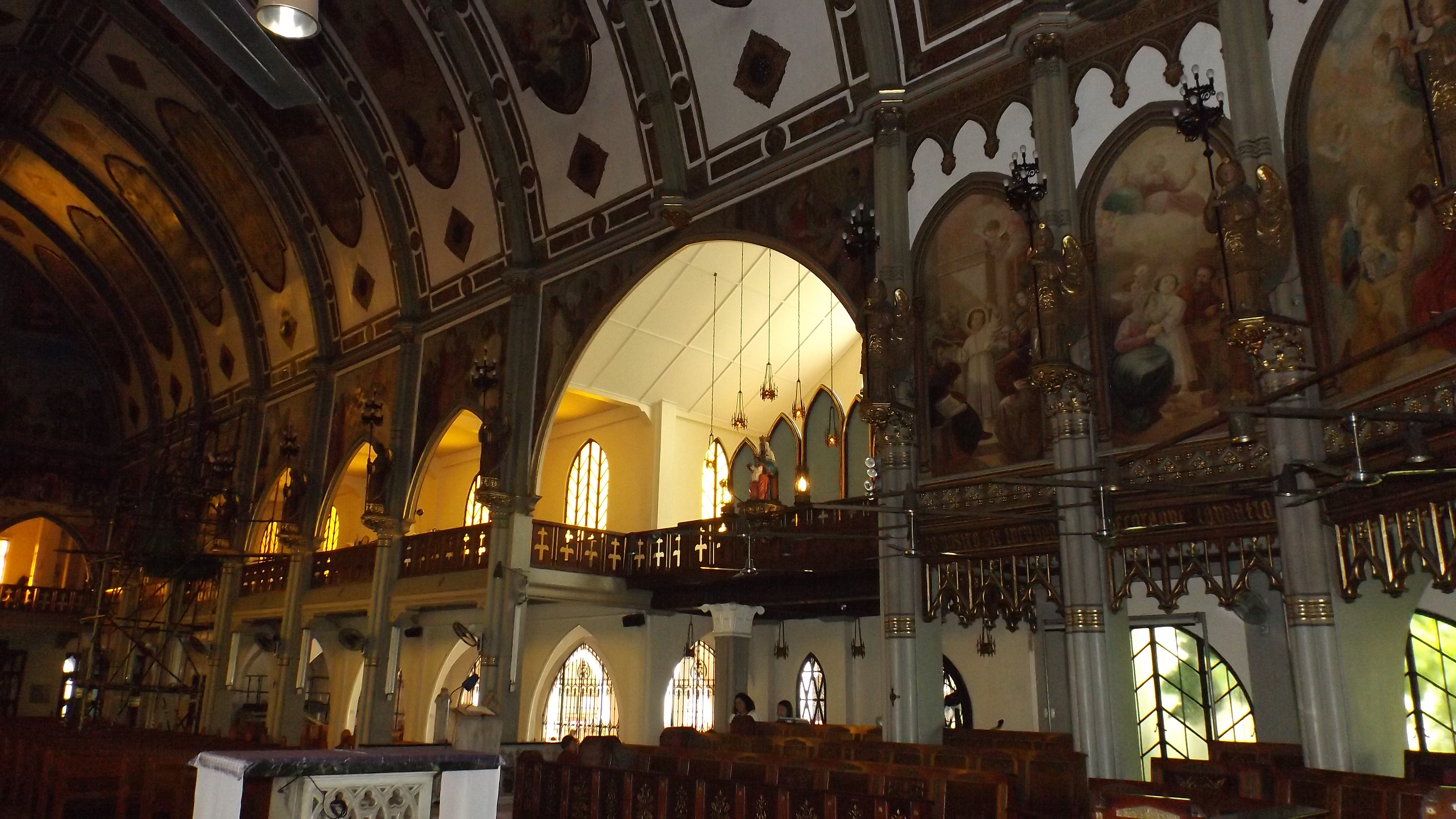
Design of the interior, right side

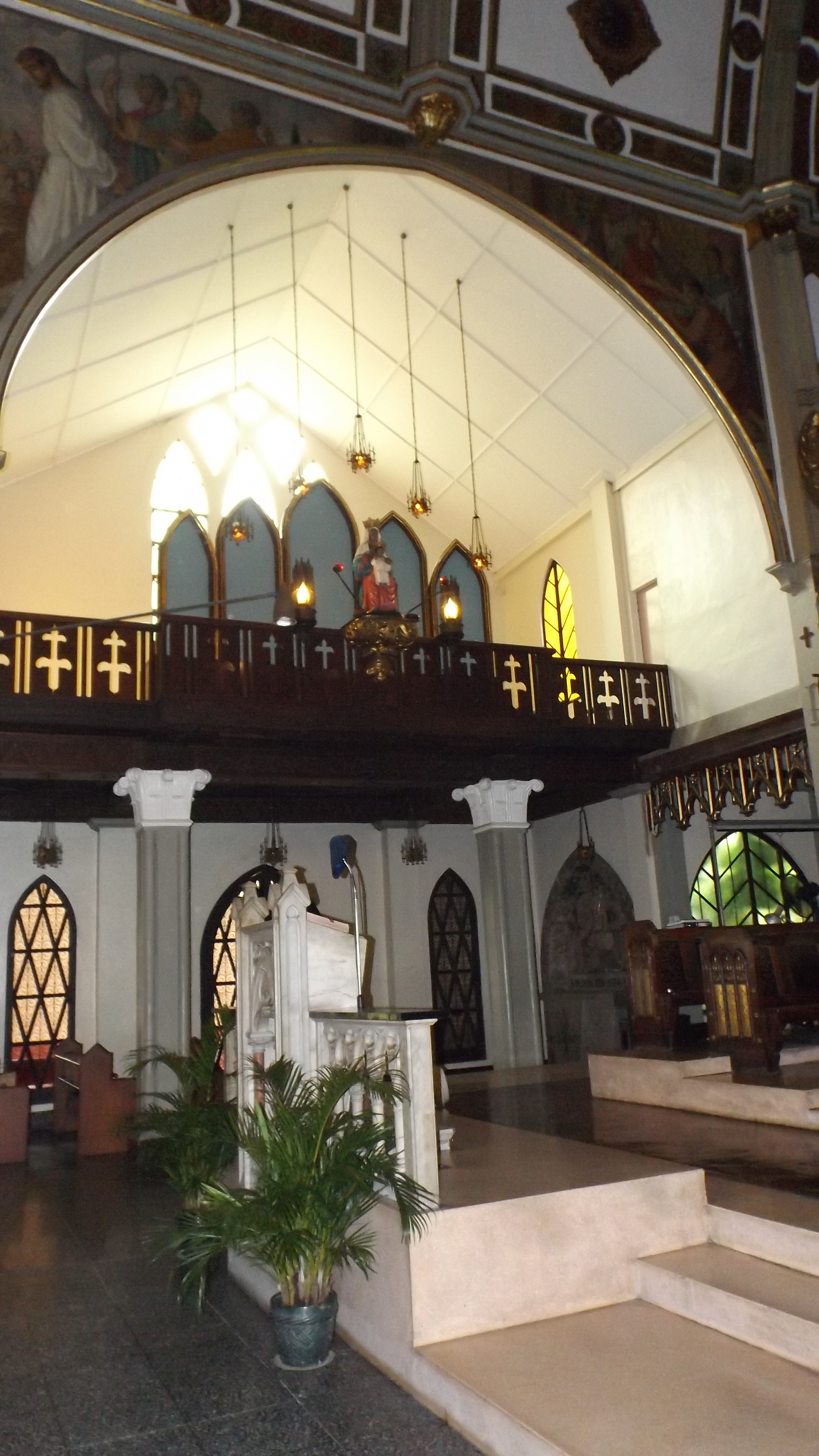
Left transept

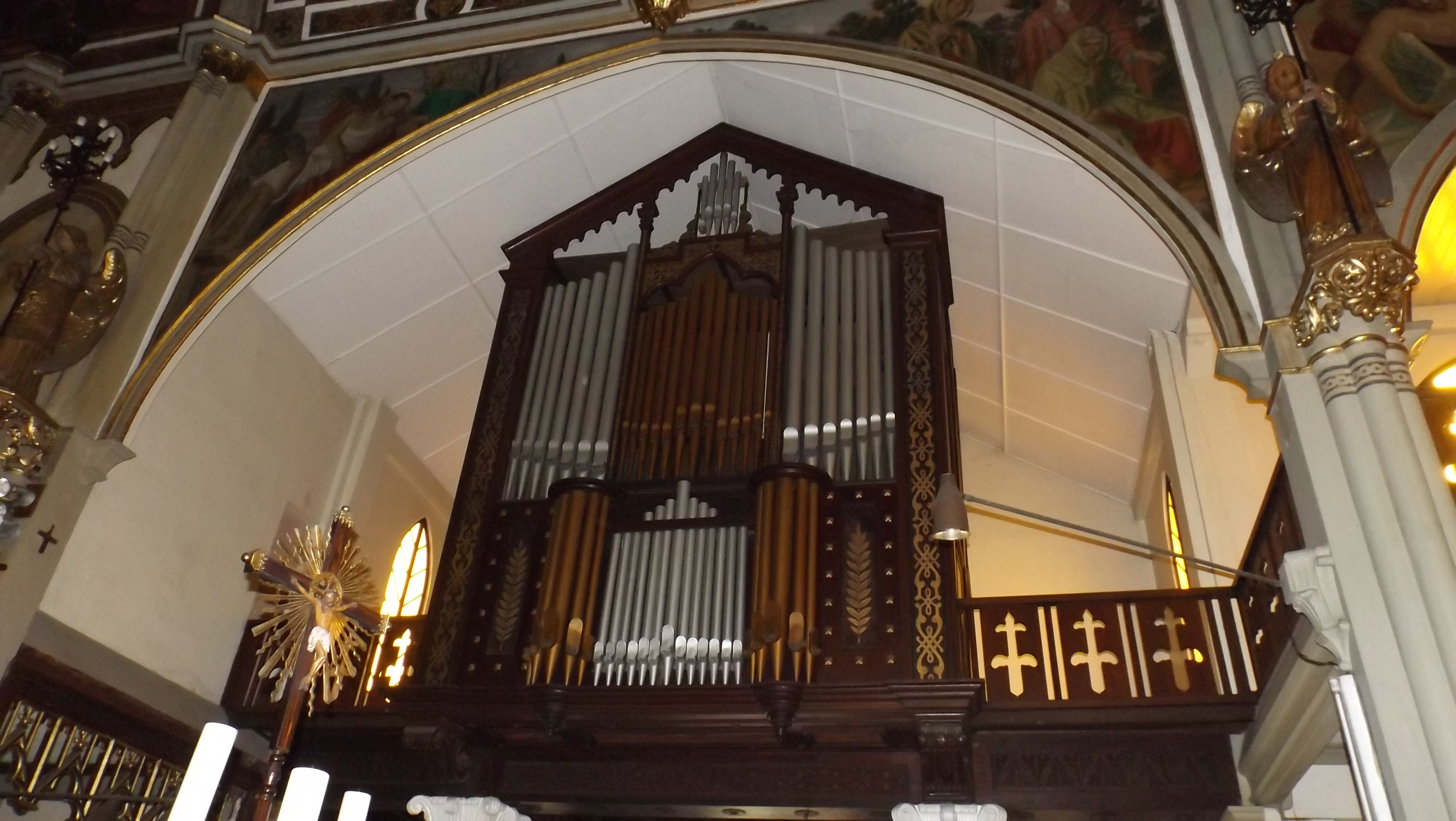
Organ in the right transept

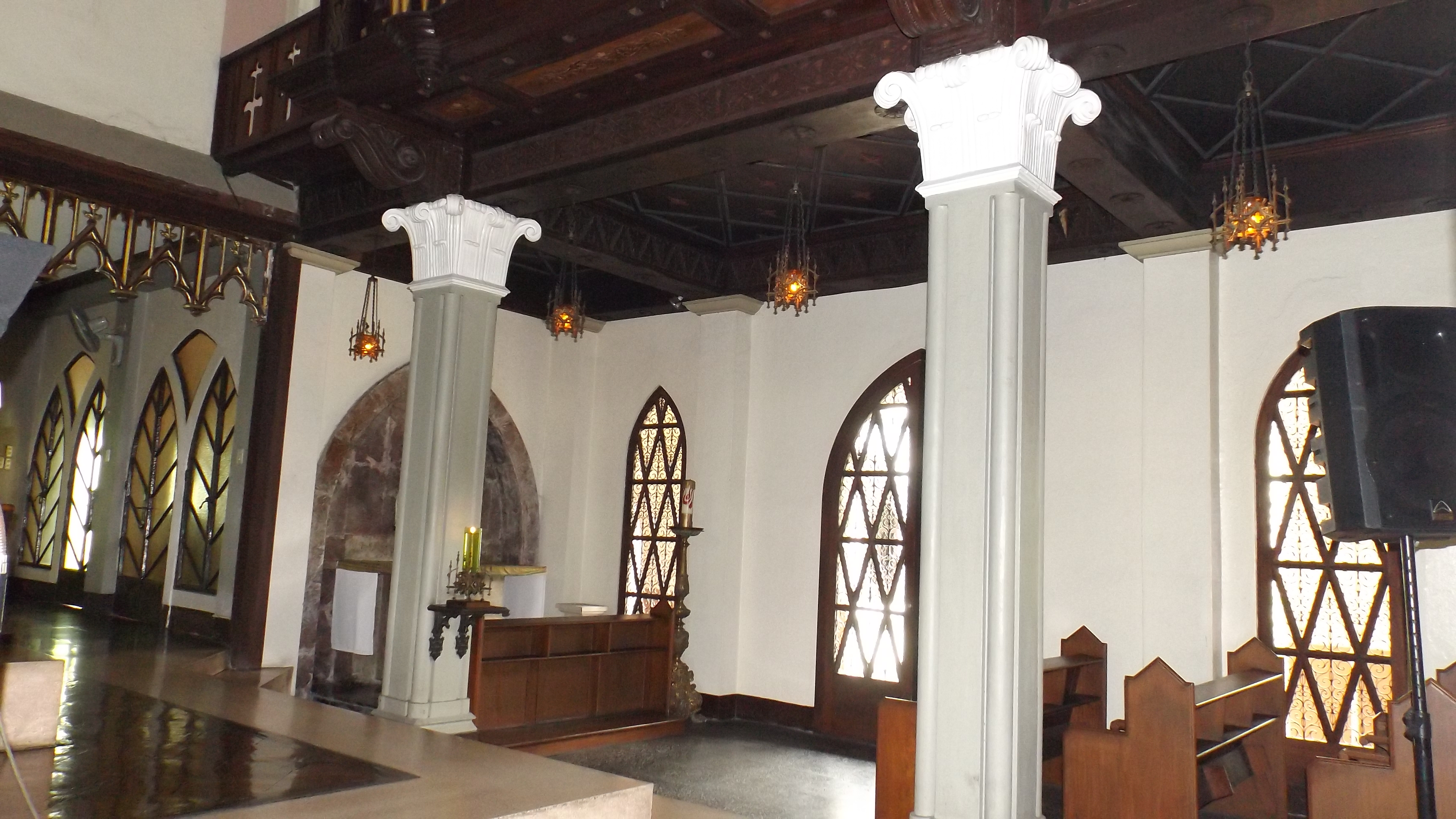
Details of the posts

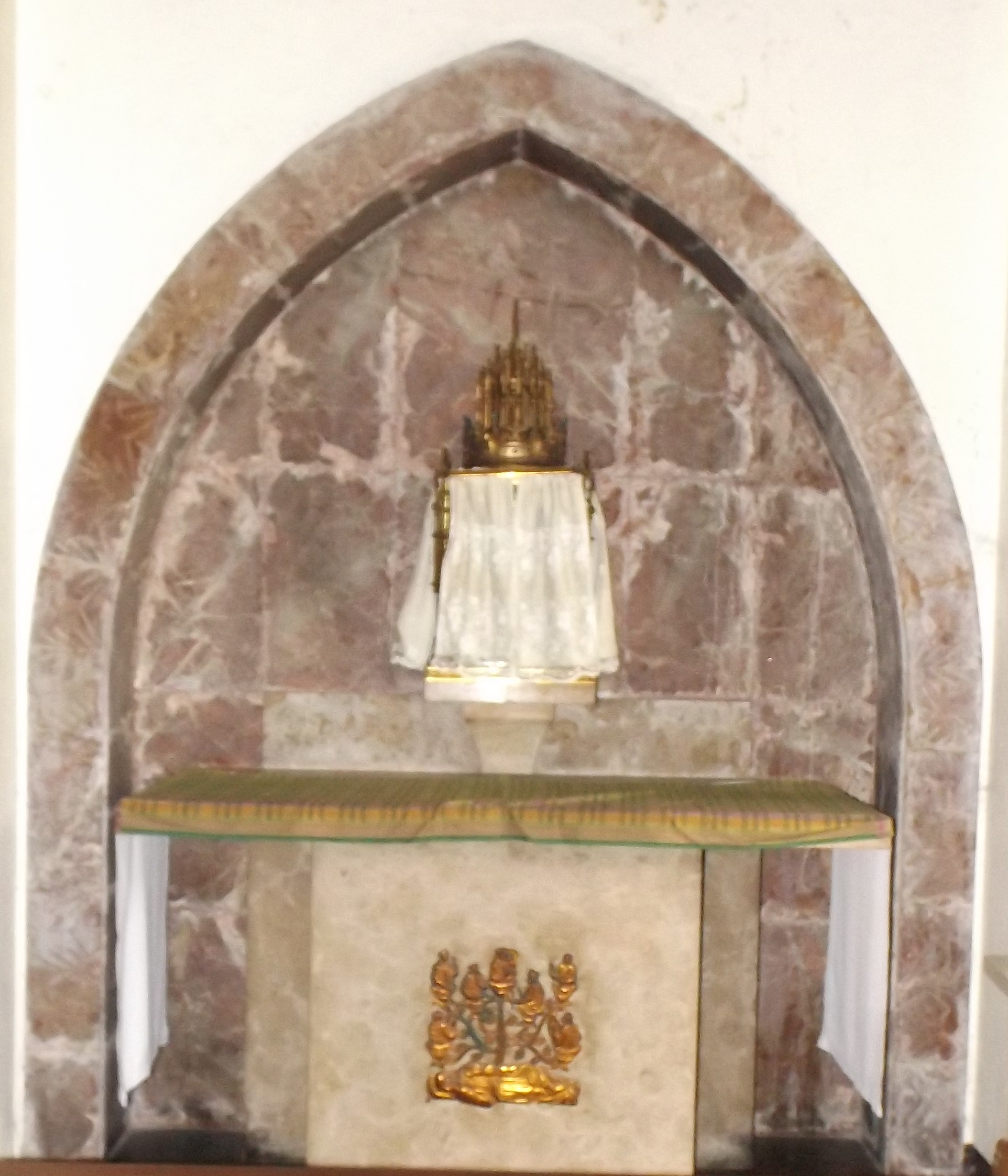
Altar at the transept chapel

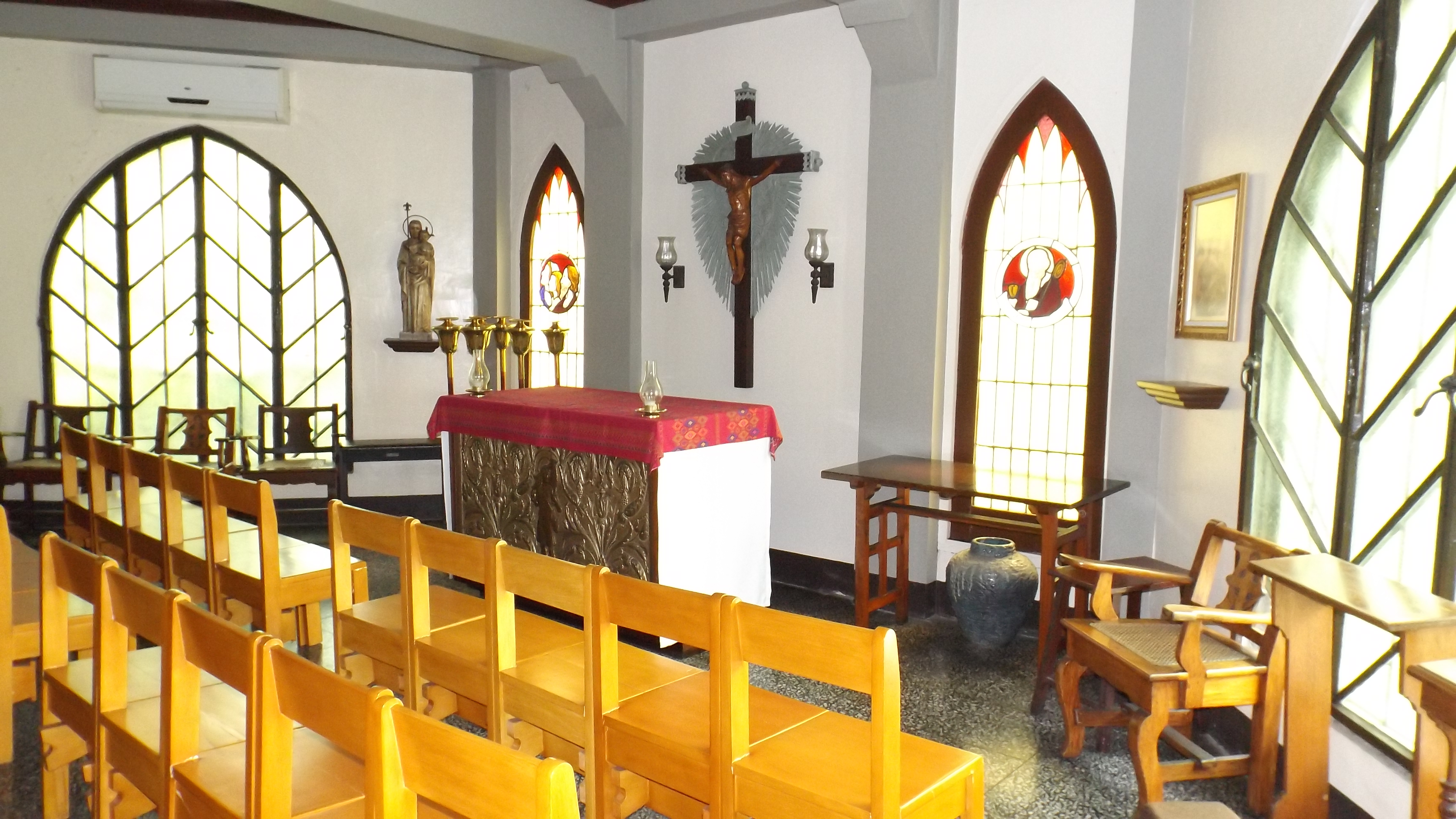
Chapel

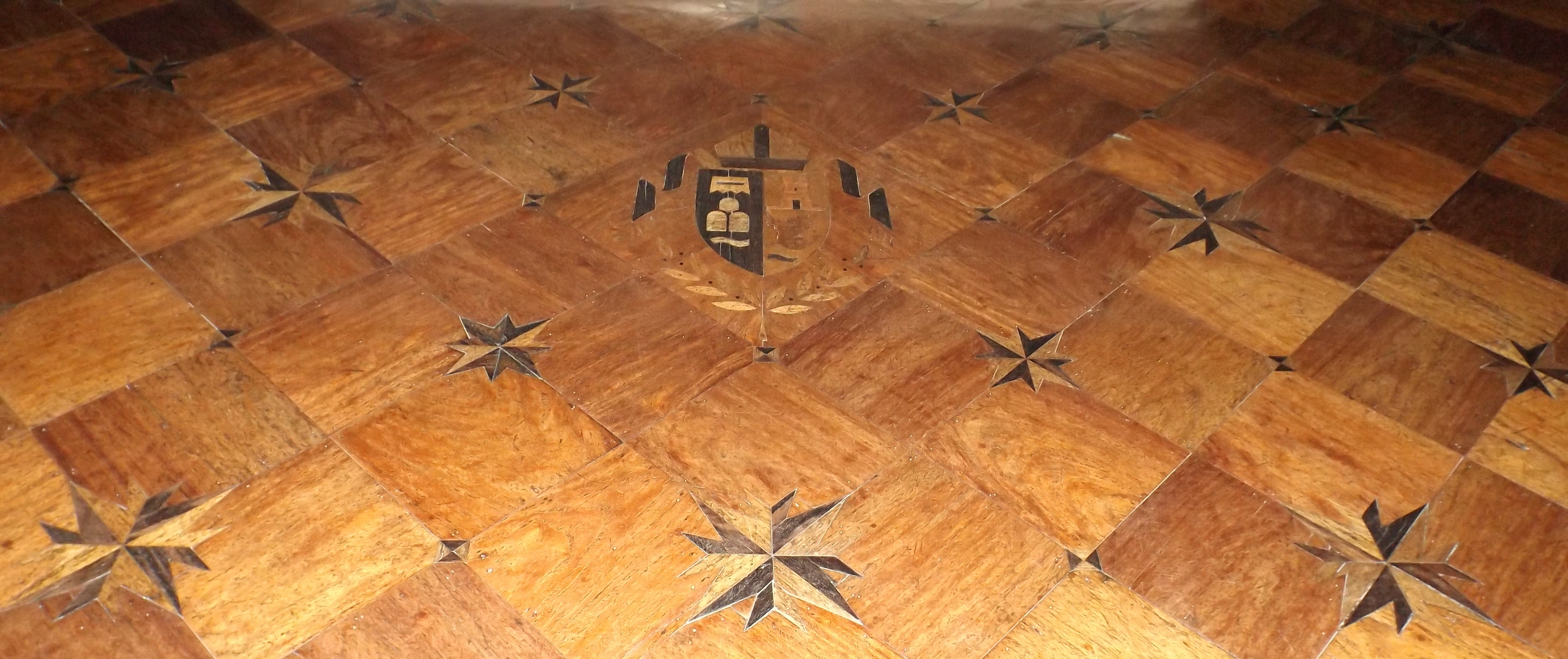
Flooring of the chancel

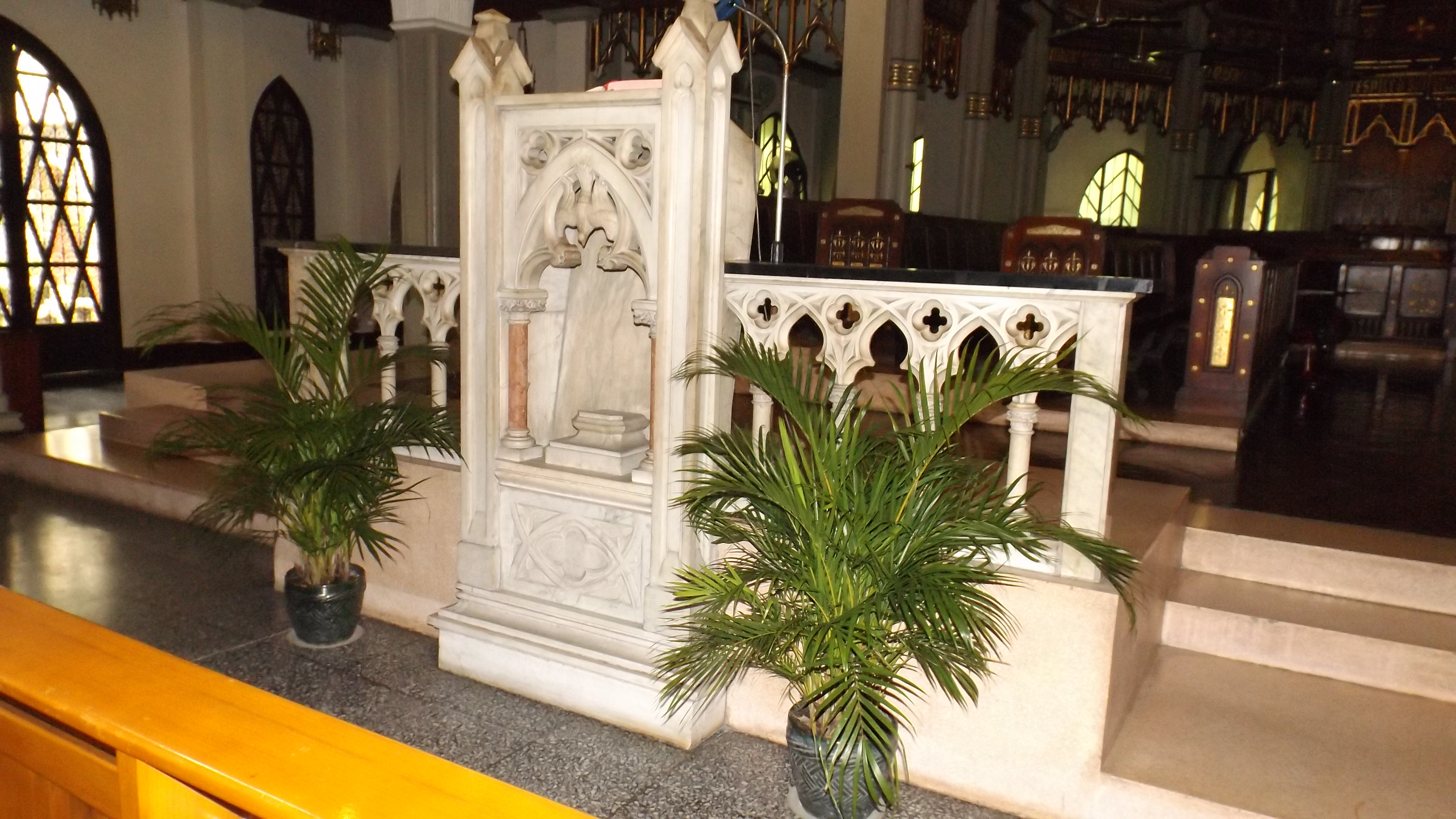
Details of the pulpit

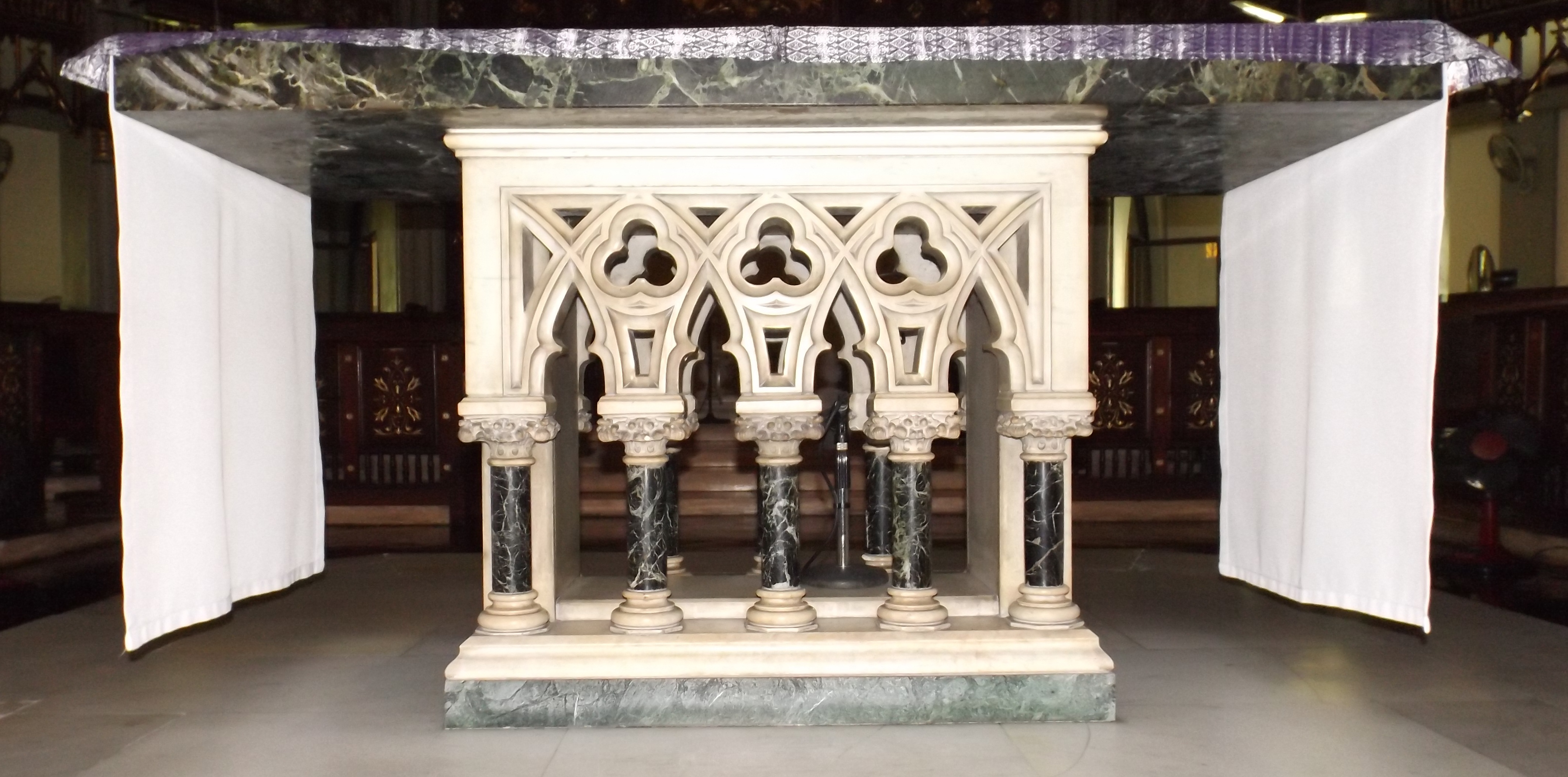
Main freestanding altar

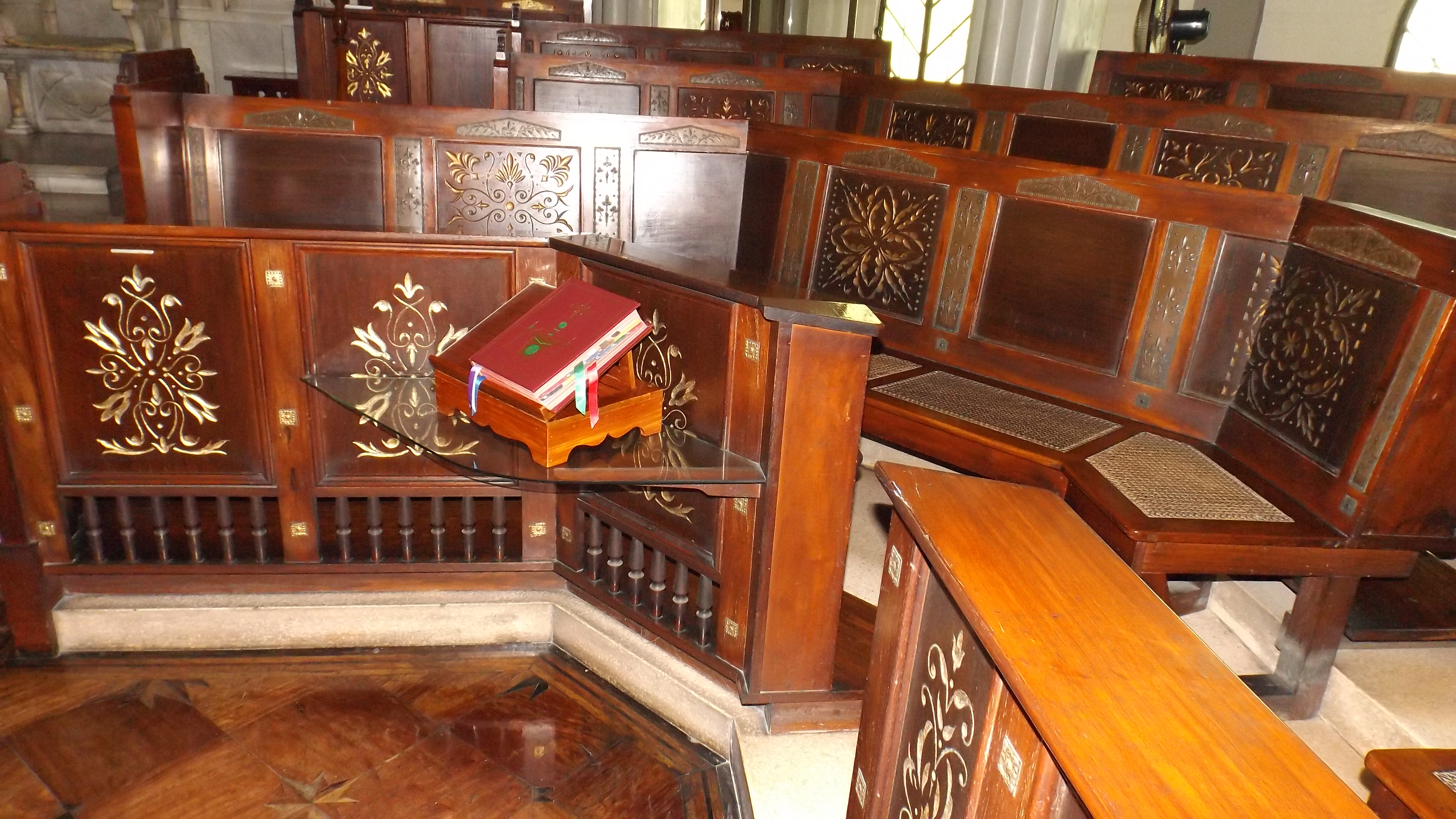
Choir stalls at the chancel

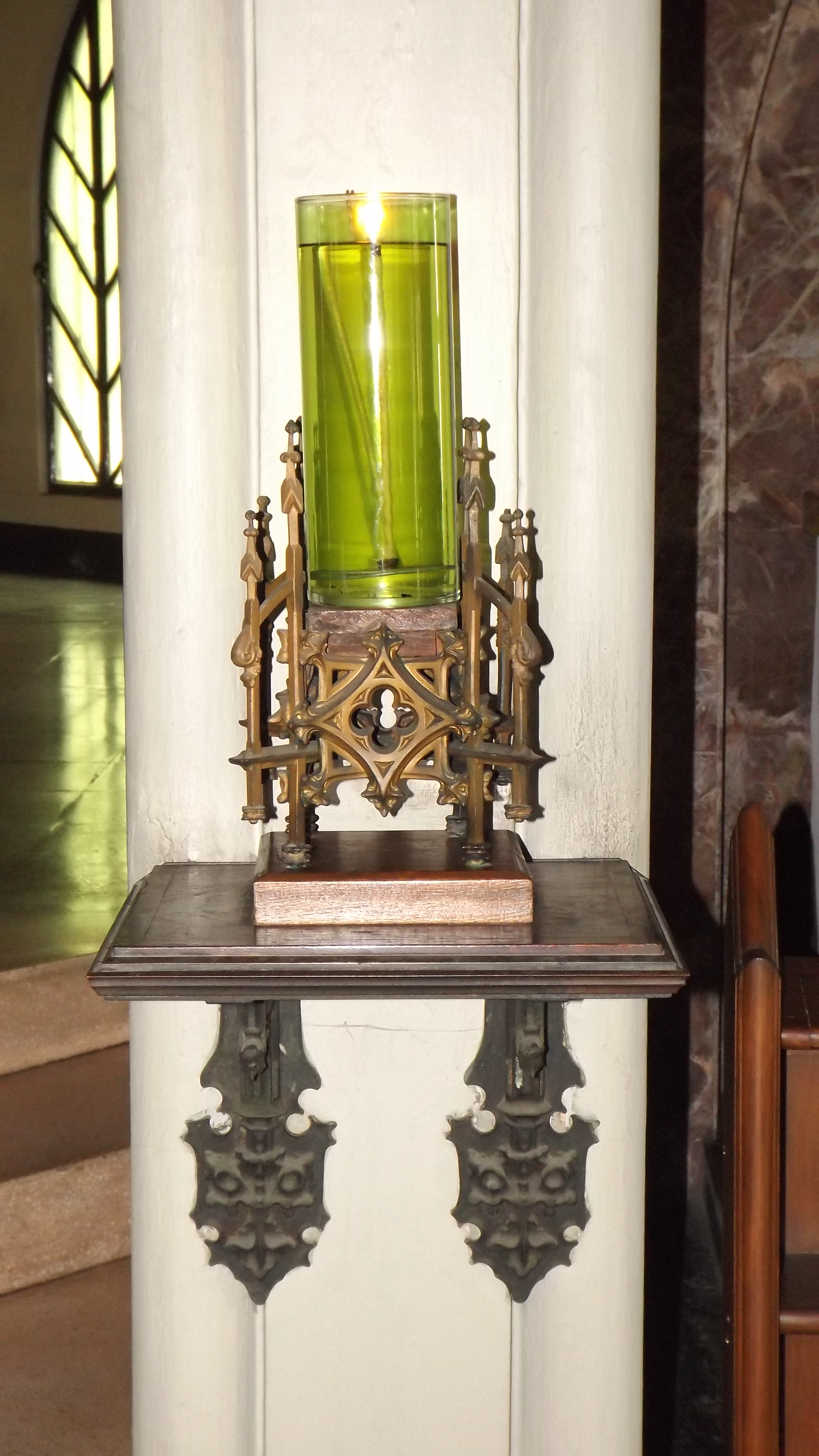
Candle holder

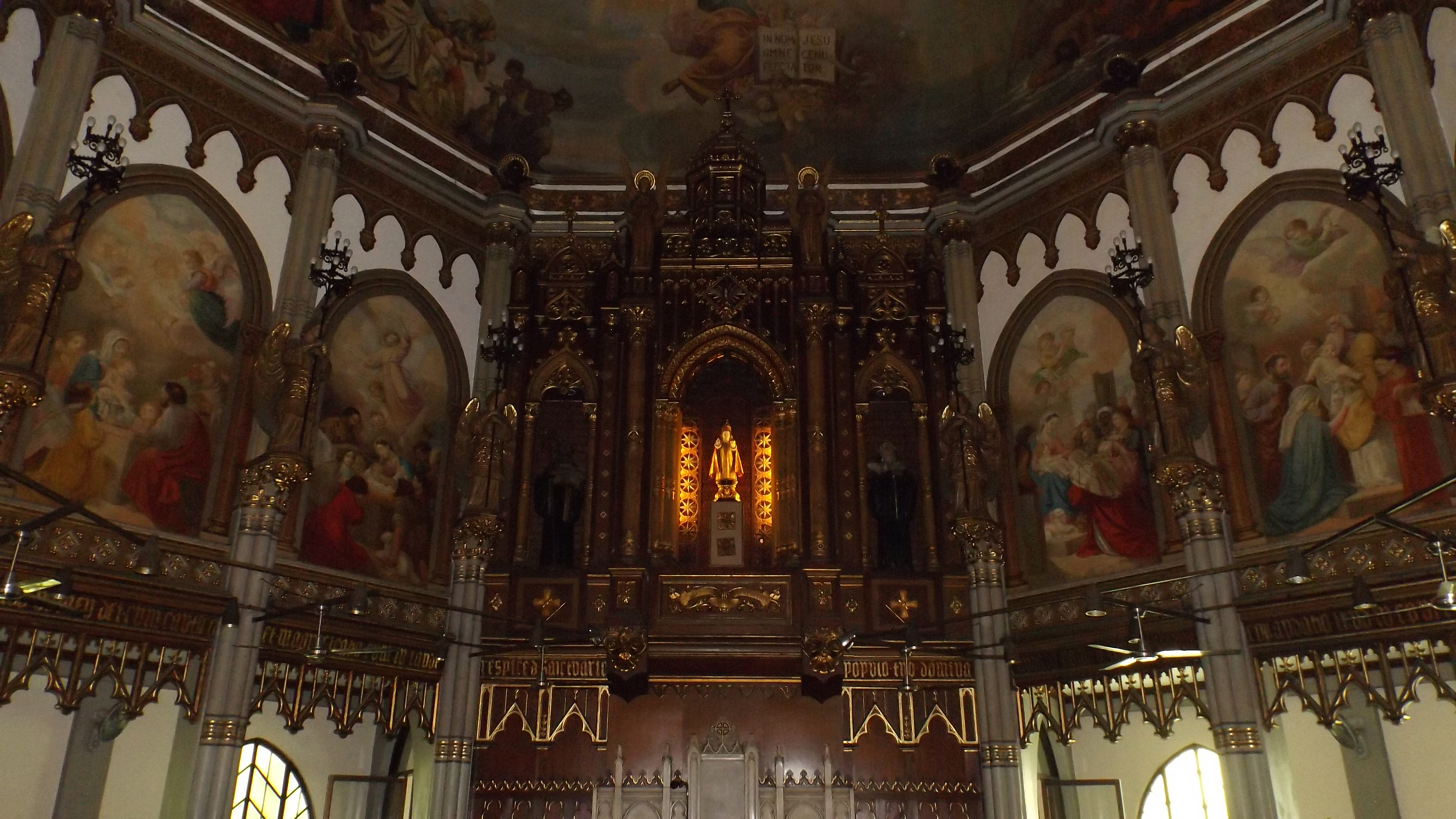
Statue of the Holy Infant of Prague enshrined in the cedar wood retablo

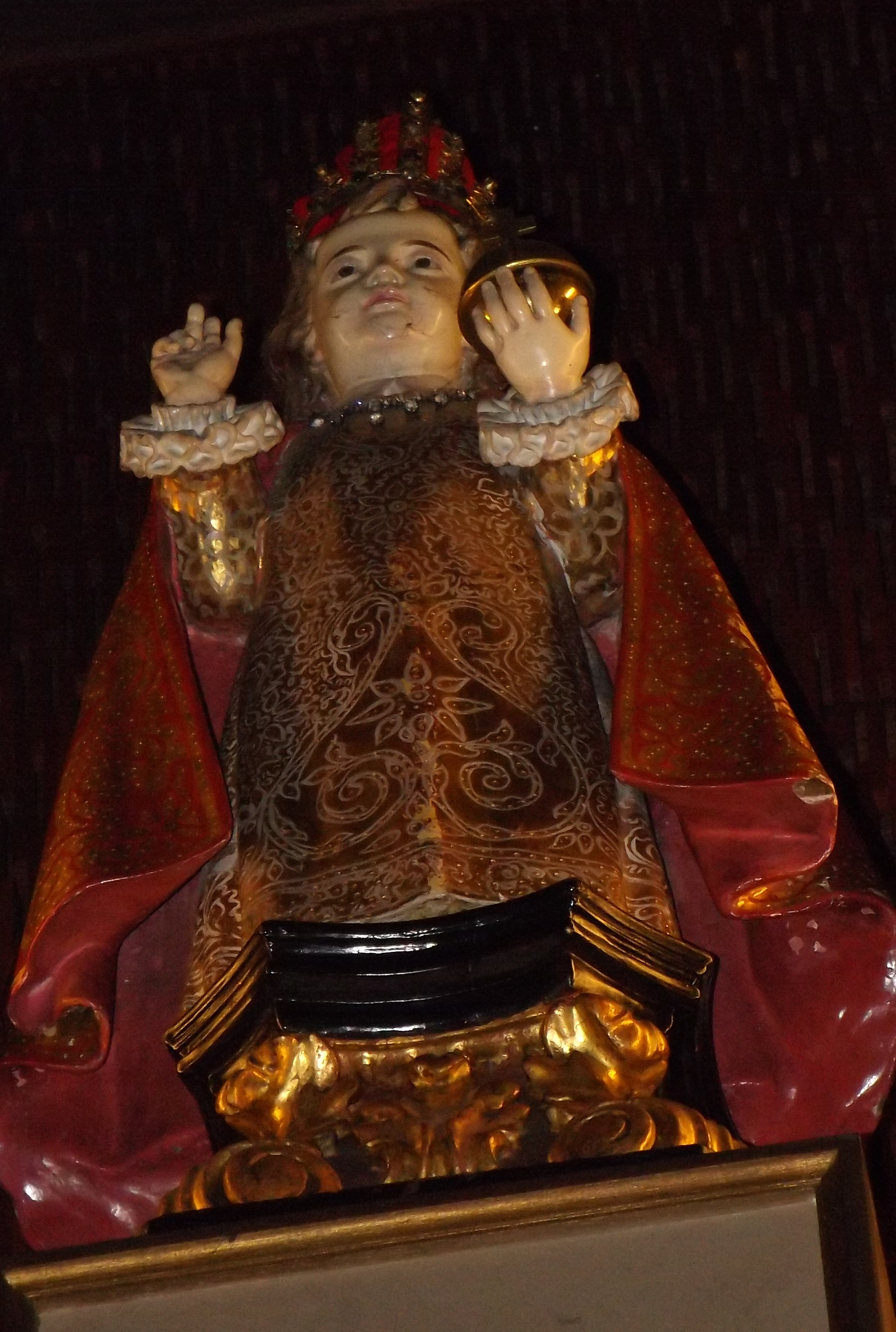
Close-up of the Holy Infant of Prague

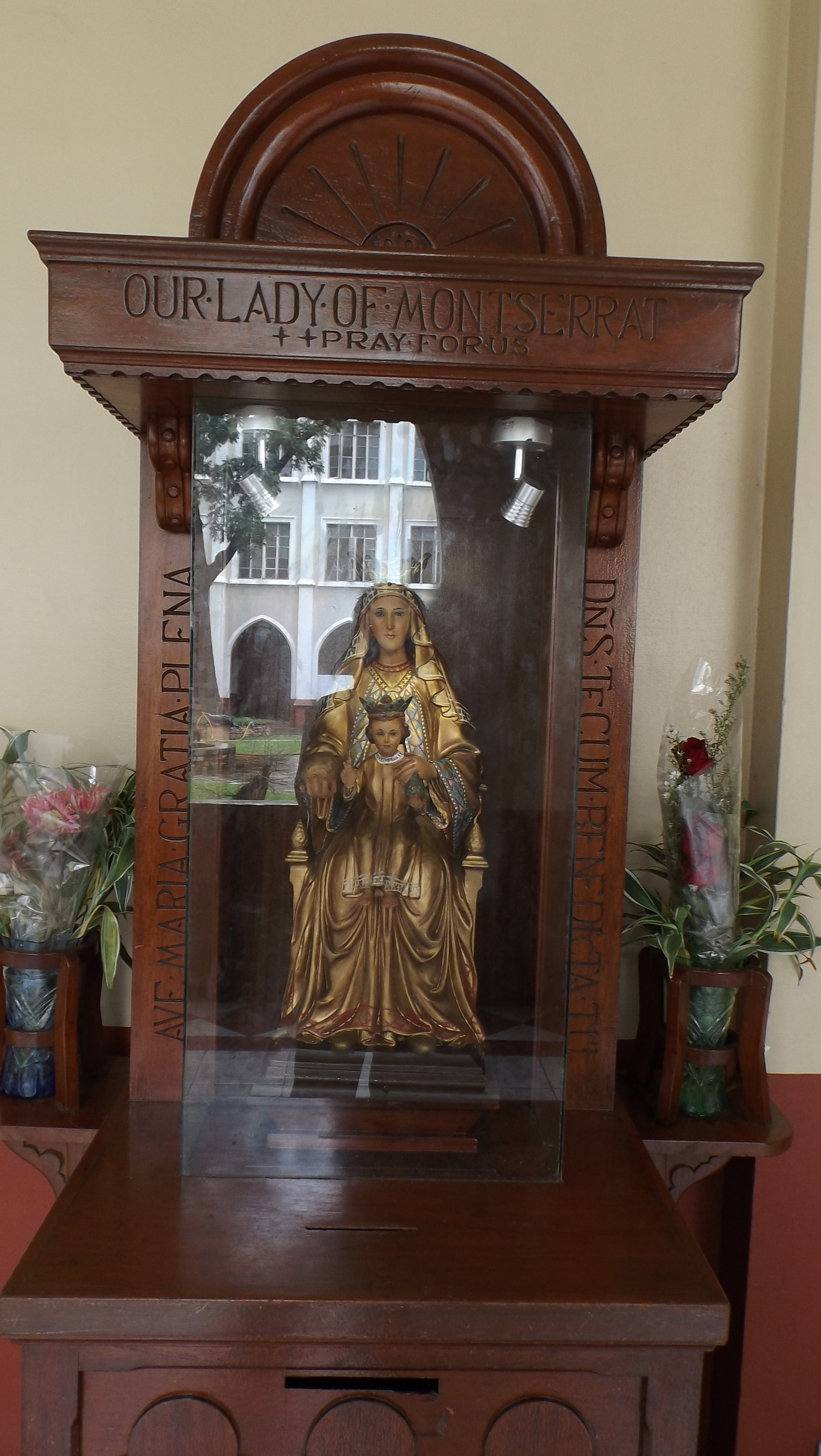
Statue of Our Lady of Montserrat statue

== See also ==
- San Beda University
