= Toumliline =

- Rural commune and town
- Interactive map of Toumliline
- Country: Morocco
- Region: Souss-Massa-Drâa
- Province: Taroudant Province

Population (2004)
  - Total: 3,000
- Time zone: UTC+0 (GMT)

Toumliline (in Standard Moroccan Amazigh, ⵜⵓⵎⵍⵉⵍⵉⵏ) is a small town and rural commune in Taroudant Province of the Souss-Massa-Drâa region of Morocco. At the time of the 2004 census, the commune had a total population of 3000 people living in 665 households.

== Toumliline monastery ==
In the vicinity of the town lies the former monastery of Toumliline which hosted the famous "International Meetings", interfaith dialogues, between 1956 and 1964. The monastery was the filming location for the acclaimed movie "Of Gods and Men".
