= Monastère Bénédictin Sainte-Marie =

Bedectidine monastery established in 1960

Monastery information
- Other name: Bouaké Priory
- Order: Subiaco Congregation, Order of Saint Benedict
- Established: 1960
- Dedication: St Mary
- Diocese: Roman Catholic Archdiocese of Bouaké

People
- Founder: Monastery of Toumliline
- Prior: Jean Décoville

Site
- Location: Bouaké, Vallée du Bandama, Côte d'Ivoire

Monastère Bénédictin Sainte-Marie, Bouaké, Côte d'Ivoire, is a Benedictine monastery of the Subiaco Congregation. Established in 1960, by the year 2000 the monastery was home to eight monks. The community is under the leadership of Prior Administrator Fr Jean Décoville.

== History ==
On December 7, 1959, three monks from the Benedictine monastery of Toumliline, Morocco, arrived in Côte d'Ivoire. By April 12 of the following year, Monastère Bénédictin Sainte-Marie had been canonically established. The monastery was raised to the status of a simple priory on February 7, 1975.

The monks of Bouaké have supported themselves by raising chickens and producing yoghurt. The monastery maintains high visibility in Bouaké by providing facilities for retreatants.

== Personnel ==
As of 2000, the community at Bouaké included eight monks, three of whom were ordained priests. The monks of Monastère Bénédictin Sainte-Marie are under the leadership of Prior Administrator Fr Jean Décoville.

== See also ==
- Order of Saint Benedict
- Subiaco Congregation
- Roman Catholicism in Côte d'Ivoire
