= List of Cistercian monasteries =

The spread of the Cistercians from their original sites during the Middle Ages

The Cistercians are a Catholic religious order of enclosed monks and nuns formed in 1098, originating from Cîteaux Abbey. Their monasteries spread throughout Europe during the Middle Ages, but many were closed during the Protestant Reformation, the Dissolution of the Monasteries under King Henry VIII, the French Revolution, and the revolutions of the 18th century. Some survived and new monasteries have been founded since the 19th century.

There are a certain number of medieval monasteries and other Cistercian buildings (salt factories, watermills) that are abandoned or ruined, or converted into hotels such as Monasterio de Piedra or St. Bernard de Clairvaux Church.

Cistercian monasteries are divided into those that follow the Common Observance and the Strict Observance (Trappists). There are currently nearly 169 Trappist monasteries in the world, the home of approximately 2500 Trappist monks and 1800 Trappist nuns.

== Europe ==
=== France ===
| Abbey | Type | Founded | Location | Closed | Re-established | Details |
|---|---|---|---|---|---|---|
| Cîteaux Abbey | Trappist | 1098 | Saint-Nicolas-lès-Cîteaux, Côte-d'Or | 1791 | 1898 | Latin Cistercium, from which the Order's name derives. |
| Pontigny Abbey | | 1114 | | | 1843 | Second of the four great daughter houses of Cîteaux; refounded by the Fathers of St. Edmund |
| Clairvaux Abbey | | 1115 | | | | Third of the four great daughter houses of Cîteaux; founded by St Bernard |
| Morimond Abbey | | 1115 | | 1791 | | Fourth of the four great daughter houses of Cîteaux |
| Mazan Abbey | | 1120 | | | | |
| Abbey of Loc-Dieu | | 1123 | | 1793 | | |
| Le Thoronet Abbey | | ca. 1150s | Brignoles | 1785 | | |
| Silvacane Abbey | | 1144 | La Roque d'Antheron | 1443 | | |
| Abbey of Sénanque | | 1148 | Gordes | | | |
| Our Lady of the Snows | Trappist | 1850 | Saint-Laurent-les-Bains, Ardèche | | | |
| Lérins Abbey | | 1869 | Île Saint-Honorat | | | Founded on the site of a monastery established by Saint Honoratus ca. 410. |
| Bonneval Abbey | Trappist nuns | 1147 | Le Cayrol, Aveyron | 1791 | 1875 | Bonneval means Good Valley. |

=== Belgium ===
| Abbey | Type | Founded | Location | Closed | Re-established | Details |
|---|---|---|---|---|---|---|
| Aulne Abbey | | 637 - 1147 | Thuin | 1794 | | Important ruins |
| La Cambre Abbey | | 1196 | Ixelles | | | |
| Hemiksem Abbey | | 1243 | Hemiksem | ca. 1795 | 1836 in Bornem | |
| Herkenrode Abbey | Nuns | 1182 | Kuringen | 1797 | | |
| Orval Abbey | Trappist | 1132 | Gaume | 1793 | 1935 | The Orval Brewery produces two well known Trappist beers |
| Ten Duinen Abbey | | 1107–1138 | Koksijde and Bruges | 1796 | | The Abbey was moved from Koksijde to Bruges in the 17th century |
| Villers Abbey | | 1146 | Villers-la-Ville | 1796 | | Impressive ruins |
| Westmalle Abbey | Trappist | 1794–1836 | Westmalle | | | |
| Bornem Abbey | | | Bornem | | | successor of Hemiksem Abbey |

=== Central and Eastern Europe ===
| Abbey | Type | Founded | Location | Closed | Re-established | Details |
|---|---|---|---|---|---|---|
| Stična Abbey | Common Observance | 1132 | Stična, Slovenia | 1784 | 1898 | http://www.sticna.eu |
| Jędrzejów Abbey | Common Observance | 1140 | Jędrzejów, Poland | 1819 | 1945 | |
| Wągrowiec (formerly Łekno) Abbey | Common Observance | 1153 | Wągrowiec, Poland | 1835 | | |
| Sulejów Abbey | Common Observance | 1176 | Sulejów, Poland | 1819 | 1986 | http://www.sulejow.cystersi.pl |
| Wąchock Abbey | Common Observance | 1179 | Wąchock, Poland | 1818 | 1951 | http://www.wachock.cystersi.pl |
| Mogiła Abbey | Common Observance | 1222 | Kraków, Poland | | | http://www.mogila.cystersi.pl |
| Szczyrzyc Abbey | Common Observance | 1224 | Szczyrzyc, Poland | | | http://www.szczyrzyc.cystersi.pl |
| Zirc Abbey | | 1182 | Hungary | ca. 1540 | 1701 | http://www.ocist.hu |
| Igriș Abbey | - | 1179 | Romania | 1551 | - | |
| Cârța Monastery | - | 1205-6 | Romania | 1474 | - | |
| Kołbacz | - | 1210 | Poland | 1347 | - | |
| Kutjevo | | 1232 | Croatia | | | |
| Bélakút Abbey | - | 1235 | Vojvodina, Serbia | 1688 | - | |
| Krzeszów Abbey | | 1242 | Poland | | | |

=== Scandinavia ===
| Abbey | Type | Founded | Location | Closed | Re-established | Details |
|---|---|---|---|---|---|---|
| Alvastra Abbey | | 1143 | Östergötland, Sweden | 1544 | | Ordered torn down by Gustavus I in 1544 |
| Nydala Abbey | | 1143 | Småland, Sweden | 1529 | 2008 | Three Vietnamese monks arrived on 6 June 2008 |
| Lyse Abbey | | 1146 | Norway | 1537 | | |
| Hovedøya Abbey | | 1147 | Oslo, Norway | 1532 | | Burned prior to the Reformation |
| Varnhem Abbey | | 1150 | Västergötland, Sweden | 1566 | | |
| Julita Abbey | | 1160 | Södermanland, Sweden | 1527 | | |
| Esrum Abbey | | 1151 by Archbishop Eskild & Bernard of Clairvaux | Zealand, Denmark (Sjælland) | After The Reformation 1536 | | |
| Sorø Klosterkirke | | 1161 by Bishop Absalon | Zealand, Denmark (Sjælland) | ca. 1580 | | Founded by monks from Esrum Abbey |
| Vitskøl Abbey | | 1158 by Archbishop Eskild | Jutland, Denmark | After The Reformation 1536 | | Founded by monks from Esrum & Varnhem, Sweden |
| Løgum Abbey | | 1173 by Bishop Stefan (Finished in 1325) | Jutland, Denmark | 1548 | | Burned in 1190 and therefore finished 1325 |
| Roma Abbey | | 1164 | Gotland, Sweden | Before 1531 | | Founded by monks from Nydala Abbey |
| Tautra Abbey | Trappist | 1207 | Norway | 1537 | 1999 | |
| Stamsund | Common Observance | | Lofoten Islands, Norway | | | Recently established |

=== Germany ===
| Abbey | Type | Founded | Location | Closed | Re-established | Details |
|---|---|---|---|---|---|---|
| Himmerod Abbey | Monks | 1134 by Bernard of Clairvaux | Grosslittgen | 2017 | | https://www.abteihimmerod.de/ |
| Lehnin Abbey | | 1180 | Lehnin | 1542 | | http://www.klosterkirche-lehnin.de/ |
| Marienstatt Abbey | | 1212 | Streithausen near Hachenburg | | | https://www.abtei-marienstatt.de/ |
| Bebenhausen Abbey | Monks | 1187 | Bebenhausen | 1535 | | https://www.kloster-bebenhausen.de/en/home |
| Bottenbroich Abbey | Nuns | 1234 | Kerpen | 1802 | 1448 as monks priory. 1802 parish church. 1951 demolished | |
| Heiligkreuztal Monastery | Monks | 1227 | Heiligkreuztal | 1803 | | https://www.klosterheiligkreuztal.de/start |
| Lichtenthal Abbey | Nuns | 1248 | Baden-Baden | | | http://www.abtei-lichtenthal.de/ |
| Priory Mariawald | Monks | 1486 | Heimbach | 1795 | 1861, Trappists, 2018 finally closed | https://kloster-mariawald.de/ |
| Maulbronn Monastery | Monks | 1147 | Maulbronn, Baden-Württemberg | 1648 | | https://www.kloster-maulbronn.de/start |
| Porta Coeli | Nuns | 1630; 1647 | Himmelpforten | 1634 | | |
| Salem Abbey | Monks | 1136 | Salem, Baden-Württemberg (near Lake Constance) | 1802 | | |
| Waldsassen Abbey | Nuns | 1133 | Waldsassen, Bavaria (near Czech border) | | 1863 | http://www.abtei-waldsassen.de/ |
| Zinna Abbey | | 1170 | Jüterbog | 1553 | | http://www.kloster-zinna.com/index.php |

=== Austria ===
| Abbey | Type | Founded | Location | Closed | Re-established | Details |
|---|---|---|---|---|---|---|
| Heiligenkreuz Abbey | Common Observance | 1133 | Heiligenkreuz, Lower Austria | | | http://www.stift-heiligenkreuz.org/ |
| Lilienfeld Abbey | Common Observance | 1202 | Lilienfeld, Lower Austria | | | http://www.stift-lilienfeld.at/ |
| Rein Abbey | Common Observance | 1129 | Near Gratwein, Austria | | | http://www.stift-rein.at/ |
| Stift Stams | Common Observance | 1273 | Imst District, Austrian state of Tyrol, near Innsbruck | 1807, 1939 | 1816, 1946 | http://www.stiftstams.at/?lang=en |
| Zwettl Abbey | Common Observance | 1138 | Zwettl, Lower Austria | | | http://www.stift-zwettl.at/ |

=== Czechia ===
| Abbey | Type | Founded | Location | Closed | Re-established | Details |
|---|---|---|---|---|---|---|
| Sedlec Abbey | | 1142 | (Near) Kutná Hora, Bohemia | 1783 | | |
| Plasy abbey | | 1144 | Plasy, Bohemia | 1785 | | |
| Osek abbey | | 1199 | Osek, Bohemia | | | http://www.klaster-osek.info/ |
| Porta coeli Convent | Nuns | 1233 | Předklášteří near Tišnov, Moravia | 1782, 1950 | 1901, 1990 | http://www.portacoeli.cz/ |
| Vyšší Brod Monastery | | 1259 | Vyšší Brod, Bohemia | 1941 | 1989 | http://www.klastervyssibrod.cz/ |
| Zbraslav Monastery | | 1292 | Zbraslav, today in Prague, Bohemia | 1785 | | |
| Nový Dvůr Monastery | Trappist | 2002 | Near Toužim, Bohemia | | | http://www.novydvur.cz/ |
| Klášter Naší Paní nad Vltavou | Trappist nuns | 2007 | Křečovice, Bohemia | | | http://www.trappistevitorchiano.it/storia-fondazioni-nasi-pani-cz.asp |

=== Italy ===
| Abbey | Type | Founded | Location | Closed | Re-established | Details |
|---|---|---|---|---|---|---|
| St.Peter and Paul Abbey | | 1131 | Abbadia Cerreto, Lombardy | | | |
| Certosa di Pavia | | 1396 | Certosa di Pavia, Lombardy | | | |
| Chiaravalle Abbey | | 1135 | Milan, Lombardy | | | |
| Morimondo Abbey | | 1134 | Morimondo, Lombardy | | | |
| Piona Abbey | | | Colico, Lombardy | | | |
| Rovato Abbey | | | Rovato, Lombardy | | | |
| Viboldone Abbey | | 1176 | San Giuliano Milanese, Lombardy | | | |
| Santa Maria Arabona | | 1209 | Manoppello, Abruzzo | 1587 | | |
| Santa Maria Casanova | | 1191 | Villa Celiera, Abruzzo | 1807 | | |
| Santa Maria della Vittoria | | 1277 | Scurcola Marsicana, Abruzzo | 1550 | | |
| Santi Vito e Salvo | | 1247 | Villa Celiera, Abruzzo | 1453 | | |
| Santo Spirito d'Ocre | | 1248 | Ocre, Abruzzo | 1692 | | |
| S. Maria di Chiaravalle di Fiastra | Common Observance | 1142 | Urbisaglia | 1581 | 1985 | http://www.abbadiafiastra.net/ |
| Monastery of Calabromaria | | | Altilia di Santa Severina | 1784 | | |
| Abbazia di San Giusto, Tuscania | Common Observance | 1146 | Tuscania | 1460? | 2012 | https://web.archive.org/web/20130607043624/http://www.abbaziadisangiusto.it/ |

=== Spain and Portugal ===
| Abbey | Type | Founded | Location | Closed | Re-established | Details |
|---|---|---|---|---|---|---|
| Santa María la Real, Fitero | | 1141 | Fitero, Spain | 1835 | | |
| Santa María de la Oliva | | 1134 | Carcastillo, Spain | 1835 | 1927 | |
| Poblet Monastery | | 1151 | Catalonia, Spain | 1835 | 1940s | Listed by UNESCO as a World Heritage Site since 1991 |
| Monastery of Alcobaça | | 1153 | Portugal | | | Listed by UNESCO as a World Heritage Site since 1989 |
| Convento de Santa Maria do Bouro | | 1195 | Portugal | | | |
| Casbas Monastery | | 1196 | Casbas de Huesca, Aragon, Spain | 2004 | | Previously a Benedictine community; in 1196 it became Cistercian |
| Monasterio Santa María de Valdediós | | 1200 | Asturias, Spain | | | |
| Real Monasterio de Nuestra Señora de Rueda | | 1202 | Ebro, Spain | 1835 | | Includes important hydrological works from the Middle Ages, including a dam on the Ebro and a massive waterwheel or "rueda", which diverted some of the river flow to a Gothic aqueduct for distribution to various parts of the monastery. |
| Monastery of Santa María la Real, Villamayor de los Montes | | | Burgos, Spain | | | |
| Our Lady of Bujedo de Juarros Abbey | | | Burgos, Spain | | | |
| Monastery of Santa María la Real de las Huelgas | | 1187 | Burgos, Spain | | | |
| Monasterio de Santa María de Solius | | 1967 | Girona, Spain | | | |
| Monastery of San Prudencio de Monte Laturce | | 12th century | Clavijo, Spain | | | The Monastery of San Prudencio de Monte Laturce, located in La Rioja, is a symbol of religious heritage and peace. Founded in the 12th century, it began as a small church built on the site where Saint Prudentius' remains were divinely guided to rest. |

== North America ==
=== Canada ===
| Abbey | Type | Founded | Location | Details | Website |
|---|---|---|---|---|---|
| Abbey of Notre-Dame du Lac | Trappist | 1881 | Oka, Quebec | | |
| Notre Dame du Calvaire Abbey | Trappist | 1902 | Nouvelle-Arcadie, New Brunswick | | |
| Notre-Dame de l'Assomption Abbey | Nuns (Trappist) | 1904 | Nouvelle-Arcadie, New Brunswick | | |
| Abbey of Notre-Dame-de-Nazareth | Monks | 1932 | Rougemont, Quebec | | |
| Abbey of Notre-Dame du Bon Conseil | Nuns (Trappist) | | Saint-Benoît-Labre, Quebec | | |
| Monastery of Notre-Dame de Mistassini | Trappist | | Dolbeau-Mistassini | | |
| Our Lady of the Prairies Abbey | Trappist | | Holland, Manitoba | | |
| Abbey Val Notre-Dame | Trappist | | Saint-Jean-de-Matha, Quebec | | |

=== United States ===
| Abbey | Type | Founded | Location | Details | Website |
|---|---|---|---|---|---|
| Abbey of Gethsemani | Trappist | 1848 | Trappist, Kentucky | Home of Thomas Merton | |
| New Melleray Abbey | Trappist | 1849 | Peosta, Iowa | Make wooden coffins. | |
| Our Lady of Spring Bank Abbey | Common Observance | 1920s | Sparta, Wisconsin | Closed 2011. Supported itself with financial investing, real estate, forestry and rental of farmland. It also operated "Laser Monks", which provided recycled laser toner and ink jet cartridges. | |
| Monastery of the Holy Spirit | Trappist | 1944 | Conyers, Georgia | | |
| Mount Saint Mary's Abbey | Nuns (Trappist) | 1949 | Wrentham, Massachusetts | Daughter house of St. Mary's Abbey (Glencairn, Waterford). | |
| Mepkin Abbey | Trappist | 1949 | Moncks Corner, South Carolina | Lumber, egg production, and dairy in the past. Now they produce shiitake and oyster mushrooms. | |
| Assumption Abbey | Trappist | 1950 | Ava, Missouri | | |
| Holy Cross Abbey | Trappist | 1950 | Berryville, Virginia | | |
| St. Joseph Abbey | Trappist | 1950 | Spencer, Massachusetts | Founded as Our Lady of the Valley Abbey in Central Falls, Rhode Island in 1900. Moved 1950 after a fire destroyed most of their buildings. They brew and produce incense. | |
| Abbey of the Genesee | Trappist | 1951 | Piffard, New York | | |
| Our Lady of Guadalupe Trappist Abbey | Trappist | 1955 | Lafayette, Oregon | The community moved from the abbey at Pecos, New Mexico (founded 1948) to Oregon, where farming gave higher yields. | |
| Abbey of New Clairvaux | Trappist | 1955 | Vina, California | | |
| St Benedict Monastery | Trappist | 1956 | Snowmass, Colorado | Now a former monastery. The property was sold in 2025 and is now privately held. | |
| Valley of Our Lady Monastery | Nuns (Common Observance) | 1957 | Prairie du Sac, Wisconsin | The first Cistercian nunnery in the United States, founded by nuns from the Swiss Abbey of Frauenthal. | |
| Our Lady of Dallas Abbey | Common Observance | 1958 | Irving, Texas | Founded from the Cistercian monastery of Zirc in Hungary. Runs the Cistercian Preparatory School in Irving, TX | |
| Our Lady of the Redwoods Abbey | Nuns (Trappist) | 1962 | Whitethorn, California | Founded from the Cistercian monastery of Nazareth in Belgium. | |
| Our Lady of the Mississippi Abbey | Nuns (Trappist) | 1964 | Dubuque, Iowa | Daughter-house of Mt. St. Mary Abbey in Wrentham, Massachusetts. | |
| Santa Rita Abbey | Nuns (Trappist) | 1972 | Sonoita, Arizona | | |
| Our Lady of the Angels Monastery | Nuns (Trappist) | 1987 | Crozet, Virginia | | |

== Australia and New Zealand ==
| Abbey | Type | Founded | Location | Details | Website |
|---|---|---|---|---|---|
| Tarrawarra Abbey | Trappist | 1954 | Victoria, Australia | Founded from Ireland. Since 1998 Tarrawarra has had a daughter house in Kerala, India: Kurisumala Ashram. | |
| Southern Star Abbey | Trappist | 1954 | Kopua, New Zealand | The Abbey is situated on a dairy farm between Dannevirke and Takapau, Central Hawke's Bay. | |

== South America ==
=== Brasil ===
| Abbey | Type | Founded | Location | Details | Website |
|---|---|---|---|---|---|
| Abadia de Nossa Senhora de São Bernardo | Monges (OCist.) | 1943 | São José do Rio Pardo | Com o rescrito da Sagrada Congregação para os Religiosos de 22 de fevereiro de 1943 e o decreto do Abade Geral de 25 de fevereiro do mesmo ano, erigiu-se canonicamente o Mosteiro de Nossa Senhora de São Bernardo, com direito de ter noviciado próprio. Por ocasião do Definitorium da Ordem em 1947, Dom Afonso Heun entregou a fundação de São José do Rio Pardo à Congregação de São Bernardo da Itália. Em 10/09/96 o Capítulo da Congregação elevou por unanimidade São José do Rio Pardo à categoria de Abadia. | |

== Asia ==
=== Hong Kong ===
| Abbey | Type | Founded | Location | Details | Website |
|---|---|---|---|---|---|
| Our Lady of Joy Abbey | | | Tai Shui Hang, Lantau, New Territories | | http://www.ourladyofjoyhk.org |

=== Vietnam ===
| Abbey | Type | Founded | Location | Details | Website |
|---|---|---|---|---|---|
| Abbatia B.M.V. de SS. Corde Iesu | Common Observance | | MY–CA | | |
| Abbatia B.M.V. de Phước Sơn | Common Observance | | PHƯỚC SƠN | | |
| Monastère de Châu Sơn | Common Observance | | CHÂU SƠN NHO QUAN | | |
| Abbatia B.M.V. de Châu Sơn ĐD | Common Observance | | CHÂU SƠN ĐƠN DƯƠNG- LÂM ĐỒNG | | |
| Abbatia Purissimi Cordis B.M.V. de Phước Ly | Common Observance | | PHƯỚC LÝ | | |
| Abbatia B.M.V. de Châu Thủy | Common Observance | | CHÂU THỦY | | |
| Abbatia B.M.V. de Thiên Phước | Common Observance | | THIÊN PHƯỚC | | |
| Monastère de Phước Vĩnh | Common Observance | | PHƯỚC VĨNH | | |
| Monastère de An Phước | Common Observance | | AN PHƯỚC | | |
| Monastère N.-D. de Vĩnh-Phước | Common Observance | | VĨNH PHƯỚC | | |
| Monastère N.-D. de Phước Hải | Common Observance | | PHƯỚC HẢI | | |
| Abbatia B.M.V. de Phước Thiên | Common Observance | | PHƯỚC THIÊN | | |

== See also ==
- Cistercian architecture
