= Civitella Casanova =

- Comune
- Comune di Civitella Casanova
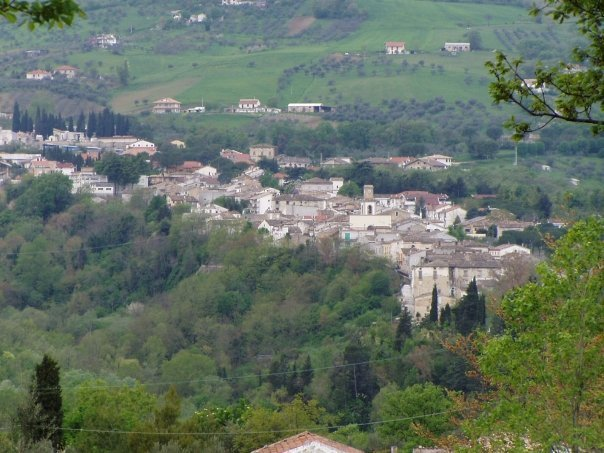
- View of Civitella Casanova

- Coat of arms

- Location within Italy Location within Abruzzo
- Coordinates: 42°22′N 13°53′E
- Country: Italy
- Region: Abruzzo
- Province: Pescara (PE)
- Frazioni: Baffo, Boragne, Brigantello, Castel Rosso, Centelle, Colle della Guardia, Festina, Madonna delle Grazie, Mirabello, Pastini, Pettorano, Topanera, Vestea

Government
  - Mayor: Marco D'Andrea (Obiettivo Comune)

Area
  - Total: 31 km^{2} (12 sq mi)
- Elevation: 400 m (1,300 ft)

Population (28 February 2010)
  - Total: 1,950
  - Density: 63/km^{2} (160/sq mi)
- Demonym: Civitellesi
- Time zone: UTC+1 (CET)
  - Summer (DST): UTC+2 (CEST)
- Postal code: 65010
- Dialing code: 085
- Patron saint: Madonna delle Grazie
- Saint day: Pentecost and following Monday and Thursday

Civitella Casanova is an Italian town of inland mountain of 1,950 inhabitants in the province of Pescara in Abruzzo and belongs to the mountain community Vestina. Listed on the National Park of Gran Sasso and Monti della Laga (in the District of Great Abbeys, which is home) and the Regional Reserve Voltigno and Valle d'Angri, a regional reserve included in the National Park, the country bases its economy mainly on agriculture. It has pre-Roman origins of repute, the sources of the historian Livy emerges as the town of Civitella was called Cutina or Cingilia (no one knows if it was anciently called Cutina then changing the name in Cingilia, or if the old part of town today said Terravecchia, had the name Cutina and the rest of the country in Cingilia, or if the two toponyms were equal).

Civitella Casanova is considered the home of arrosticini, to attest this is notified that in the town hall are the first licenses for the sale of arrosticini dating back to 1819, not owned by closely neighboring municipalities, the province of Pescara or other surrounding provinces. Civitella is defined as "the country that invented the arrosticini".

== Physical geography ==
The municipal district is large enough, it accommodates various environmental landscapes: the hills, high hills and mountains, to a minimum height of 240 metres (790 ft) and a maximum height of 1,581 metres (5,187 ft), with a vertical drop of 1,341 metres (4,400 ft). Located on the back of a hill 400 metres (1,300 ft) above sea level declining towards the confluence of the rivers Schiavone and Festina, the town still retains its ancient structure, it is also the most populous of the foothills of the Gran Sasso in the province of Pescara.

=== Territory ===
The current village, growing, grew in the foothills of the majestic Gran Sasso chain at the foot of Mount Cimoni—elevation 1,404 metres (4,606 ft), and Mt Colle Madonna, elevation 1,350 metres (4,430 ft)—from a village, relatively old and homely in dimensions, called Terravecchia. Built of stone and brick, this small village is situated on a rocky outcrop and is the most remote and evocative of the historic center in Roman times was called Cutina or Cingilia. On it stood the ponderous Castrum Rossi di Civitella, which was destroyed by a disastrous earthquake in 1456, and the Church of San Marco which today remains only a stone, on which there was built a new house, but left intentionally exposed by the owners. Subsequently, many buildings were swallowed by a landslide which brought with it a large part of the area, reducing the current strip of land we see today.

There was a need for the development of a new country: its subsequent expansion, in fact, led him to develop the hill to the west, up the slopes of the mountain. Its elongated shape today is crossed by a long straight axis, which some believe is one of the longer courses available throughout the province, bordered by rows of houses almost uninterrupted. The elevation of the town is known to be 400 metres (1,300 ft) above sea level, the point at which it is built the municipal building: few people know, however, that the highest point of the municipality measuring 1,581 metres (5,187 ft), height of the mountain Top of Cioccola observable by the fraction Baffo and Centelle, part of the town of Civitella. It is behind the mountains above Cimoni and Colle Madonna forming the plain with lace, or a barrier of rock composed of limestone pinnacles, which in fact is the door of the flat Voltigno. Civitella in higher altitudes has a large area of this plateau, which includes the three mountains of the town, because in these places has the typical characteristic landscape mountain, where there are large beech and oak and fir trees, we can find the area of wildlife chamois 'Abruzzo, where there are also buzzards, peregrine falcons, deer, the Apennine wolf, and the wild cat. The plateau of Voltigno is about 1,300 metres (4,300 ft) above sea level and is often visited by tourists and people who love the mountains, but there is also practiced sports, including cycling and cross-country skiing in winter. Just here, on the mountain Colle Madonna, originates the source of Rivo Clear that, by the eponymous waterfall frozen in winter, gives rise to stream Schiavone, fed by the waters of the Festina river, then the river confluence Nora. There is also a small karst lake, fed mainly by snowfall winter, Lake Background, the only one that dries up in summer in spite of the other small ponds that have the same origin. According to popular belief, the lake has no bottom and flows directly into the Adriatic Sea. Civitella Casanova also has a large area of natural interest outside the city center, in the district Furnace, you can visit the Zoo Park, the Cliff, while to the north of the Hill truncheons, in Festina location at 790 metres (2,590 ft) above sea level there is a spring of sulphurous water, usually not easily recepibile and conducive to many cures for acne, arthritis, asthma-like bronchitis, catarrhal bronchitis, eczema seborrico, lymphatism eretistico, acute articular rheumatism, rinofaringo - chronic laryngitis, and deafness. In addition, the spring has also become a tourist spot of the high mountains of the town and turned into a fountain, there are mountains in at least three other main sources for drinking water:

- Source Fonte Madonna, on the Mount of Civitellese Colle Madonna, the flow rate of l / s 5.0;
- Source Festina, always present on the mountain village of Civitella in Festina, the flow rate of l / s 0.5;
- Source Santanello in the municipality, but the slopes of Mount Bertona, in Santanello location, extent of l / s 0.5;

Seismic: Zone 2 (medium-high seismicity)

=== Position of the municipality ===
The core of the country stands on a hill and is about 41 kilometres (25 mi) from the provincial capital. With regard to the surrounding areas, the municipality is from:

- Carpineto della Nora: 3.9 kilometres (2.4 mi)
- Lanes: 2.7 kilometres (1.7 mi)
- Civitaquana: 4.5 kilometres (2.8 mi)
- Loreto Aprutino: 11.3 kilometres (7.0 mi)
- Pens: 10.9 kilometres (6.8 mi)
- Montebello di Bertona: 6.1 kilometres (3.8 mi)
- Villa Celiera: 3 kilometres (1.9 mi)
- Ofena: 11.2 kilometres (7.0 mi)

=== Climate ===
Although the town is located on the eastern side of Gran Sasso and then exposed to currents mitigatrici of the Adriatic Sea, contrary to what you might think, they are not sufficient to reach this area, which therefore present the typical mountain climate, with cold winters, dry and snowy, thanks to the current Balkan sometimes cold, and summers are dry and hot, with a low moisture content, as opposed to the coastal cities, even increased as a result of summer storms rinfescanti. These climatic conditions, characteristic of the Mediterranean climate allows the cultivation of extensive olive groves and vineyards present extensively throughout the country. Fmous oil Civitella, quality Carpinetana, and the wine of the area.

- Climate classification: Zone D, 1874 GG

== History ==
There is no received sources to flesh out an exhaustive and widely documentassero the history of this town as a result of German occupation during the years of the Second World War the Palace Jandelli and the municipal building, which at that time was not in today's home Palazzo Pulsoni in Corso Umberto I, but in a building on Via Vico Schools, close to Palazzo Pignatelli. This, however, can boast a historic and glorious existence, made known by the few surviving sources and documents, to which add the testimony of the inhabitants of the place, sometimes considered by university professors for special studies have revealed valuable information, later disclosed. In San Benedetto Roman remains have been found and came to light a stretch of underground aqueduct along with floors of homes and cemeteries. In ancient times the village was called Cutina, an ancient city of Vestini people who came into conflict with the Romans in the year of the consulate of Junius Brutus Sceva, the 325 BC In that time the city was mentioned by Livy. The name of Civitella appears for the first time in "Chronica S. Monasterii Casinensis". The country at that time was called Civitella dell'Abbadia for the presence of the monastery of Santa Maria di Casanova. The monastery was the first and most powerful of Abruzzo, the most illustrious and famous of the five Cistercian arising in the land of Abruzzo, and was erected in 1191 by the Countess Margarita, mother of Berardo II, Count of Laureto and Conversano, and was entrusted to the Cistercian Order in the 12th century with a rich endowment. Going forward in time the importance and prosperity of the monastery grew to the point that it, according to the Bindi, boasted among its fiefs the castrum of Rossi, which is to Civitella, the land of Carpineto, Fara, of Cretano of vestige of Brittoli and even the islands of Tremiti. Became so powerful that boast possessions in distant lands, as in Lucera in Apulia, to obtain the consent of Alexander IV in 1258 about the annexation and the total absorption of the thriving as illustrious monastery of San Bartolomeo di Carpineto, a project that was entitled to the political level the following year with a diploma of King Manfred. In times of prosperity, the monastery came to house 500 monks, many of which are devoted to the humanities, the transcription of the text and the thumbnail of the codes. Lived and worked Erimondo, a bookseller and minaturista digit code in Lombard born in Civitella Casanova. And if he is, thanks to the people of the area have been raised by the conditions of the serfs to that of expert farmers. Its codes were taken to Milan in the 17th century by Cardinal Federico Borromeo, abbot of the abbey, who ruled from 1591 until his death in 1631. The splendor of the monastery lasted for about seven centuries, during which the town developed with a certain peace of mind, living in the shadow of the abbey and following the instructions of the Cistercian fathers. We also remind you throughout all these years twinning Abbey Casanova, one of the most important and powerful of Abruzzo, with the Abbey of Casamari. Supervened, then, the decline and destruction by in 1807 during the reign of Joseph Bonaparte. Today there are only a few ruins of the monastery, on the border with the municipality of Villa Celiera. The country therefore had to fight not just in modern times to maintain its own identity and achieve full autonomy, especially in the neighboring countries.

=== Variations of the town and its administrative boundaries ===
The town of Civitella has always belonged to the Kingdom of the Two Sicilies until the unification of Italy, and more precisely to Giustizierato d'Abruzzo. In 1273 Charles I of Anjou, for better political administration of the territory, decreed the division into two administrative districts: the ultra Aprutium flumen piscariae and Apriutium citra flumen piscariae (Abruzzo beyond the river Pescara and Abruzzo to the side of the river Pescara), i.e. Giustizierato Abruzzo Ultra (around present-day provinces of L'Aquila, Teramo and most of the Pescara) and Giustizierato Abruzzo Citra (around present-day province of Chieti). However, in 1806 the giustizierato Abruzzo Ultra was once again divided into two new provinces: the province of Abruzzo Ultra I (the present province of Teramo, which also included most of present-day province of Pescara), and the province of 'Abruzzo Ultra II (now the province of L'Aquila, which included the 17 municipalities subsequently transferred to the province of Rieti and 2 to the province of Pescara). The province of Abruzzo Ultra I was administratively divided into two districts: the district of Teramo town with the same name, and the District of Città Sant'Angelo. Civitella was located in the latter, inserted in 1811 in the district of Catignano. The division of Giustizierato Abruzzo Ultra in the Province of Abruzzo Province of Abruzzo Ultra I and Ultra II was valid from 1806 to 1861, when, following the unification of Italy, the provinces were born and with it, districts, administrative subdivisions of the latter. The newly formed province of Teramo then included the territory of Abruzzo Ultra I, and his two new districts correspond with the territorial boundaries of the above districts:

- the district of Teramo, born from the district of Teramo, with capital of the same name;
- the District of Pens, born from the District of Città Sant'Angelo: it had as its capital Pens and was composed of five districts, including that of Catignano, which was part of Civitella.

This town was therefore always located in Abruzzo Further I, then equivalent of the province of Teramo, and specifically in the district of Città Sant'Angelo, which later became the District of Pens (set up in 1861 as an administrative subunit of the province of Teramo). In 1927 came the province of Pescara, was followed by the abolition of the districts of individual provinces and municipalities belonging to the district of pens, including Civitella, went to join the newly formed province (except the district of Bisenti who remained in the province of Teramo); They were joined in two municipalities in the province of L'Aquila already, plus another belonging to the province of Chieti already. Subsequently, in 1913, the town of Civitella underwent cleavage of one of its fractions, Celiera, which by royal decree issued that year (however, entered into force 1 January 1914) went on to form a municipality of its own.

== Earthquake of April 6, 2009 ==
The devastating earthquake that struck L'Aquila and its province has severely damaged the church and demolished the bell tower. The old town was severely damaged, leading to its total evacuation. The town of Civitella was placed by the Legislature on the list of common earthquake, known as "crater", which has received benefits, subsidies and aid in economic terms, such as the project MAP (Modules Temporary Premises), or 15 wooden houses for 15 families displaced in the country. Fortunately, the concussion he spared the church adjacent to the cemetery, the ancient Church of the Madonna della Cona, recently restored.

=== Active villages ===
Designed for the first time in Italy, "Borghi Active" is a project that will get a great importance and visibility at the national level. Involves five municipalities of the crater in Abruzzo who have suffered extensive damage from the earthquake, as well as Civitella Casanova, most populous municipality in the chosen hub for the neighboring suburbs and only interested in the province of Pescara, are co-protagonists of this important process also countries Fontecchio, Pescomaggiore, Santa Maria del Ponte and Fano Adriano. The goal is to rebuild the country with the active participation of the entire population of those areas through the creation of a "Statute Participated in the country." It will be prepared by the citizens Civitellesi with the municipal administration through a questionnaire that will tell the inhabitants of Civitella in: its history, its traditions and customs of the oldest houses and the mountains to create a common design for the future of the country. Civitella Casanova is one of the municipalities within the project "Active Villages", only in the province of Pescara and along with Fontecchio, Pescomaggiore, Santa Maria del Ponte and Fano Adriano. The goal is to rebuild the country with the active participation of the entire population of those areas through the creation of a "Statute Participated in the country".

"Active Villages is in fact a way to share decisions about the future planning of our territory, its economic development and social initiatives to be activated in response to the problems that the earthquake has created.'s The first time you try something like that in countries affected by the earthquake. Repairing houses is important, but that's not all we must at the same time, to ensure that the repaired buildings are used and lived in the well-being and satisfaction of citizens. choices that at this time we do, they will greater chance of success if you respond to the wishes of those who daily live these places. "

== Monuments and buildings ==
Civitella still keeps its ancient structure, in the city center is still possible to admire the most ancient and important monuments and buildings in the area.

=== Religious architecture ===
- Parish Church of Our Lady of Grace, of the 16th century with artistic fresco of the Virgin of the Rosary, now damaged by the earthquake of 2009, and is down in the red zone of the country.
- Church of the Madonna della Cona has medieval origins around the 13th/14th century), is a national monument that is located outside the town center, adjacent to the cemetery. The rich Renaissance portal stone was performed in 1529 by Bernardino Darz and Peter Aquilano, as stated on the pedestal of the left pilaster. The small bell is only one bow. The interior, with a nave, an ancient 16th-century fresco depicting a woman half-buried in snow while invoking the aid Madonna and some people try to rescue her. In the end wall of a 17th-century altar contains an image painted stucco depicting the Madonna and Child: this is the "Cona", that 's "icon", the venerated image, which gives the church its name. Until the early 1970s in the church was kept a large painting on canvas, 200 by 250 centimetres (79 by 98 in), depicting the Deposition of Christ bearing the inscription: for grace received Family De Carolis, 1866. Unknown thieves have cut along the edge of the frame and stolen. In its place, now, there is a painting by copying the ancient image. The church, preserved from the violence of the earthquake of L'Aquila, has become the new church.

Church of St. John, situated in the district of Terravecchia in the sports area of Sports and Municipal Pool San Giovanni, now in ruins, was open for the celebration of Mass on the feast of St. John the Baptist.

- Church of St. John the Baptist, in the district Pastini, a votive chapel is private.
- Church of St. Marko dating back to the times of feudalism if not yet previously, was built in the first nucleus of the old town, Terravecchia. Of this remains today only a massive stone walls.

=== Civil architecture ===
- Palazzo Bottini palace (also severely damaged by the earthquake) belonging to one of the most prestigious families of the place, looks out near the beginning of the old entrance road to the village, named after Egidio Bottini, naturalist and agronomist
- Jandelli palace, mansion where he was born Gaetano Jandelli, Professor of Philosophy at the Ateneo Milan after the unit and in recent times also used for exhibitions and tours, which has fallen down inside because of the earthquake in April 2009. During World War II, it became the headquarters of the Nazi Civitella and dintorni.Alcuni citizens claim that the Germans arrived in the country with horses that did sleep in the Mother Church, according to others, they arrived by motorcycle, but still occupied the building and the town hall.
- Palazzo Pignatelli, building with precious frescoes by the painter native Severino Galante (1750–1827), now damaged by an earthquake in April 2009 and during the restoration and renovation.
- Pulsoni palace, the town hall houses a board room and municipal library, Lorenzo Pulsoni.
- Palazzo De Blasiis, now the headquarters of the Carabinieri.
- Palazzo De Carolis, is an ancient villa located near the cemetery. When it was built, the country had not yet reached its full extent we see today up to this area, so this palace can be intso probably as a villa, but the concept of a time, or a manor house.
- Palazzo De Carolis, perhaps belonged to the same family as the building mentioned above, it is now tripartite vertically in separate dwellings, is located in Piazza Duca degli Abruzzi, next to the Mother Church, and was also hit hard by the earthquake of 2009.
- Angelozzi Villa and Villa Franci, are adjacent to each other
- Villa Granchelli, an ancient villa in the agricultural sense preceded by two rows of cypress trees, is school of Vanvitelli and is located in the district Civitellese St. Joseph, on the road that leads to the village of Civitella Casanova.
- Fontana di San Michele, a fountain recently restored, dates from around 1500, from what we read from the tile carved and can be accessed from the ring.
- The Abbey of Santa Maria Casanova was founded in 1191 by Cistercians. The power of the abbey extended to the monasteries surrounding and including that of Santa Maria a Mare in the Tremiti islands that were part of the town of Civitella. Was suppressed in 1807 during the reign of Joseph Bonaparte. Erimondo lived and died in the monastery, the abbot scribe expert in illuminated manuscripts. Today you can see some ruins, not protected for their artistic value, including the impressive and massive tower Casanova to the boundaries of the municipality of Villa Celiera.
- Remains of a Roman aqueduct, floors of homes and cemeteries, in the district of Saint Benedict, which is about 1 kilometre (0.6 mi) from the town, during excavations came to light a section of Roman aqueduct, portions of the pavements of Roman houses and a Roman necropolis testify therefore the presence of the people in this ancient area then called Cutina or Cingilia and its historical dating of the village to Roman times.

=== Military architecture ===
- Castrum Rossi di Civitella: the days of feudalism, near the present village resort in Kastellorizo stood a castrum, a fortified castle belonged to the powerful Rossi family, lords of the upper part that extends between the towns of Civitella and Villa Celiera it is possible to see the remains of the castle at the top of the Ditch Witch, whose ancient landslides have swallowed progressivamnto after the destruction, probably occurred because of the violent seismic activity, resulting in landslides, which in 1456 also devastated the town known in the 21st century as Terravecchia.

== Natural places of interest ==
- National Park of Gran Sasso and Monti della Laga;
- Regional reserve Voltigno and Valle d'Angri;
- Top of Monte Cioccola;
- Zoo-Park "La Rupe".

== Culture ==
=== Education ===
Civitella hosts the first three grades of compulsory education which Italian nursery school, primary school and secondary school level, also is the seat of the Presidency of Civitella '"Institute including kindergarten, elementary and middle B. Cross," which includes the towns and then the respective schools Carpineto, Villa Celiera, Faringdon and Montebello di Bertona.

=== Libraries ===
The newly opened public library is the "Lorenzo Pulsoni", not yet open to the public, located in a building which housed the town hall. There you can find a variety of information, from the history books, those of art, literature, Latin, and even those that deal with the particular country.

== Society ==
=== Traditions and folklore ===
The country still has its own customs and traditions, which usually occur every year. The best known are the summer events that color the summer Civitellese, as the feast of kebabs, and sagnarelle fasciule (in Civitellese dialect 'sagnarell and sides) or the festival of August, organized during the week of August, a variety of activities mostly evening, like that of the white night usually set up on August 16 in the town square. Added to these are the volleyball and soccer tournaments and fashion shows lingerie and costumes held in the Municipal Pool San Giovanni. Of particular interest are the celebration of the Solemnity of the Patron Saint. The protector is the Blessed Virgin Mary of the Graces. It took considerable force the feast of Pentecost, which was accompanied by three days of festivities religious and civil. During this period many of the faithful get to the church of Cona to attend religious functions, to profit from the "forgiveness" (plenary indulgence) and to participate in the spectacular procession on Tuesday afternoon. Has established also the tradition of celebrating a solemn Mass at 3:00 each April 6 to commemorate the terrible earthquake that struck the Abruzzo region in 2009. For the occasion, the statue is solemnly exposed Emidius bishop and martyr, patron against natural disasters and earthquakes. In addition to the above, recur every year other habits and traditions folklore festivals, such as the "Lu Sand'Andonie." It takes place on the Sunday that precedes January 17, in honor of Saint Anthony: the event is characterized by a long parade through the streets of the village where costumed animals of the ceremony go to rural tradition, such as mules, goats, dogs, geese, rabbits and even horses. Typical of the parade also the ancient decorated floats, once used in farm work. At the end of the parade are organized entertainment activities, such as theater performances of local companies and from surrounding countries, recalling key moments in the life of St. Francis, patron saint of animals and all the rural world. These are supplemented by the exhibition of sweets and most characteristic of the place, I Cieje de Sand'Andonie, in the local dialect means Civitellese Birds of St. Anthony, made with shortcrust pastry in the shape of bird (hence the name) with different decorations and filled with a tasty and aromatic filling or jam. Finally, we can mention the Torchlight Vestina, a long torch suitable for mountain lovers and hiking. It takes place every year on the day of the Immaculate Conception, December 8: starting from the town center (Piazza Risorgimento) means and their cars to arrive at an altitude of about 970 metres (3,180 ft) above sea level on the southwest of the mountains of Gran Sasso, hence each, properly equipped, the group follows the rocky path that leads to the summit of Mount Colle Madonna to 1,377 metres (4,518 ft) above sea level, on which there is a huge cross visible from country itself, especially in the sunniest days. Waiting for climbers, hikers and other participants, a big tent with hot tea and biscuits. The cross is illuminated by large headlights and the hilly site beyond the town of Civitella is visible in the distance. Those who participate on this tour in the evening, can enjoy the view of the village and the entire valley of the Pescara at full brightness. To return to the country to all the participants are offered a dinner of local products, accompanied by singing, dancing and games of folklore Abruzzo.

== Events ==
=== Cultural events ===
At the national level, in parallel with other events every summer at the National Stage Piano, Violin and Voice, now in its sixth edition, available at the camp Castel Rosso, a municipal post in mountainous area at 750 metres (2,460 ft) above sea level. It consists of a course of improvement of some pieces for piano or violin, presented by the musicians who take daily lessons with their teachers for a period of about a week. At the end of the activities follow one or more days of the concert, where all participants will perform in one of the songs improved public offering, with the assignment of a final certificate of participation. Participate mainly pianists and violinists of the place and the province, but in recent years the event is affecting many musicians from all over Italy, thanks to the presence of the famous masters of improvement Lucia Passaglia and Luigi Di Ilio for the piano, Eddy Perpich for violin and Akane Ogawa for singing.

=== Sporting events ===
Every year, in the hilly and mountainous area of civitella to life the manifestation of the Rally Pescara (i.e. the whole province of Pescara) that parade usually about 50 rally cars driven by drivers of the place and from every part of Italy.

== Typical products ==
- Arrosticini, also produced in neighboring countries, seem to be born here.
- Oil Civitella, Carpinetana quality, certified to go also to be the production of quality oil-Pescara Aprutino.
- DOC wine produced by most of the farmers who also possess extensive vineyards.
- Honey, produced and sold on site.
- Cheese and dairy products, high quality, thanks to the unpolluted pasture and mountain Voltigno.
- The Cieje de Sand'Andonie (in dialect), sweet pastry typical of the festivities in honor of Saint Anthony.

== Notable people ==
- Federico Borromeo, cardinal, commendatory of the Cistercian Abbey of Santa Maria Casanova.
- Jandelli Gaetano (1827–1923), philosopher, was born and lived in Civitella.
- Garrani Joseph (1891–1976), economist, Professor of Banking, Dean of the Faculty of Economics and Business at the University of Messina.

== Trivia ==
- Once there was a sign at the entrance of the village, then removed, with the inscription: "Who is not mad at Civitella not enter."
- There is also a saying of Civitella, almost a chant, in the local dialect Civitellese: "C'vtella Casanov casche n'derre e nz'artrov, se s' n'artrov p'zzitte C'vtell è nu buschitt, or "Civitella Casanova falls to the ground and can not be found, if he finds a piece, Civitella is a grove. "
- The elections on 15 and 16 May 2011 showed that, despite the inhabitants of the town are 1985, voters amounted to 2049.
- In his years in the country were a cinema and a gas plant well known in the area and point of reference for it for its production and export of gas.

== Administration ==
Period		Office holder	Party	Title	Notes
2006	2011	Alessandro Lattocco	lista civica	Mayor	
2011	in carica	Marco D'Andrea	lista civica	Mayor	
