= Santa Maria della Ferraria =

Monastery in Vairano Patenora, Italy

Cistercian Abbey of Santa Maria della Ferraria
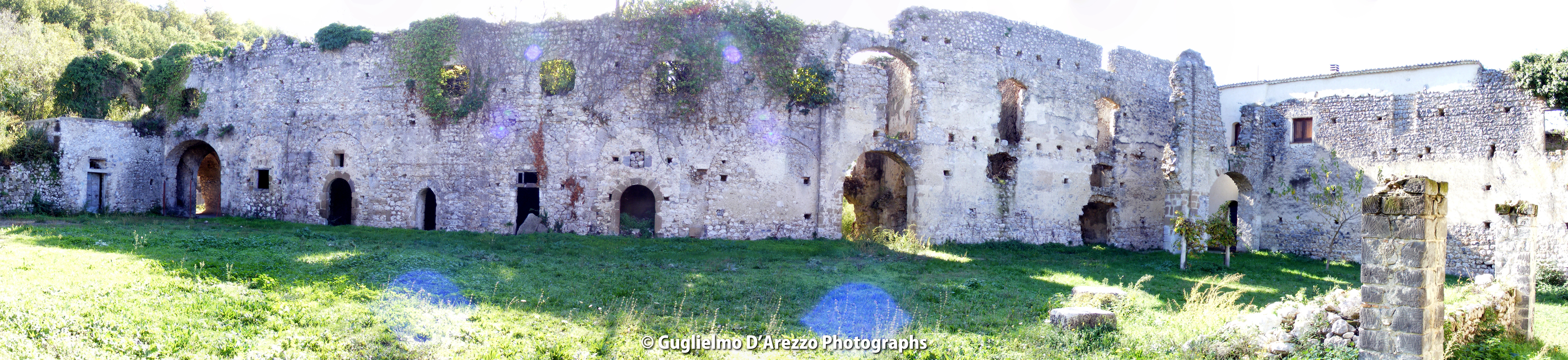

- Location within Italy
- Interactive map of Cistercian Abbey of Santa Maria della Ferraria

Monastery information
- Order: Cistercian
- Established: 1179
- Disestablished: 1807
- Mother house: Fossanova Abbey
- Diocese: Teano–Calvi

Site
- Location: Vairano Patenora, Italy
- Coordinates: 41.35177°N 14.15735°E
- Public access: yes

The Abbey of Santa Maria della Ferraria was a Cistercian monastery located in Vairano Patenora, Province of Caserta, Italy. Presently only ruins remain.

== History ==
It was founded in 1179 by monks from the abbey of Fossanova in Lazio, which had been funded by monks under the guidance of the Abbey of Clairvaux.

The church was consecrated on October 24, 1179 and the abbey was ruled by Cistercians until the suppression of religious orders in the Kingdom of Naples by Joseph Bonaparte in 1807.

The following monasteries were subservient to the abbey: Santa Maria dell'Arco (Sicily), Santo Spirito della Valle (Apulia), Santa Maria Incoronata (Apulia) and Santi Vito e Salvo (Abruzzo).

Around 1228, the Chronica Romanorum pontificum et imperatorum ac de rebus in Apulia gestis was composed at the abbey. It is an important source on the abbey's early history.

== See also ==
- List of Cistercian monasteries

== Bibliography ==
- Scandone, Francesco (1908). Santa Maria di Ferraria (in Italian). Napoli: Stabilimento tipografico M. D'Auria. p. 48.
- Oldoni, Umberto; Caperna, Francesco (2008). Cronaca Santa Maria della Ferraria (in Italian). Cassino: Francesco Ciolfi editore. p. 301. ISBN 978-88-86810-35-7.
