= Kopua vermiculata =

Conservation status
- Data Deficient (IUCN 3.1)

Scientific classification
- Kingdom: Animalia
- Phylum: Chordata
- Class: Actinopterygii
- Order: Blenniiformes
- Family: Gobiesocidae
- Genus: Kopua
- Species: K. vermiculata

Binomial name
- Kopua vermiculata Shinohara & Katayama, 2015

Species of fish

Kopua vermiculata, the twilight clingfish, is a clingfish of the family Gobiesocidae, found only around Japan. This species reaches a length of 2.7 cm (1.1 in).
