= Abbey of San Pastore =

Partially ruined monastery in Italy

- Abbazia di San Pastore
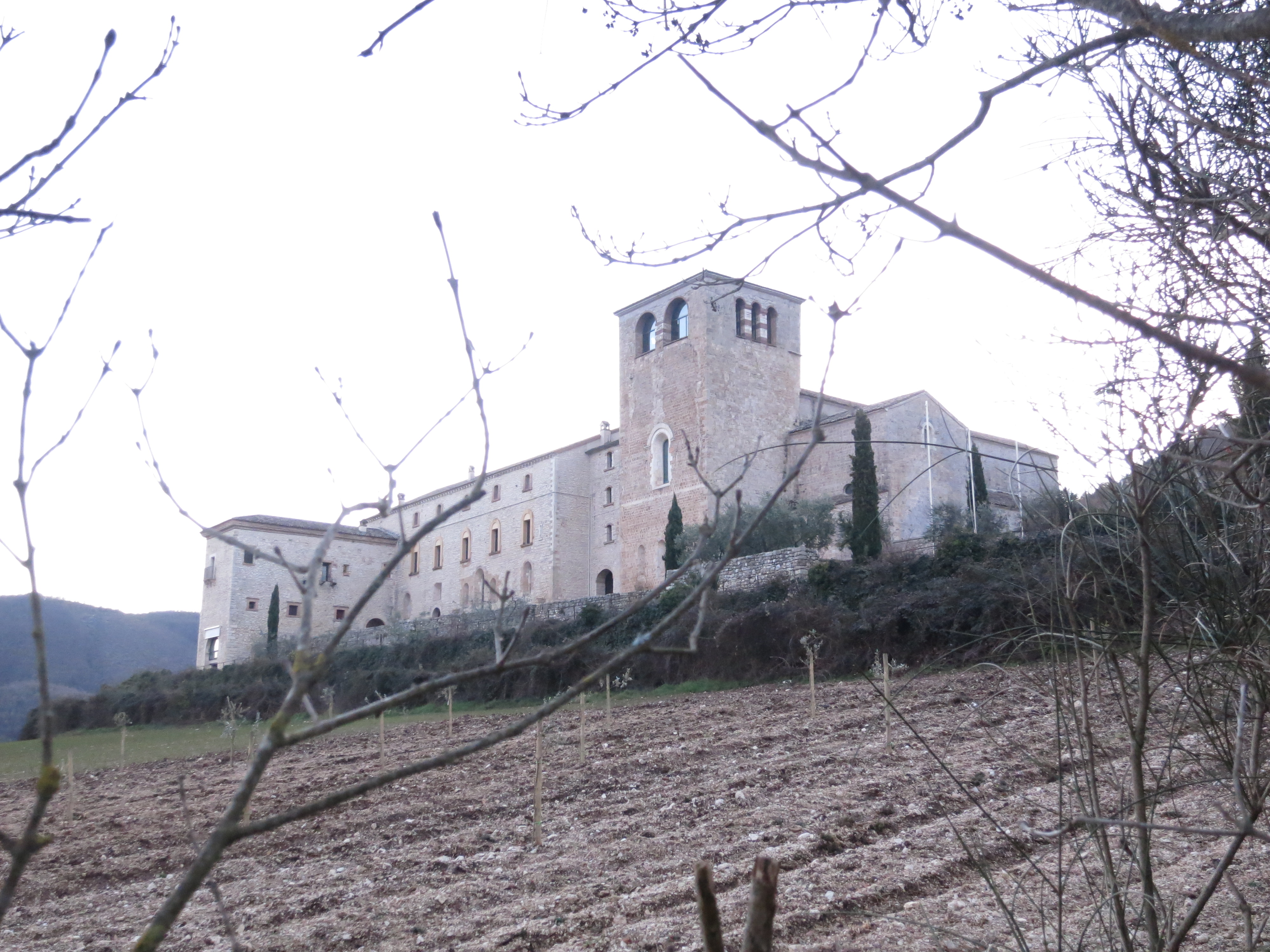
- Abbey of San Pastore
- 42°25′49″N 12°45′35″E
- Location: Contigliano, Lazio
- Country: Italy
- Denomination: Catholic
- Religious institute: Cistercians
- Website: https://www.abbaziadisanpastore.com/

Architecture
- Architect: Mastro Anselmo
- Style: Romanesque art
- Completed: 1264

Administration
- Diocese: Roman Catholic Diocese of Rieti

The Abbey of San Pastore is a partially ruined former Cistercian monastery located in the province of Rieti in the countryside between Contigliano and Greccio. It is part of the "path of Francis," the pilgrimage route that unites the four Franciscan sanctuaries in the Sacred Valley; the via Benedicti, a route that unites Benedictine places in central Italy; and finally the cammino dei Templari, a route that concerns the Knights of the Temple.

== Story ==
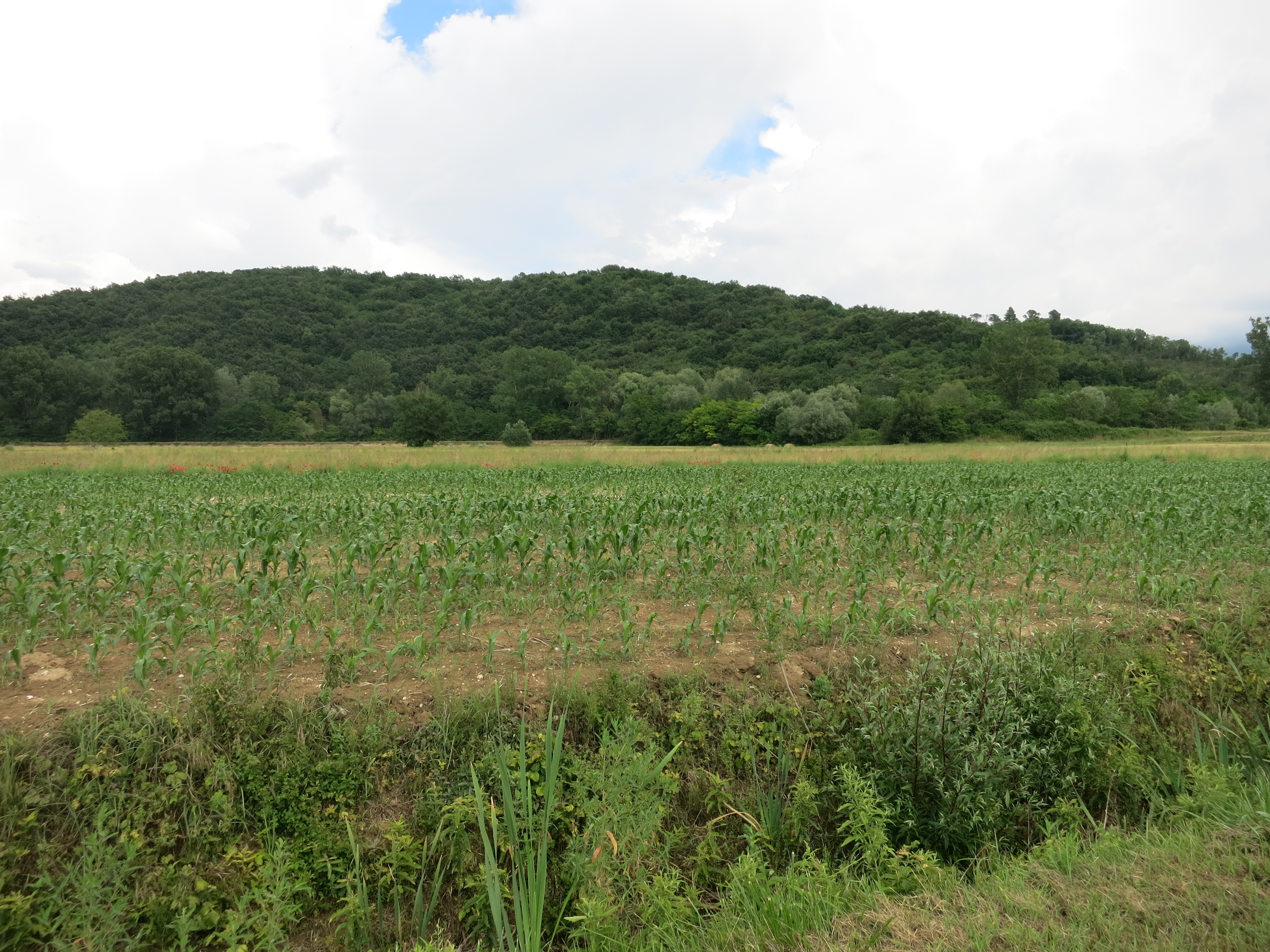
The hill of Monticchio

The Abbey of San Pastore traces its origins to an earlier structure: the Abbey of San Matteo de Monticulo, which stood on the Hill of Shepherd, a small rise in the Piana Reatina near the lake known as Montilacu, named for the hill of Monticchio that stood in the center of the lake.

The primitive abbey was founded in 1137 when Bernard of Clairvaux sent a colony of monks to Rieti headed by the holy abbot Balduino: they settled in Monticulo, where a structure of the Benedictine order already existed.

The abbey soon became so important that in May 1205, it received as a gift from the municipality of Rieti all the lands located in the surroundings.

In 1218, a nucleus of friars from the Abbey of Santa Maria di Casanova was sent to reform the monastery.

The Abbey of San Matteo was penalized by the unhealthy environment of Monticchio. At that time, due to the obstruction of the Curiana Quarry, the Piana Reatina had once again been invaded by the lacus Velinus (then called the Lake of Rieti). This prompted the monks to seek a location farther from the valley floor, so on March 14, 1234, at the springs of Santa Susanna, Cardinal Goffredo Castiglione (future Pope Celestine IV) ratified a contract by which the abbey was moved to the area of San Pastore, in which a corte, a group of houses with a church, had already been known to exist since the 8th century.

The construction of the abbey was directed by the architect Mastro Anselmo and began on the morning of May 5, 1255, under the rule of Abbot Andrew, Prior Robert, and Vice Prior Palmiero; this information comes from two tombstones on the site until the 1930s, which were believed to have been stolen but were instead recently found at the bottom of a well. By 1264 the church had been completed.

The abbey was at first very rich and powerful and contributed to the expenses for the maintenance of roads and bridges of the municipality of Rieti.

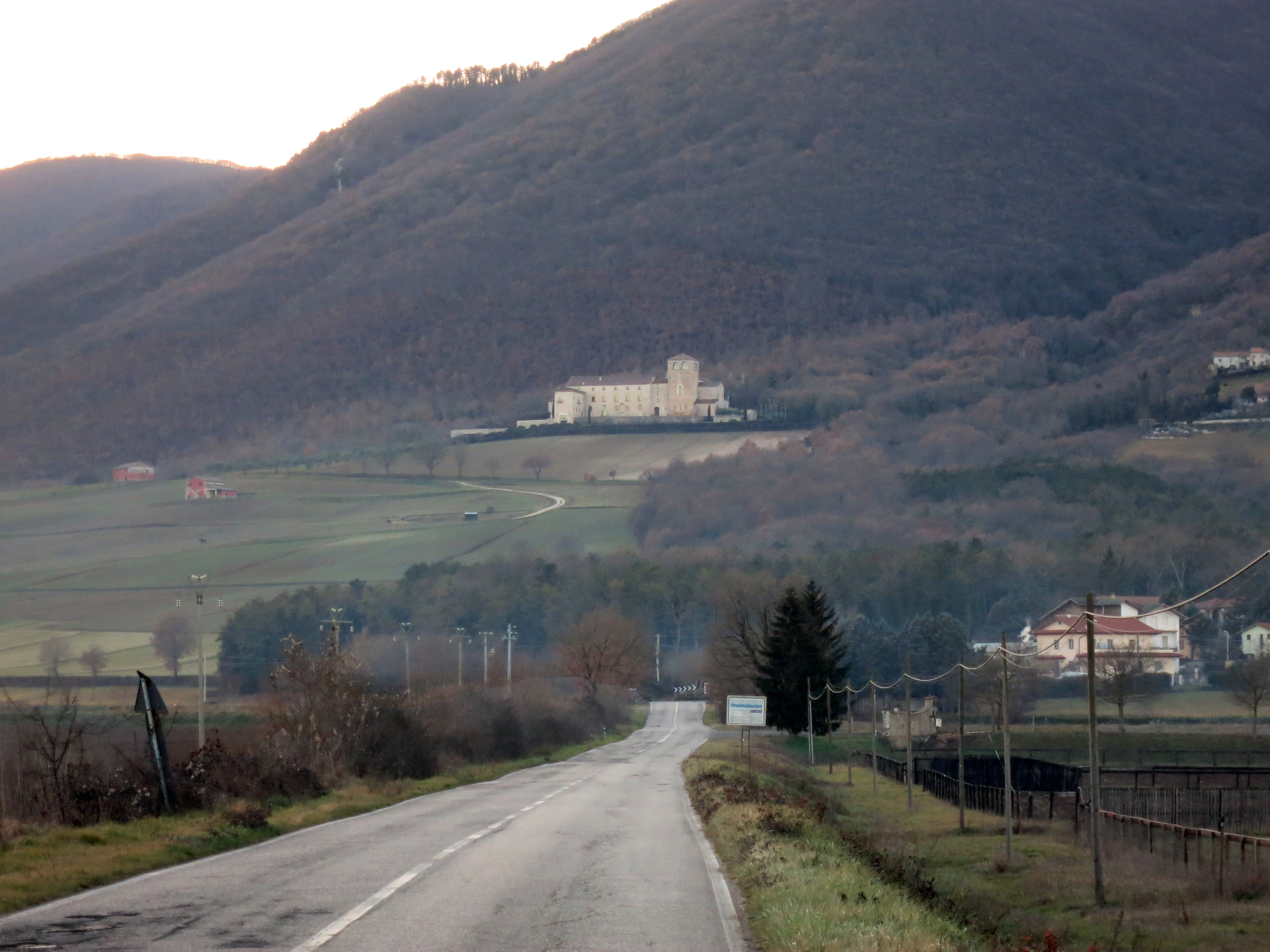
L'abbazia vista dalla Piana Reatina

Subsequently, a period of decline began, due to the bad administration and poor morality of the monks: traces of this situation can be found in the accounts of the apostolic visitors of the time, and 1373 Pope Gregory XI commissioned the abbot of San Lorenzo Outside the Walls to visit and reform the monastery. The material and spiritual degradation, however, did not stop, and in 1426 the abbey was given in commenda, effectively delivering its patrimony into the hands of the commendatory abbots and their families.

In this century, noting the impossibility of securing the custody of the ancient abbey building of San Matteo, the remains of San Balduino were moved to the Cathedral of Rieti, while the ancient structure was left to itself.

The Cistercians, who had long since begun to break away from San Pastore, left the abbey for good in 1561. In their place came the Canons Regular of the Lateran in 1580.

In 1582, the commendatory abbot Marcantonio Colonna divided the ownership of the abbey into two parts, one belonging to the commendatory and the other to the regular clergy (represented at that time by the Laterans).

The Laterans abandoned the abbey during the seventeenth century. In 1786 the part due to the commendators was ceded in emphyteusis to the Roman nobles Santacroce-Publicola, upon payment of a fee of three hundred scudi a year, and in 1799 (following the Napoleonic invasion) the part due to the regular clergy was also suppressed. In 1814, after the Restoration, Pius VII again gave the abbey in commendation until, in 1843, the entire building was sold to the Rhaetian marquises Ludovico and Basilio Potenziani, who took over the commendatory part from the Camera Apostolica and the emphyteusis part from the Santacroce-Publicola.

From that time on, the abbey was abandoned and fell into a deep state of decay, which persisted until the threshold of the third millennium: the roof collapsed, it was overrun by grass, and because of the broken fixtures, the most valuable artistic relics were stolen: frescoes, fireplaces, doorposts, doors, squared ashlars, and even a stone spiral staircase.

In the early 20th century, the Ministry of Education, with the contribution of Prince Ludovico Potenziani, made partial repairs to the building and Giuseppe Colarieti Tosti restored the church frescoes, but the state of decay was not resolved and looting continued.

In the 1980s, the building was purchased by entrepreneur Antonio Antonacci, who with his private resources finally initiated the restoration of the abbey. Work began in 1988 and is now mostly completed.

Today the site is used for events such as workshops, corporate meetings, weddings, receptions, exhibitions, and concerts, while four suites are being set up that will make the abbey capable of tourist accommodation.

== Description ==
The abbey is located on the western edge of the Piana Reatina, perched on the Monti Sabini, in the municipal territory of Contigliano but a short distance from Greccio. It can be reached from Spinacceto (a hamlet of the latter municipality), where "via San Bernardo da Chiaravalle," a dirt road that climbs through a pine forest to the abbey, departs from the municipal road to Greccio. It can be visited only after contacting the managers.

The abbey is built around a cloister and includes the church, chapter house, parlor, sacristy, and abbot's apartment. Also to the east is a small Baroque apartment, made in 1686 by the abbot, Cardinal Fulvio Astalli. The bell tower, at the rear of the church, dominates the Piana Reatina and was also intended to play a role of defense and observation; the year 1292 and the name of the bell founder, Dominicus Urbevetanus, are engraved on the main bell.

Although recently restored, during its long neglect, the abbey was despoiled of many of its decorations.

According to Negri, the abbey of San Pastore is an example of "Cistercian achievement of a still archaic cut because of the continuous and consistent use of stylistic features ascribable to the Order's first construction phase, such as the pointed barrel vault on the apsidal part (and perhaps on the entire church), the round arches in the chapter house, and the ogives always in a straight section, which refer to other Italian churches of the period-Falleri, Tre Fontane, San Nicola di Agrigento."

=== Cloister and chapter house ===
The current form of the cloister dates from 1638 when the Lateran Canons restored it.

The chapter house has two mullioned windows and is entered using a pointed arch door. The ceiling consists of large cross vaults, which rest not on counter-pillars but on large corbels; traces of votive frescoes from the 14th century can be seen on the vaults.

=== Church ===
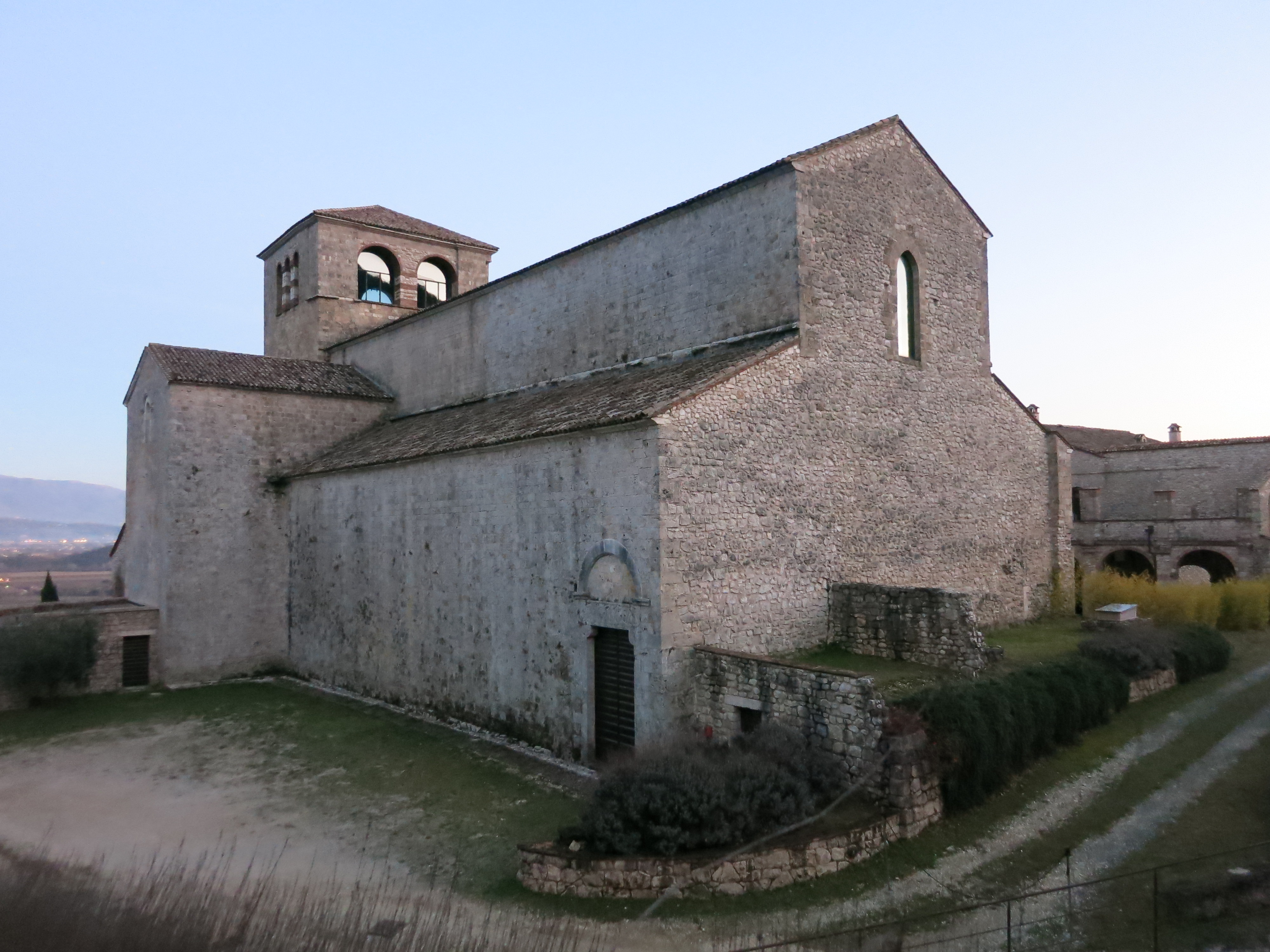
The church

The abbey church has no real facade and is entered through two entrances: the main one on the left flank (north side) and the other on the right flank (south side), which leads into the monastery cloister.

It has a Latin cross plan, divided inside into three naves by square pillars; each nave is covered by five arched bays, of which only those in the right nave remain. The transept has a large development because of the Cistercian tradition of separating the church into a part for the monks and one for the faithful. The choir is square and is flanked by the church's only chapels.

A valuable painting of the Crucifixion, dating back to the 16th century and depicting Christ crucified, Mary Magdalene weeping, the Virgin, St. Thomas, St. John the Evangelist, and St. Matthew, was also originally in the church. The canvas, which according to Sacchetti Sassetti is to be attributed to the Veronese brothers Lorenzo and Bartolomeo Torresani while according to Palmegiani it has the characteristics of the Umbro-Roman school, was moved by the Potenziani to the small church of an estate they owned.

=== Abbot's apartment ===
Initially this building was used as a dormitory for the monks; in 1534, Cardinal Agostino Spinola (abbot from 1518 to 1537) decided to turn it into the personal apartment of the commendatory abbot, decorating it with frescoes depicting festoons and joyful scenes. The upper floor, which no longer exists today, was used as the monks' dormitory.

Of the 16th-century building, one can still admire the doors with stone lintels and some remnants of the ornamental frescoes, almost all of which were stolen along with the precious fireplace.

== See also ==
- Province of Rieti
- Rieti Valley
- Farfa Abbey

== Bibliography ==
- Theseider, Eugenio Dupré (1919). L'abbazia di San Pastore presso Rieti [The abbey of San Pastore near Rieti] (in Italian). Archivio di Stato di Rieti: Tipografia fratelli Faraoni.
- Palmegiani, Francesco (1932). Rieti e la Regione Sabina. Storia, arte, vita, usi e costumi del secolare popolo Sabino: la ricostituita Provincia nelle sue attività [Rieti and the Sabine Region. History, art, life, customs and traditions of the centuries-old Sabine people: the reconstituted Province in its activities] (in Italian). Archivio di Stato di Rieti: edizioni della rivista Latina Gens. p. 383-386.
- Verani, Cesare (1980). L'abbazia di San Pastore: ragioni di un restauro [San Pastore Abbey: reasons for restoration] (in Italian). Archivio di Stato di Rieti.
- Formichetti, Gianfranco (1997). L'Abbazia di San Pastore [Abbey of San Pastore] (PDF) (in Italian). Rieti: Associazione dimore storiche. Archived from the original (PDF) on 13 January 2017.
