= Santi Vito e Salvo =

Cistercian Abbey of Santi Vito e Salvo
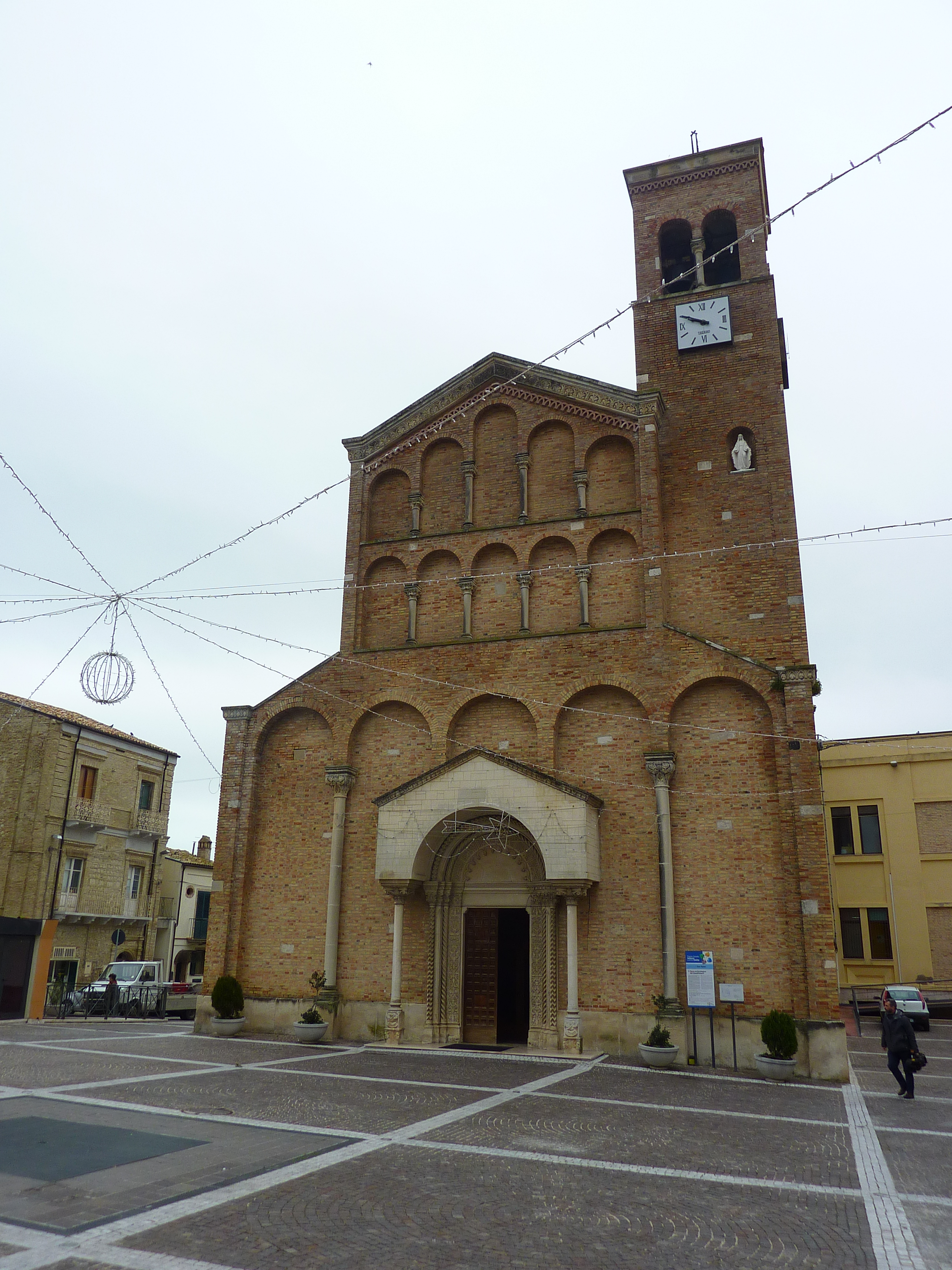

- Location within Italy
- Interactive map of Cistercian Abbey of Santi Vito e Salvo

Monastery information
- Order: Cistercian
- Established: 1247
- Disestablished: 1453
- Mother house: Santa Maria della Ferraria
- Diocese: Chieti–Vasto

Site
- Location: San Salvo, Italy
- Coordinates: 42.044911°N 14.731504°E
- Public access: yes

The Abbey of Santi Vito e Salvo (Italian: Abbazia dei Santi Vito e Salvo) was a Cistercian monastery located in San Salvo, Province of Chieti, Italy.

== History ==
It was founded in 1247 by the mother abbey Santa Maria della Ferraria in Campania, of the line of Abbey of Clairvaux.

At the beginnings, the location selected for the abbey was in a swampy area close to San Salvo, but the harsh living conditions pushed the monks to move inside the town.

The abbey developed in the area nowadays known as "il quadrilatero", but it was abandoned in 1453 after an attack launched by the Turks.

== Architecture ==
The structures of the abbey are completely lost, with new buildings constructed around the squared area of the original closter.

The new church of San Giuseppe was built in place of the previous one: the only remains of the original building are two lancet windows on the side of the church. The original well of the abbey was discovered during recent excavations.

== See also ==
- List of Cistercian monasteries

== Bibliography ==
- Mammarella, Luigi (1995). "Santi Vito e Salvo sul Trigno". Abbazie e monasteri cistercensi in Abruzzo (in Italian). Cerchio (AQ): Adelmo Polla Editore. pp. 111–113. ISBN 8874070276.
