= Chronica Romanorum pontificum et imperatorum ac de rebus in Apulia gestis =

The Chronica Romanorum pontificum et imperatorum ac de rebus in Apulia gestis ("Chronicle of the Roman Bishops and Emperors and of the Deeds Done in Apulia") is a 13th-century Latin prose chronicle by an anonymous monk of the monastery of Santa Maria della Ferraria in southern Italy. It is sometimes called the Ferraris Chronicle, Chronica Ferrariensis or Chronicle of Santa Maria di Ferraria. The chronicle was rediscovered in Bologna in the nineteenth century and published in English translation in 2017.

It is a single undivided text, conceived as a continuation of the Chronica maiora of Bede. It covers events from 781 until 1228, when it abruptly ends. It is most valuable for the Norman period in southern Italy and for events connected with the monastery of Santa Maria. However, its last section, covering the reign of Frederick II, whom the chronicler met, is original and written in the present tense.

The author had access to now lost portions of the chronicle of Falco of Benevento, which in its surviving form covers the years 1103–1140. The Chronica Romanorum thus extends Falco's narrative to the years 1099–1103 and 1140–49.

The format and scope of the chronicle's text has led to its characterization as the first history of the Kingdom of Sicily.

== Sources ==
- Alio, Jacqueline, ed. (2017). The Ferraris Chronicle: Popes, Emperors, and Deeds in Apulia 1096–1228 (Translation). New York: Trinacria. ISBN 978-1-943-63916-8.
- Bonardi, Giovanna (2001). La cronaca di Santa Maria di Ferraria (741–1228): Struttura, fonti e contesto storico di una cronaca del Regno (PhD thesis deposited at National Library, Florence). Università degli Studi di Palermo.
- Chalandon, Ferdinand (1907). Histoire de la domination normande en Italie et en Sicile. Vol. 1. Paris: Alphonse Picard.
- Gaudenzi, Augusto, ed. (1888). "Chronica Romanorum pontificum et imperatorum ac de rebus in Apulia gestis". Ignoti monachi cisterciensis S. Mariae de Ferraria chronica et Ryccardi de Sancto Germano Chronica priora. Monumenti storici, Serie I: Cronache 3. Naples: Società napoletana di storia patria. pp. 1–46.
- Lozzi Gallo, Lorenzo (2012). "Chronica Romanorum pontificum et imperatorum ac de rebus in Apulia gestis". In Dunphy, Graeme (ed.). Encyclopedia of the Medieval Chronicle. Brill Online.
