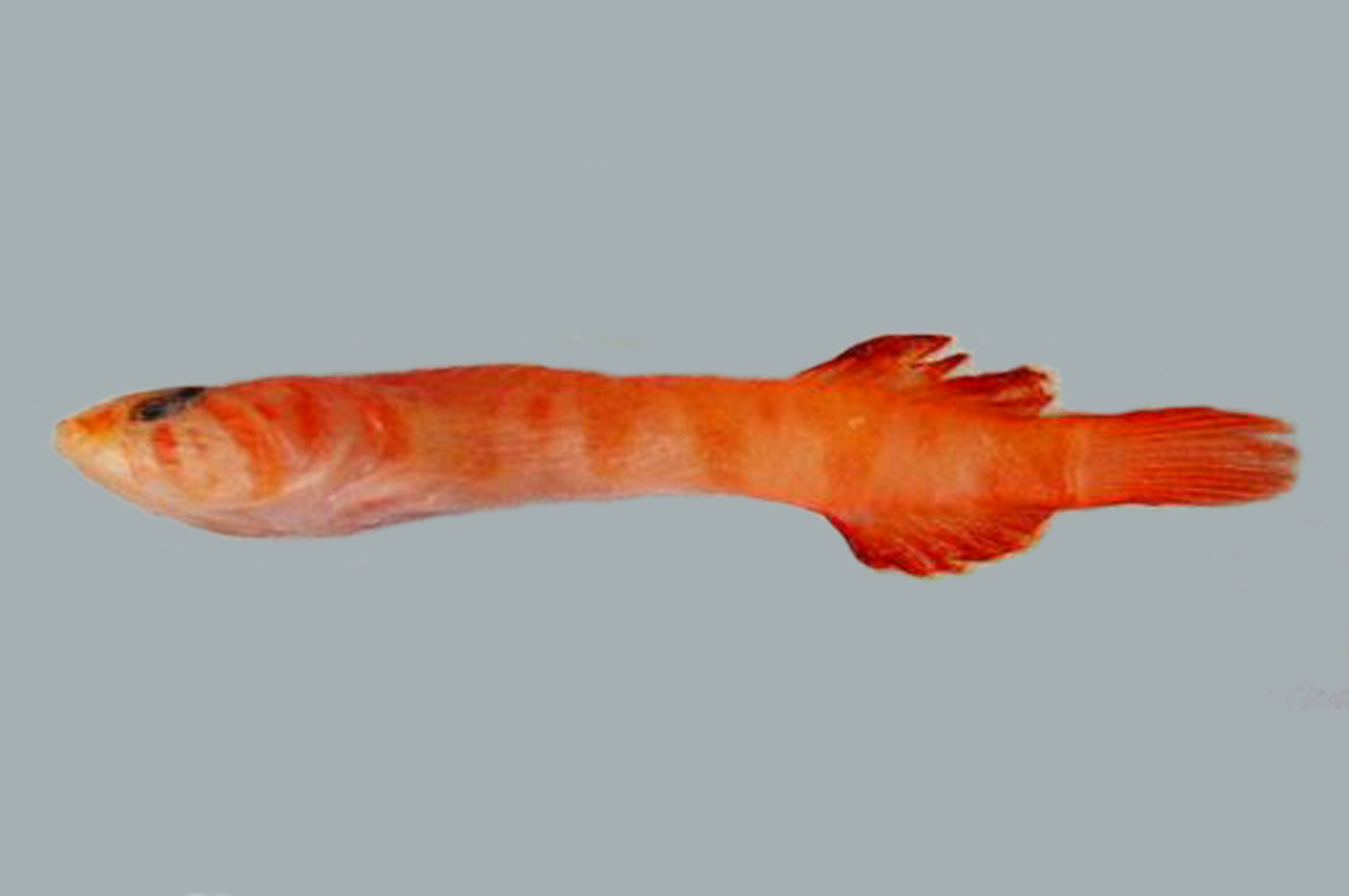

Conservation status
- Least Concern (IUCN 3.1)

Scientific classification
- Kingdom: Animalia
- Phylum: Chordata
- Class: Actinopterygii
- Order: Blenniiformes
- Family: Gobiesocidae
- Genus: Kopua
- Species: K. kuiteri

Binomial name
- Kopua kuiteri Hutchins, 1991

= Kuiter's deepsea clingfish =

Species of fish

Kuiter's deepsea clingfish (Kopua kuiteri) is a clingfish of the family Gobiesocidae, found only off southern Australia, at depths of between 90 and 110 metres (300 and 360 ft).

== Etymology ==
The clingfish is named in honor of Australian underwater photographer Rudolf “Rudie” Kuiter (b. 1943), who collected the type specimen and provided color transparencies showing the fish's life coloration.
