= San Salvo =

- Comune
- Città di San Salvo
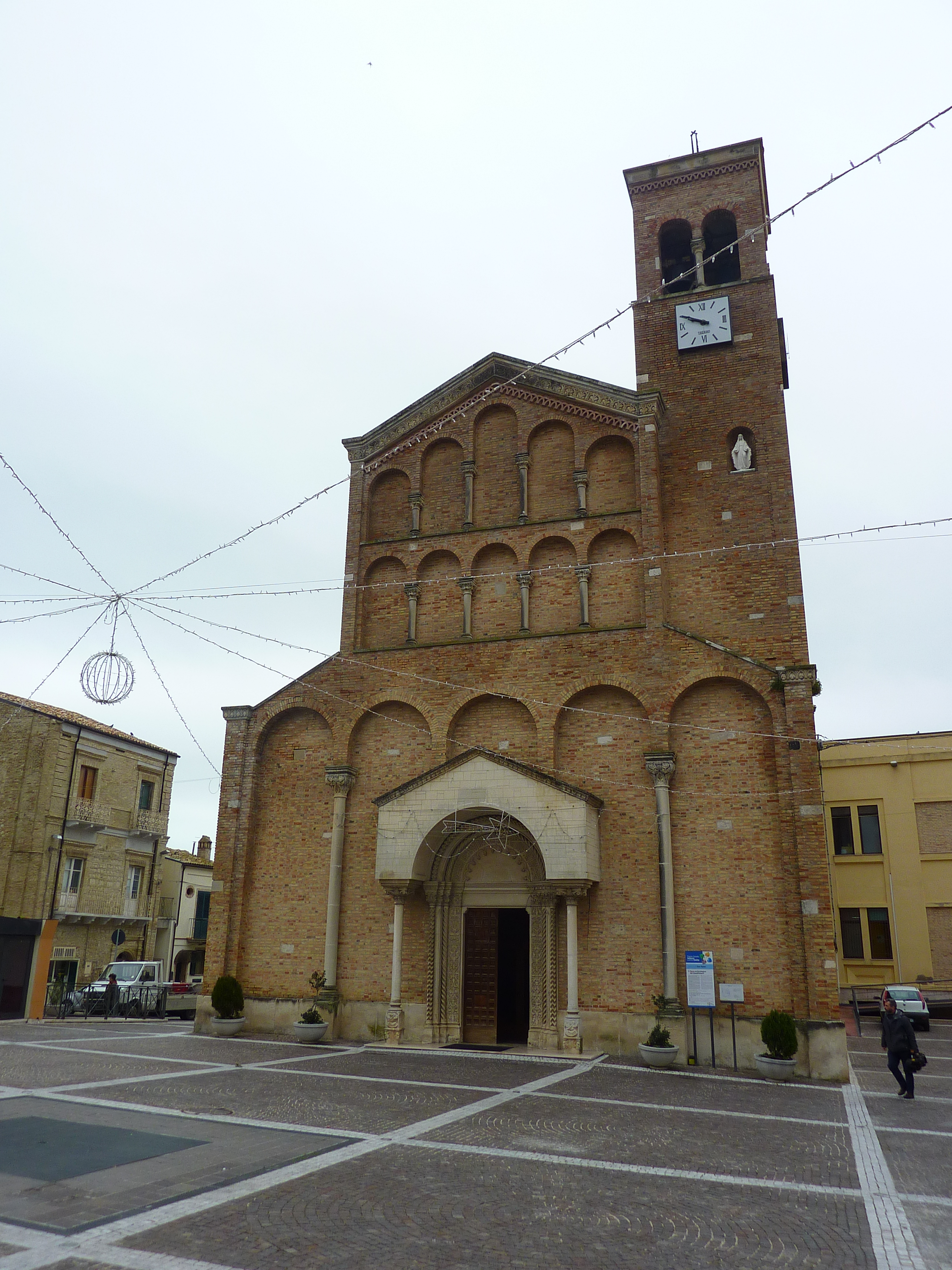
- Chiesa San Giuseppe

- Location within Italy Location within Abruzzo
- Coordinates: 42°3′N 14°43′E
- Country: Italy
- Region: Abruzzo
- Province: Chieti (CH)
- Frazioni: Ributtini, San Salvo Marina, San Salvo Stazione

Government
  - Mayor: Tiziana Magnacca (PdL)

Area
  - Total: 19.51 km^{2} (7.53 sq mi)
- Elevation: 100 m (330 ft)

Population (January 1, 2023)
  - Total: 19,688
  - Density: 1,009/km^{2} (2,614/sq mi)
- Demonym: Sansalvesi or salvanesi
- Time zone: UTC+1 (CET)
  - Summer (DST): UTC+2 (CEST)
- Postal code: 66050
- Dialing code: 0873
- ISTAT code: 069083
- Patron saint: San Vitale
- Saint day: 28 April
- Website: Official website

San Salvo (Abruzzese: Sàndë Sàlvë) is a comune and town in the Province of Chieti in the Abruzzo region of Italy. It is the last Abruzzo town on the Adriatic coast before entering the Molise Region.

San Salvo is divided into two major urban areas: San Salvo city and San Salvo Marina.

On the top of its seaside touristic and agricultural resources, San Salvo has a large industrial park which hosts glass-related business organizations.

San Salvo is 52 miles from Abruzzo Airport and the closest hospital is in Vasto, 13 mile drive distance. The nearest train station is just outside city limits, Vasto-S. Salvo Station, approximately 2.6 miles from city center.

== Geography ==
The municipality of San Salvo is bordered to the north by the Buonanotte valley and to the east by the Adriatic Sea. The town borders the municipalities of Cupello, Vasto and Montenero di Bisaccia. The city is located in a hilly area, 128m above sea level. The towns coast is 3km.

== Festival and traditions ==
Every year from 26 until 28 April, San Salvo hosts the "San Vitale Festival". It is a traditional city festival dedicated to the celebration of Saint Vitale. During these days several farmers donate durum wheat flour to the San Vitale church, all taking place during a folkloristic procession of decorated tractors. This flour is then being used for the production of traditional taralli and sagne pasta that is eventually distributed among the festival participants.

== History ==
San Salvo is a medieval name, probably of the 9th or 10th century. It is assumed that in Roman times in the area of San Salvo was located "The city of Buca." The extension of the Roman city was equivalent to at least four times that of the medieval town.

In the middle of the town, the archaeological area known as "il quadrilatero" is the place formerly used by the Cistercian abbey of Santi Vito e Salvo.

== Points of interest ==
- San Salvo Marina e Lungomare di San Salvo Marina
- Giardino Botanico Mediterraneo
