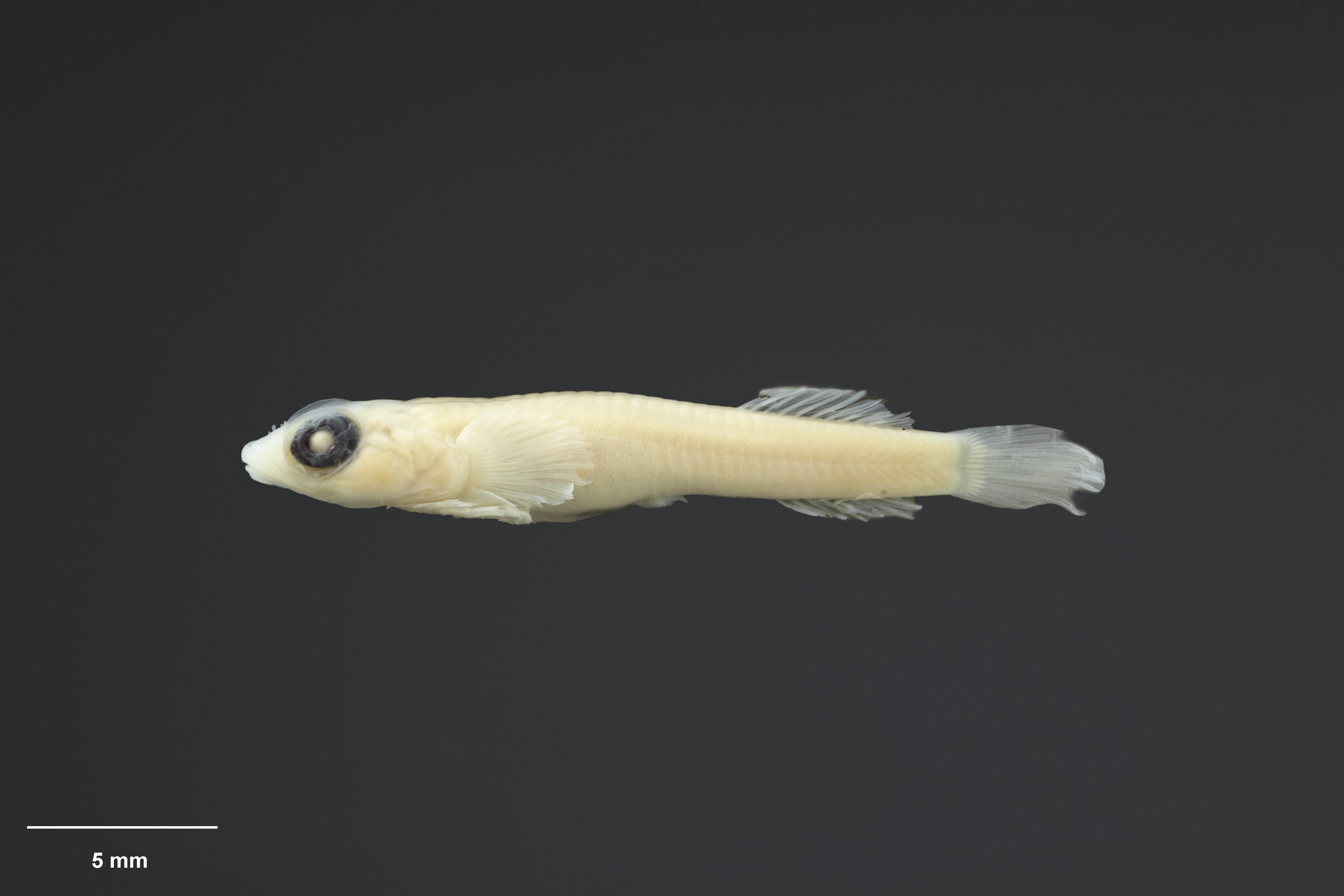
- Holotype of Kopua nuimata at Te Papa

Conservation status
- Least Concern (IUCN 3.1)

Scientific classification
- Kingdom: Animalia
- Phylum: Chordata
- Class: Actinopterygii
- Order: Blenniiformes
- Family: Gobiesocidae
- Genus: Kopua
- Species: K. nuimata

Binomial name
- Kopua nuimata Hardy, 1984

= Kopua nuimata =

Species of fish

Kopua nuimata also known as bigeye clingfish is a clingfish of the family Gobiesocidae, found only around New Zealand. It is the smallest coastal fish species that is endemic to New Zealand waters, measuring up to 40 mm (1.6 in).
