= Giardino Botanico Mediterraneo =

Botanical garden in Italy

Coordinates: 42.0781°N 14.7529°E

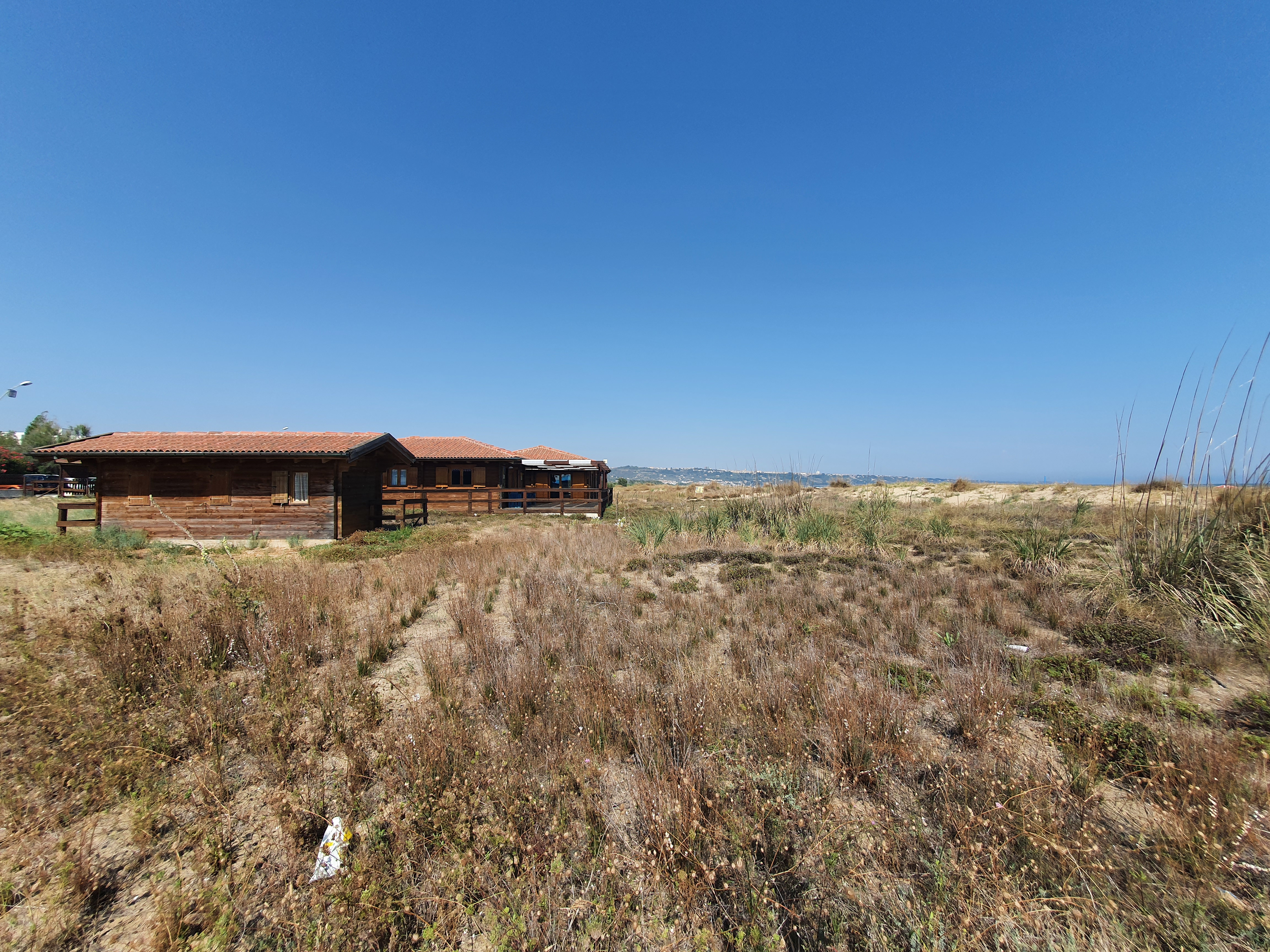
View of Giardino botanico mediterraneo

The Giardino Botanico Mediterraneo (10 hectares) is a botanical garden located along the Adriatic Sea about 2 kilometers north of San Salvo, Province of Chieti, Abruzzo, Italy. It is open Monday through Friday in the warmer months; an admission fee is charged.

The garden was established in 2001 by the Municipality of San Salvo to recreate and conserve a strip of typical Adriatic sand dunes, and to preserve plant species at risk of extinction. It currently contains about 300 species. The total site occupies 25 hectares, of which 15 are within the sea itself.

== See also ==
- List of botanical gardens in Italy
- Orto Botanico del Mediterraneo (Livorno)
