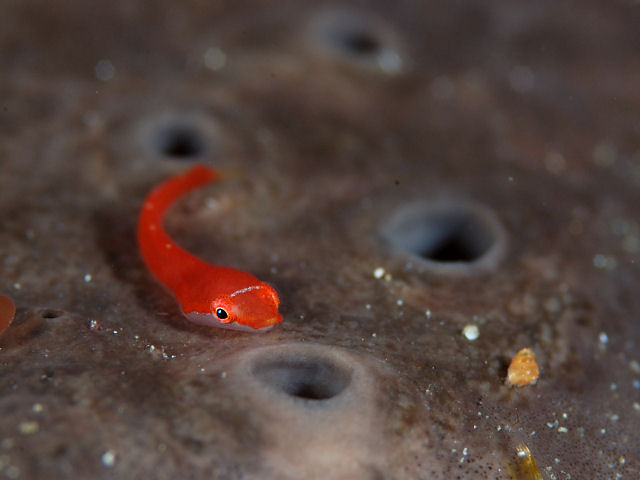

Conservation status
- Least Concern (IUCN 3.1)

Scientific classification
- Kingdom: Animalia
- Phylum: Chordata
- Class: Actinopterygii
- Order: Blenniiformes
- Family: Gobiesocidae
- Genus: Kopua
- Species: K. minima

Binomial name
- Kopua minima (Döderlein, 1887)

Synonyms
- Lepadogaster minimus Döderlein in Steindachner & Döderlein, 1887; Aspasma minima (Döderlein, 1887); Kopua japonica G. I. Moore, Hutchins & Okamoto, 2012

= Kopua minima =

Species of fish

Kopua minima, the Japanese deepwater clingfish, is a clingfish of the family Gobiesocidae, found in the Northwest Pacific, the East China Sea and Japan. This species reaches a length of 3.0 cm (1.2 in). This species was described in 1887 by the German zoologist and paleontologist Ludwig Heinrich Philipp Döderlein from a type collected at a depth of 100-150 fathoms in Sagami Bay, Japan.
