= San Salvo Marina =

Coordinates: 42°04′48″N 14°44′39″E

- Frazione
- Interactive map of San Salvo Marina
- Country: Italy
- Region: Abruzzo
- Province: Chieti
- Time zone: UTC+1 (CET)
  - Summer (DST): UTC+2 (CEST)

San Salvo Marina is a frazione of San Salvo, located in the Province of Chieti - Abruzzo region of Italy.
