= Kopua yoko =

Conservation status
- Least Concern (IUCN 3.1)

Scientific classification
- Kingdom: Animalia
- Phylum: Chordata
- Class: Actinopterygii
- Order: Blenniiformes
- Family: Gobiesocidae
- Genus: Kopua
- Species: K. yoko

Binomial name
- Kopua yoko Fujiwara, Okamoto & Motomura, 2018

Species of fish

Kopua yoko is a clingfish of the family Gobiesocidae.
