= Santa Maria Casanova =

Cistercian Abbey of Santa Maria Casanova
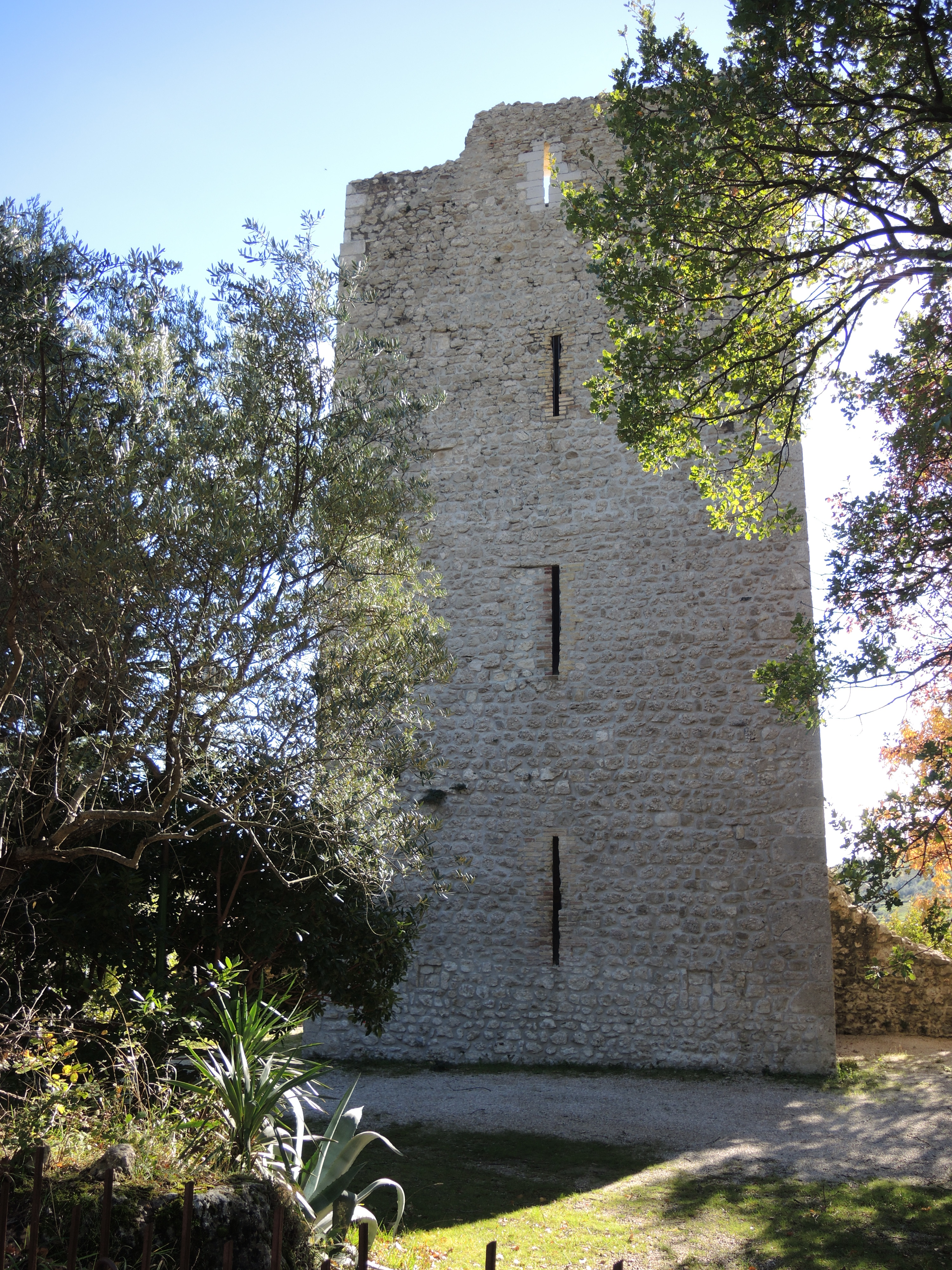

- Location within Italy
- Interactive map of Cistercian Abbey of Santa Maria Casanova

Monastery information
- Order: Cistercian
- Established: 1191
- Disestablished: 1807
- Mother house: Tre Fontane Abbey
- Diocese: Pescara-Penne

Site
- Location: Villa Celiera, Italy
- Coordinates: 42.377951°N 13.867554°E
- Public access: yes

The Abbey of Santa Maria Casanova (Italian: Abbazia di Santa Maria di Casanova) was a Cistercian monastery located in Villa Celiera, Province of Pescara, Italy. Only a lone tower of the abbey now remains.

== History ==
The abbey was founded in 1191 by the mother abbey of Tre Fontane in Rome, which derived from the Benedictine order at Clairvaux. Its construction was completed in 1208 and it was the first Cistercian abbey in Abruzzo.

It had as daughter abbeys the Abbey of St. Mary of Ripalta, Abbey of San Pastore and Santo Spirito d'Ocre. It was ruled by the Cistercians until the suppression of religious orders in the Kingdom of Naples by Joseph Bonaparte in 1807.

== Architecture ==
Nearly all the abbey buildings were razed after suppression. The only part still in place is the tower, recently restored.

== See also ==
- List of Cistercian monasteries
- Abbey of San Pastore

== Bibliography ==
- Mammarella, Luigi (1995). "Santa Maria di Casanova". Abbazie e monasteri cistercensi in Abruzzo (in Italian). Cerchio (AQ): Adelmo Polla Editore. pp. 31–56. ISBN 8874070276.
