= Santo Spirito d'Ocre =

Italian Catholic monastery

Cistercian Abbey of Santo Spirito d'Ocre
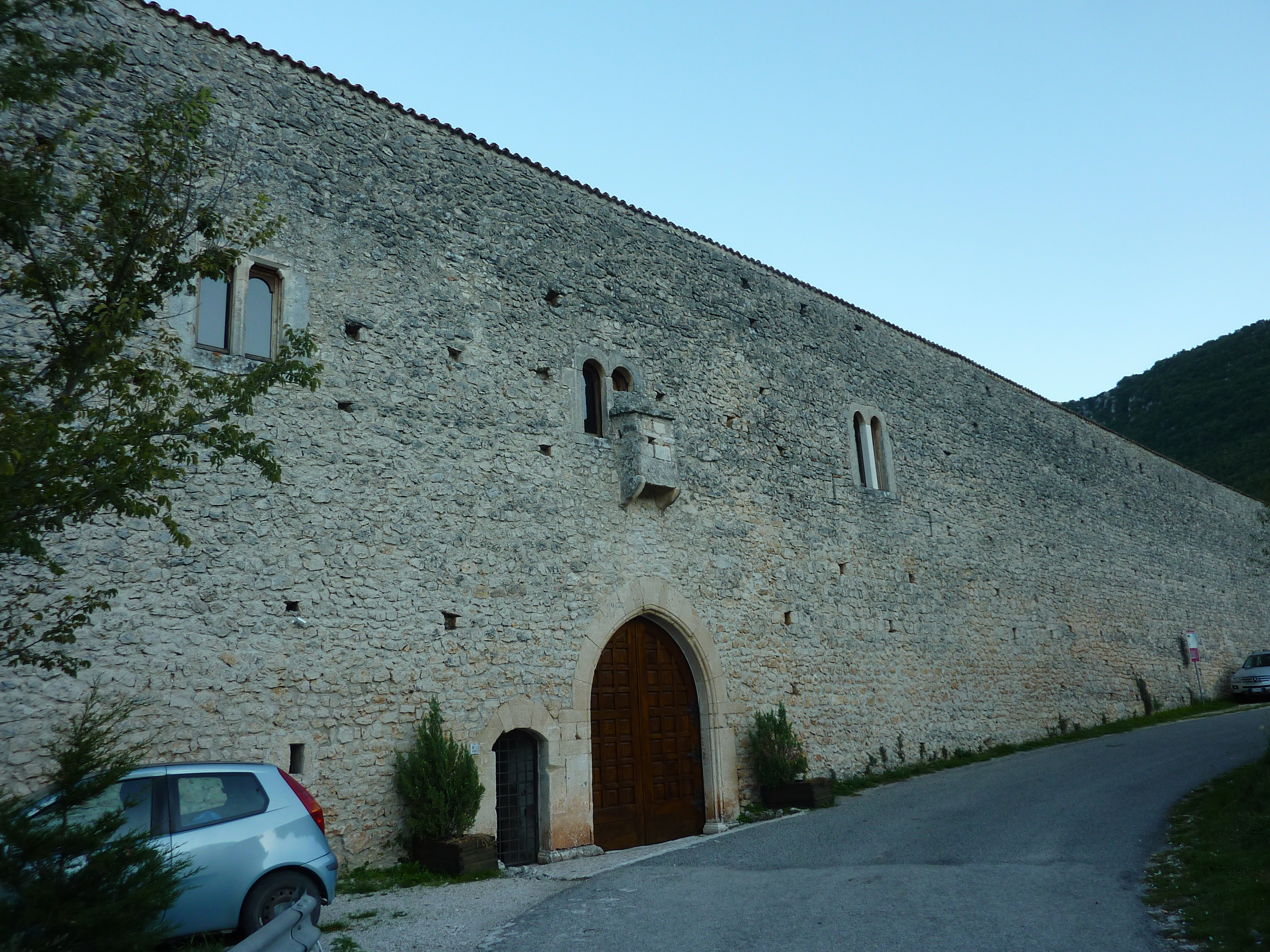

- Location within Italy
- Interactive map of Cistercian Abbey of Santo Spirito d'Ocre

Monastery information
- Order: Cistercian
- Established: 1248
- Disestablished: 1692
- Mother house: Santa Maria Casanova
- Diocese: L'Aquila

Site
- Location: Ocre, Italy
- Coordinates: 42.284288°N 13.494885°E
- Public access: yes

The Abbey of Santo Spirito d'Ocre (Italian: Monastero di Santo Spirito d'Ocre) was a Cistercian monastery located in Ocre, Province of L'Aquila, Italy.

== History ==
The fortified monastery was built in 1226 on an ancient religious building, existing since 1222. In 1248 Santo Spirito became a Cistercian abbey, founded by the mother abbey of Casanova, line of Clairvaux, and it was ruled by the Cistercians until 1692.

== Architecture ==
The monastery is a fortified building, with walls all around the abbey and a very small number of windows and doors.

Inside the walls, all the usual components of a monastery are still in place, with the church on the north side and the remaining rooms of the abbey in the two buildings on the west and east sides.

== See also ==
- List of Cistercian monasteries

== Bibliography ==
- Mammarella, Luigi (1995). "Santo Spirito d'Ocre". Abbazie e monasteri cistercensi in Abruzzo (in Italian). Cerchio (AQ): Adelmo Polla Editore. p. 101-109. ISBN 8874070276.
- Santangelo, Enrico (2002). "Il monastero di Santo Spirito d'Ocre". Castelli e tesori d'arte della Media Valle dell'Aterno (in Italian). Pescara: Carsa Edizioni. p. 49-56. ISBN 88-501-0051-5.
- Latini, Marialuce (2000). "Il monastero fortificato di Santo Spirito d'Ocre". Guida ai Castelli d'Abruzzo (in Italian). Pescara: Carsa Edizioni. p. 55. ISBN 88-501-0051-5.
