= Orto Botanico del Mediterraneo =

Botanical garden in Italy

Coordinates: 43°32′8.82″N 10°18′51.09″E

The Orto Botanico del Mediterraneo is a botanical garden located on the grounds of the Museo di storia naturale del Mediterraneo at Livorno, Tuscany, Italy. It contains groupings of plants typical to various locations along the Mediterranean Sea, with each group in a specific soil (limestone, serpentine, volcanic, etc.).

== See also ==
- List of botanical gardens in Italy
- Giardino Botanico Mediterraneo (Abruzzo)
