= Ocre =

- Comune
- Comune di Ocre
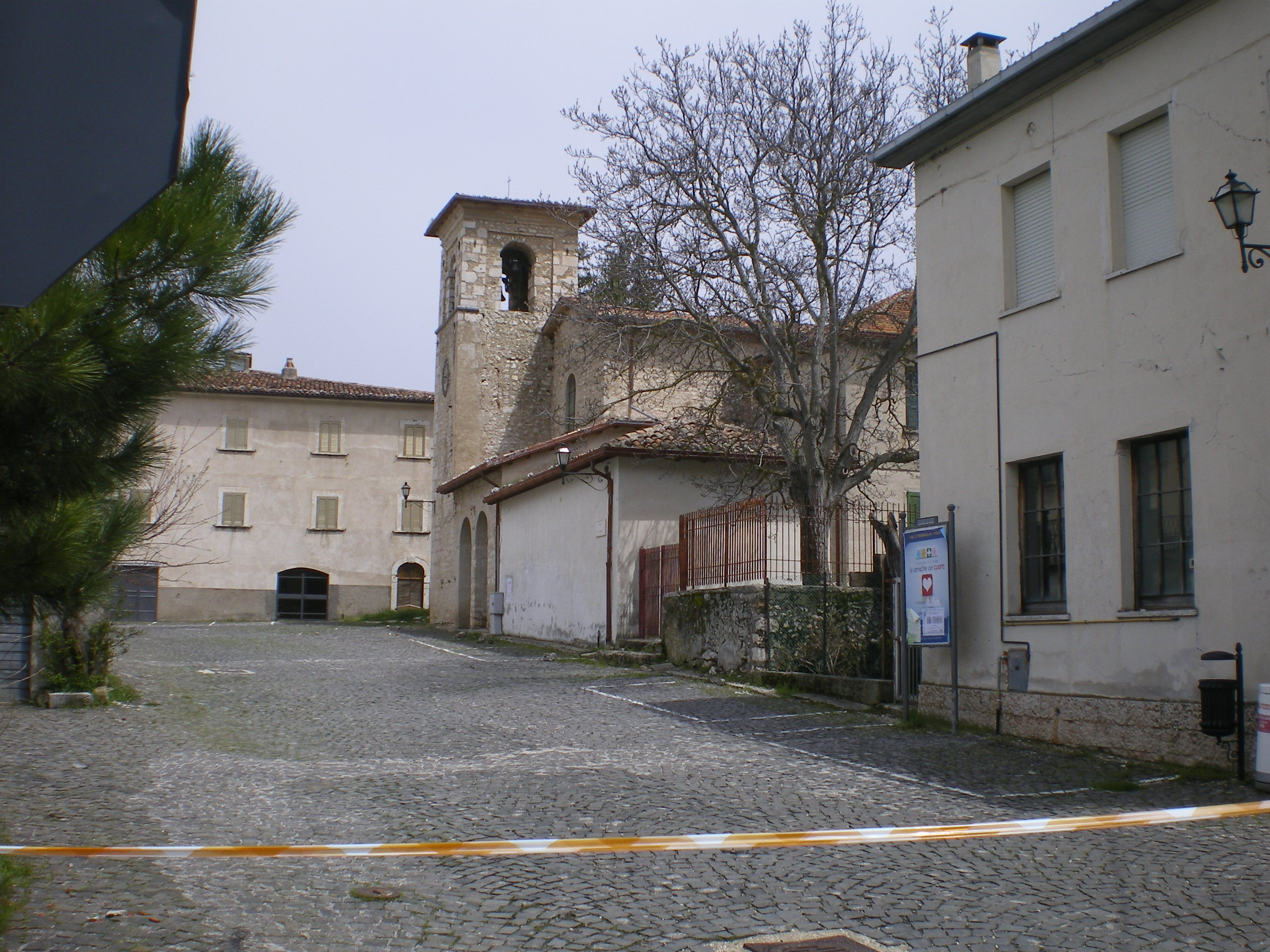

- Location within Italy Location within Abruzzo
- Coordinates: 42°17′13″N 13°28′34″E
- Country: Italy
- Region: Abruzzo
- Province: L'Aquila (AQ)
- Frazioni: Cavalletto, San Felice, San Martino, San Panfilo d'Ocre (sede comunale), Valle

Government
  - Mayor: Fausto Fracassi

Area
  - Total: 23.56 km^{2} (9.10 sq mi)
- Elevation: 850 m (2,790 ft)

Population (31 December 2010)
  - Total: 1,116
  - Density: 47.37/km^{2} (122.7/sq mi)
- Demonym: Ocrensi
- Time zone: UTC+1 (CET)
  - Summer (DST): UTC+2 (CEST)
- Postal code: 67040
- Dialing code: 0862
- Saint day: 28 April
- Website: Official website

Ocre is a comune (municipality) and town in the province of L'Aquila in the Abruzzo region of southern Italy.

== Description and history ==
Its approximate 1,000 inhabitants reside in several small villages scattered across the mid-to–low L’Aquila basin, about 15 km (9.3 mi) southeast of Abruzzo's regional capital. The town hall offices are located in San Panfilo d’Ocre. It belongs to the Amiternina mountain community and part of the territory lies in the Sirente Velino Regional Park.

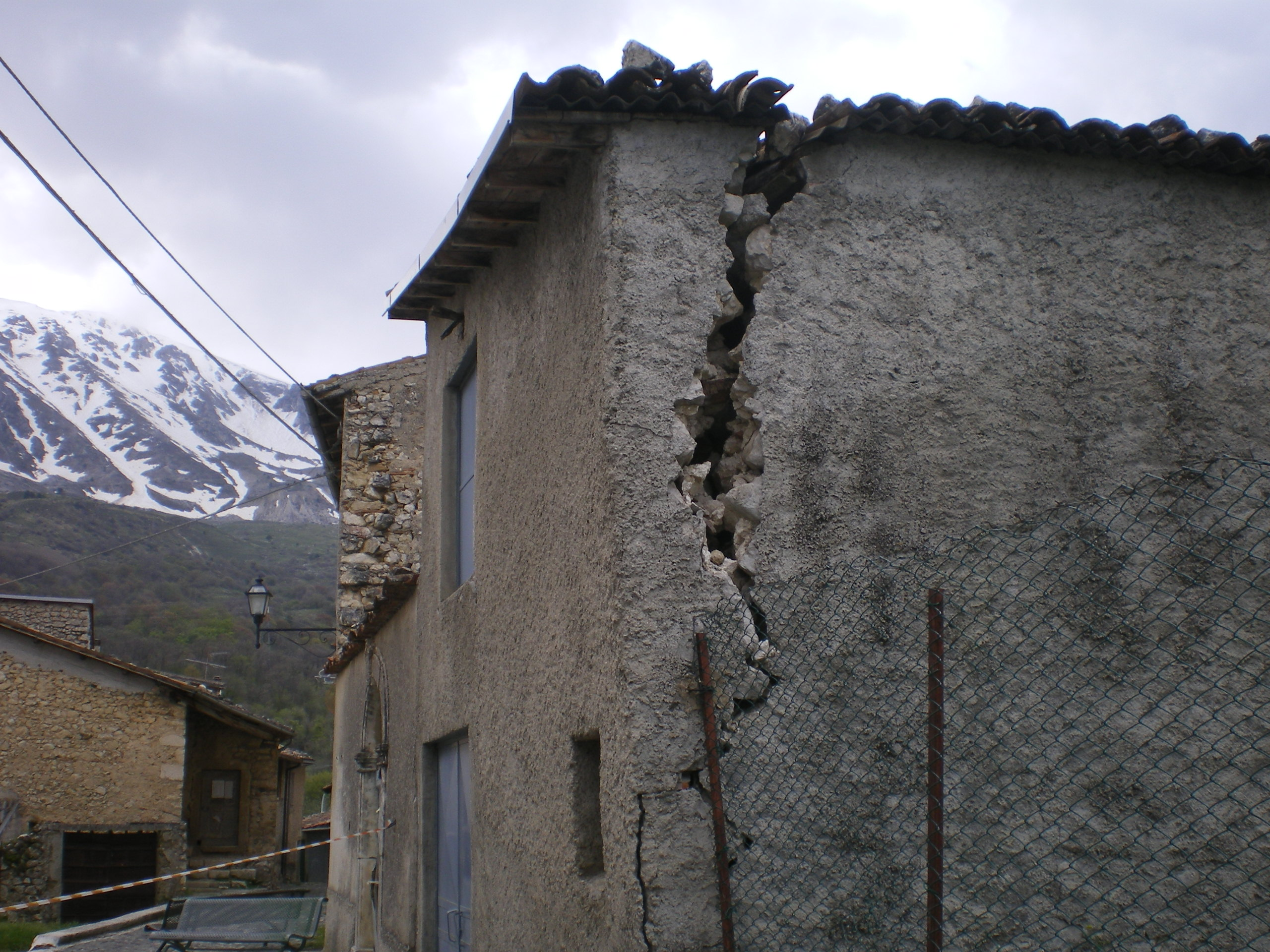
A house damaged by the earthquake of 2009

In the Middle Ages, the fortified village of San Panfilo controlled the lower L'Aquila valley, and the monasteries of the Holy Spirit and Sant Angelo attracted many pilgrims. At that time, the barons of Ocre also controlled the neighboring municipalities.

Ocre's attractions include important historical landmarks as well as festivals like those of baked bread and chestnut.

During the earthquake that hit L'Aquila on April 6, 2009, the town Ocre suffered substantial damage. The old castle of Ocre was almost completely ruined. Several buildings collapsed, and a number of houses in the old town remain uninhabitable.

== Geography ==
The territory of the municipality is dominated by the Mount Ocre–Mount Cagno mountain range (2,204 m (7,231 ft)), with the inhabited part set on its northeastern slopes and crossed by a Regional Road SR5 that rises from L'Aquila to the Rocche Plateau.

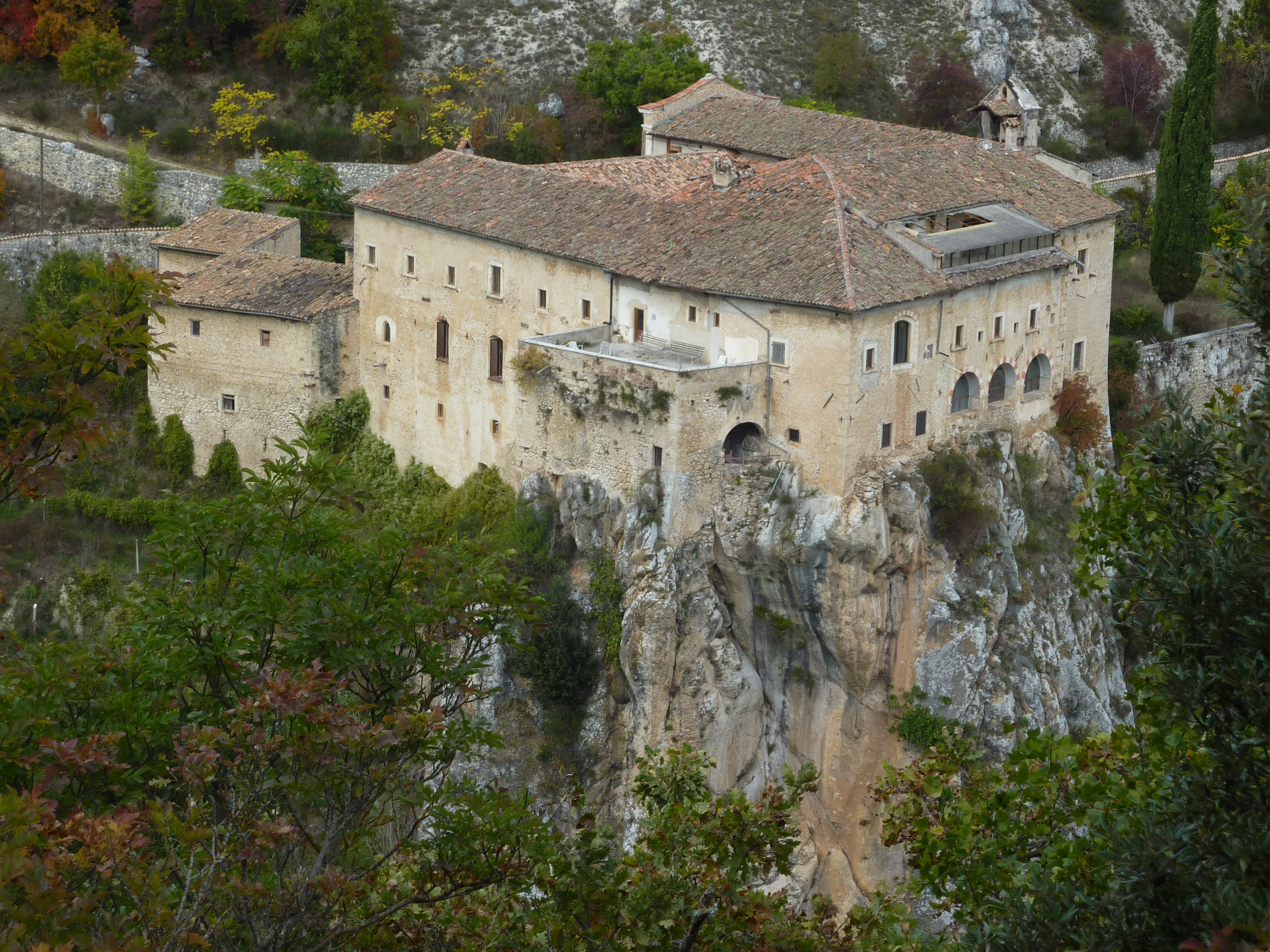
The Monastery of Sant'Angelo

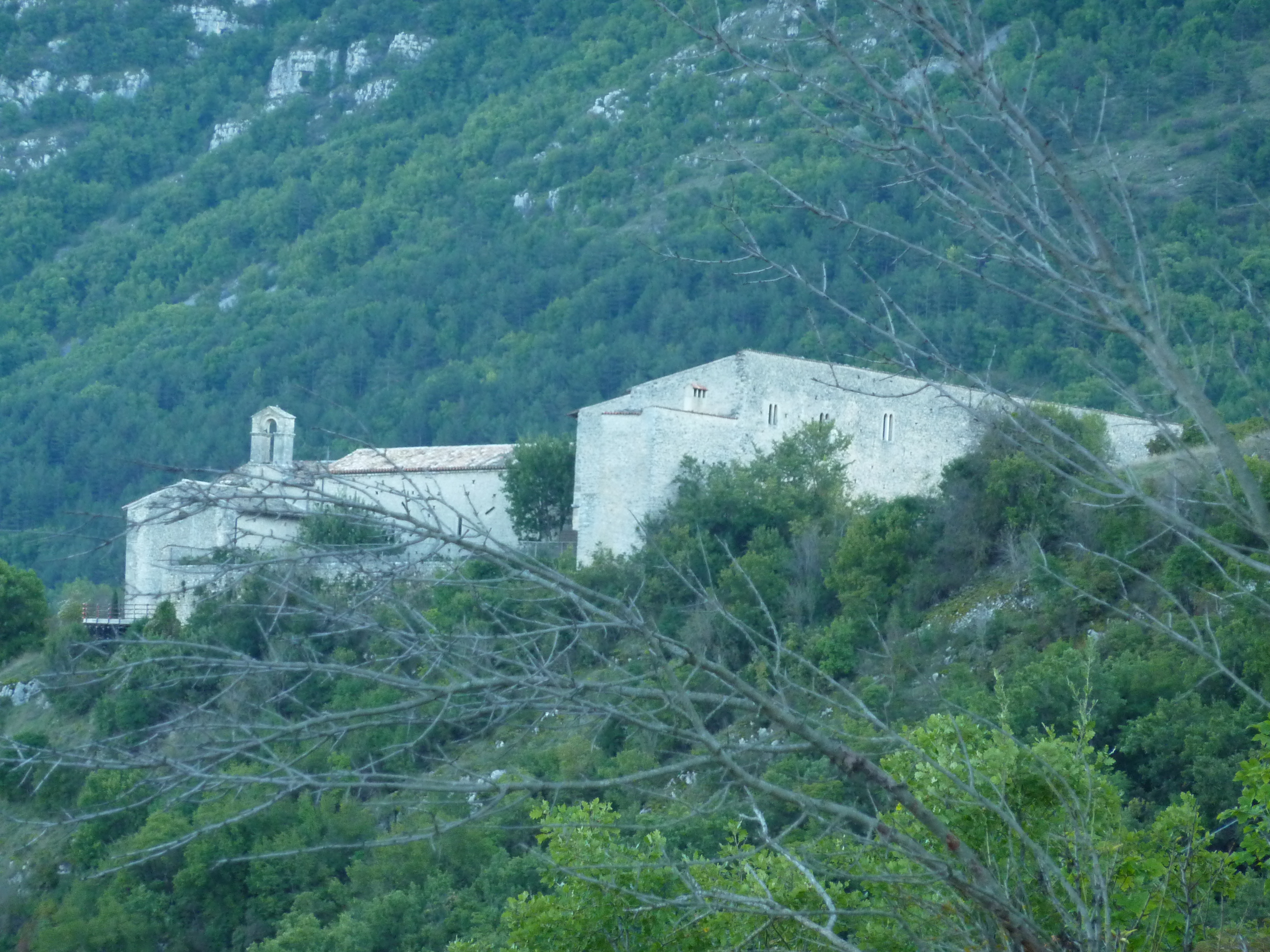
Monastery of the Holy Spirit

== People ==
- Thomas of Ocre, Cardinal, Camerlengo of the Holy Roman Church in 1294, secretary to Celestino V; beatified
- Gualtieri of Ocre, chancellor to the Holy Roman Emperor Frederick II of Hohenstaufen and his son Conrad IV
- Francesco Gualtieri of San Martino D'Ocre (1863–1943), Brigadier General, Commander, Livorno Brigade 1918
