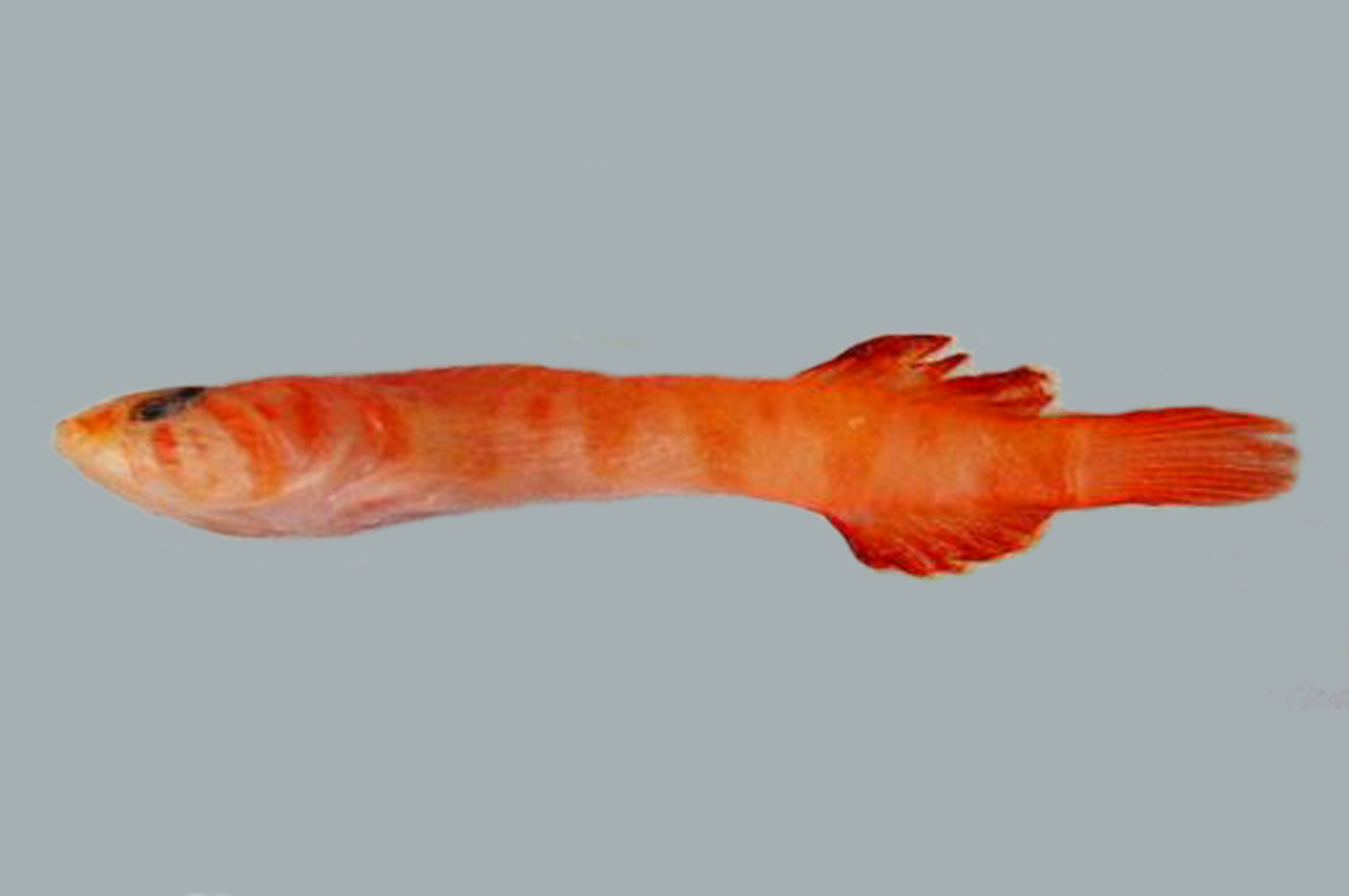
- A Deepwater Clingfish, Kopua kuiteri, found in an empty shell trawled off Bermagui, New South Wales - depth 305-311 m

Scientific classification
- Kingdom: Animalia
- Phylum: Chordata
- Class: Actinopterygii
- Order: Blenniiformes
- Family: Gobiesocidae
- Subfamily: Protogobiesocinae
- Genus: Kopua; Hardy, 1984

Type species
- Kopua nuimata Hardy 1984

= Kopua =

Genus of fishes

Kopua is a genus of clingfishes found in the Pacific Ocean.

Kopua are a genus of clingfishes belonging to the family Gobiesocidae. Fish belonging to this genus are found in the Pacific Ocean, around New Zealand, Australia, and the East China Sea. The genus got its name “Kopua” from the Maori language; the name literally means “deep water”. There are currently five known species of the genus: Kopua numinata is found in the northern waters of New Zealand, Kopua kuiteri is found in southern Australian waters, Kopua minima and Kopua yoko are found in the East China Sea, Kopua vermiculata is found in the Sagami-nada Sea. The presence of Kopua in the Northern Hemisphere shows evidence of anti tropicality of fish within the family Gobiesocidae. All species are found in waters deeper than 90 m (300 ft), ranging from 90–408 m (300–1,340 ft) in depth. The genus was discovered through a trawling net of the ocean floor. Not much is known about the genus’ habitat, except for the depth that the fish generally seem to reside, or the diet and behavior of the fish.

== Description ==
Similar to other clingfishes, Kopua have small bodies with maximum lengths of 7 cm (2.8 in). There is no observable sexual dimorphism in the recognized species. All clingfish species have naked skin (scaleless), single dorsal and anal fins, a depressed head, as well as a pair of fin girdles that form the ventral sucking disk. Fish that are part of the genus Kopua can be identified by specific shared characteristics, although each species does have varying measurements of each characteristic. It is possible to distinguish species within the genus from each other by looking at the pore patterns and numbering and patterns of the anal and dorsal fins. Fish within this genus have a slender body with a slender, depressed head and a short rounded snout, tubular nostrils on each side of the head that are free of a dermal flap and large eyes with narrow bony interorbit. They have a united gill membrane (no isthmus) fused opposite of the fourth pectoral ray, four gill arches with rakers and filaments; rakers are short and pointed. They have a pore system, but it is only on the head of the fish. The mouth is marginally inferior with a broad upper lip that barely narrows at the sides; there are two layers of teeth on the upper and lower jaw with the outermost layer teeth being flattened and rounded, the innermost layer are smaller, curved, and pointed, and the irregularly sized teeth along the side of the jaw. Their dorsal and anal fins are moderately long and free from the caudal fin; they do not overlap the caudal fin base. The double pelvic disc is striated with a square posterior fringe. Kopua do not have a fleshy pectoral pad, and have a depressed posterior. Most species have an orangey-reddish pigmentation, but that is in death. The actual pigmentation of live fish is currently unknown.

== Species ==
There are currently 5 recognized species in this genus, although Fishbase currently only recognises 4:

- Kopua kuiteri Hutchins, 1991
- Kopua minima (Döderlein, 1887)
- Kopua nuimata Hardy, 1984
- Kopua vermiculata Shinohara & Katayama, 2015 (Twilight clingfish)
- Kopua yoko Fujiwara, Okamoto & Motomura, 2018

Synonyms

- Kopua japonica G. I. Moore, Hutchins & Okamoto, 2012 (Japanese deepwater clingfish); valid as K. minima
