= Villa Celiera =

- Comune
- Comune di Villa Celiera
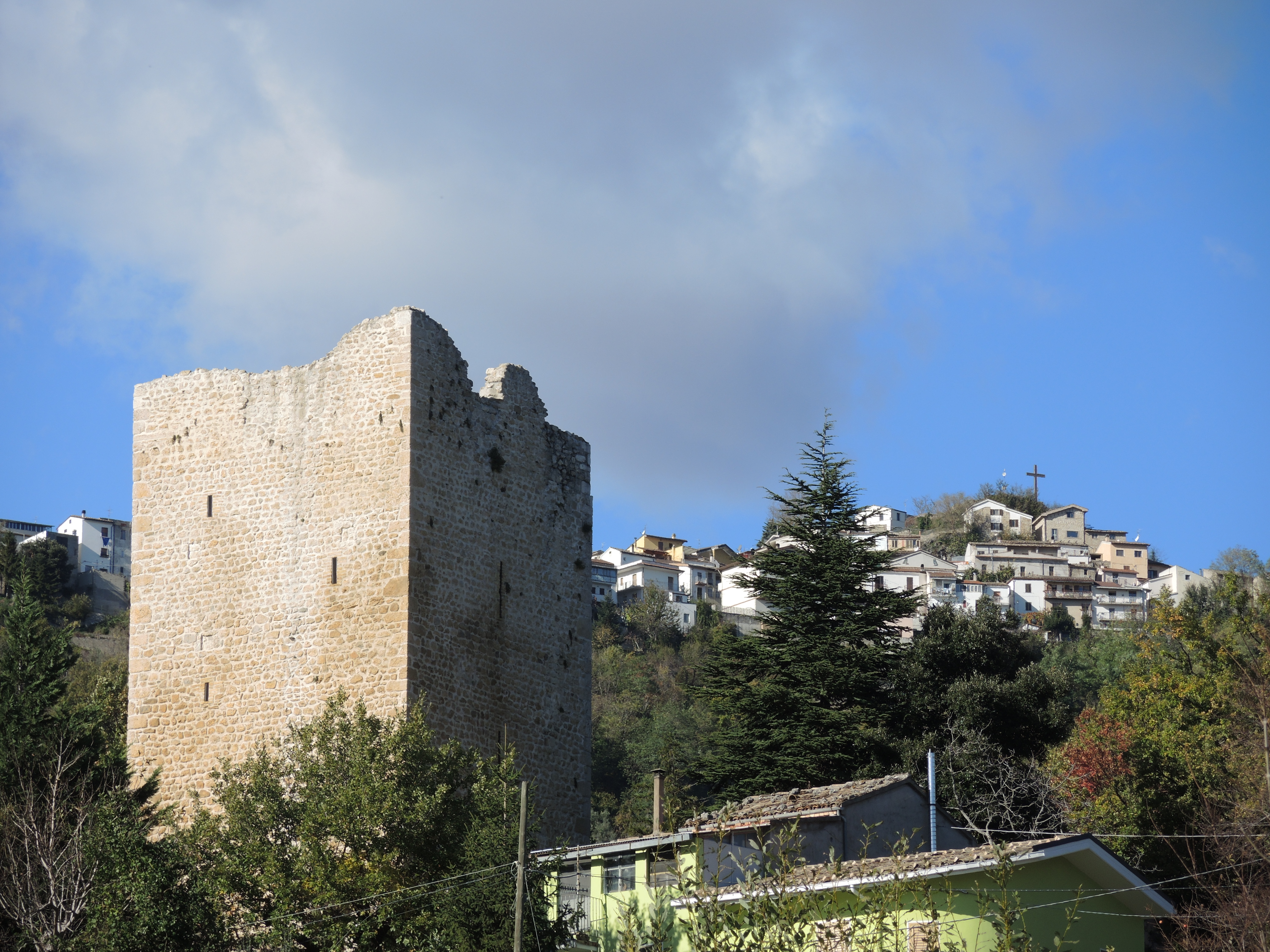
- View of Villa Celiera

- Coat of arms

- Location within Italy Location within Abruzzo
- Coordinates: 42°23′N 13°51′E
- Country: Italy
- Region: Abruzzo
- Province: Pescara (PE)
- Frazioni: Casanova, Fosso Secco, Pietrarossa, San Sebastiano Traino, Santa Maria, Vagnola

Government
  - Mayor: Domenico Vespa

Area
  - Total: 12.57 km^{2} (4.85 sq mi)
- Elevation: 714 m (2,343 ft)

Population (28 February 2010)
  - Total: 770
  - Density: 61/km^{2} (160/sq mi)
- Demonym: Cellarotti or Celiaroti
- Time zone: UTC+1 (CET)
  - Summer (DST): UTC+2 (CEST)
- Postal code: 65010
- Dialing code: 085
- Patron saint: St. John the Baptist
- Website: Official website

Villa Celiera is a comune and town in the province of Pescara in the Abruzzo region of Italy. It is located in the Gran Sasso e Monti della Laga National Park. The economy is based on agriculture (potatoes, cereals) and animal husbandry. The town mayor is Domenico Vespa. The town is famous for having created arrosticini, a lamb kebab that has become a favorite throughout Italy, and has several local Michelin guide listed restaurants.

The town borders the Abruzzo National Park.

A few expatriates return from other countries in the summer - mainly South Africans. The main ethnic groups are Italian with minor Romanian immigrants that have come within the 2000-2013 era. The natives speak a local dialect called Cellarotto.

Winter attractions include skiing, snow shoeing and sledding. Summer attractions include hiking, climbing, horse riding, mountain biking, mushroom finding and hunting.

WORLD WAR TWO

The town is famous for its famous resistance against partisan soldiers after Mussolini was captured an hour away in Campo Imperatore. The town has always had a strong discipline of woodsman training regime, called the Alpine Guard, that was used by the Kingdom of Italy as shock troops in multiple wars including the Italian conquest of Libya and the first and second wars of Ethiopia.

At 6:00 A. M., of October 30, 1944, 5,000 communist partisans ascended into the town from the nearby town of Vestea to subdue local pro-fascist movements. The ragtag group of fascists, outnumbered 3 to 1, led by the now deceased Amadeo Inzaghi, fought the communist on the Mount of Bertona. The fascists troops defeated the disorganized partisans. Although, the skirmish was insignificant in the history books and reported only by local pro fascist newspapers, the inhabitants of the town still retain the sense of pride from the battle.
