= Frans Harjawiyata =

Indonesian abbot

Fransiskus "Frans" Harjawiyata O.C.S.O. (September 24, 1931 – June 7, 2016) was an Indonesian Roman Catholic monastic abbot and member of the Order of Cistercians of the Strict Observance, who are more commonly known as the Trappists. Harjawiyata, who was the first Indonesian-born Trappist abbot in the country's history, headed the St. Mary's of Rawaseneng Monastery (Pertapaan Santa Maria Rawaseneng) in Temanggung Regency, Central Java province, from 1978 to 2006. Harjawiyata is credited with helping to develop Christianity in Indonesia by translating Catholic scriptures and chants into Indonesian. He translated the Breviary from Latin into Indonesian, authored several books on spirituality, and composed several Indonesian-language Gregorian chants. His chants are still performed in Catholic churches throughout Indonesia today.

He was born in Yogyakarta on September 24, 1931. He entered the Trappist order on July 26, 1951, and completed his novitiate, or monastic training, in Tilburg, the Netherlands. He then studied Catholic theology and philosophy in Italy.

Harjawiyata returned to Indonesia in October 1960, where he joined the St. Mary's Monastery in Rawaseneng, Temanggung Regency, on Java, on October 2, 1960. St. Mary's Monastery had been founded in 1953 by a Dutch priest, Dom Bavo van der Ham, with help from the Apostolic Vicars of Batavia, Monsignor Antonio van Velsen S.J., a Jesuit. The new monastery was twinned with Koningshoeven Abbey, a Trappist monastery in Berkel-Enschot, North Brabant, the Netherlands.

In 1958, St. Mary's of Rawaseneng was elevated to a priory in 1958. It then became a fully independent abbey in 1978.

On May 4, 1978, the same year that St. Mary's became an abbey, Frans Harjawiyata was installed as its first abbot by Cardinal Justinus Darmojuwono, becoming the first Indonesian-born Catholic abbot in Indonesia's history. He served as the abbot of St. Mary's from 1978 until 2006. In 1979, Harjawiyata sent several of monks to study at the Trappist monastery in Vitorchiano, Italy. Eleven Indonesian monks had studied in Italy by 1985. Father Harjawiyata also founded a Catholic convent for nuns near Mount Merbabu in the city of Salatiga, Central Java. He retired as the monastery's abbot October 1, 2006.

Following his retirement as abbot, Harjawiyata went on sabbatical at Tenshien Monastery in Japan. He then served as the chaplain of Tenshien Monastery for nine years. In April 2016, Father Harjawiyata returned to St. Mary's of Rawaseneng Monastery.

Father Frans Harjawiyata died in Parakan, Central Java, Indonesia, on June 7, 2016, at the age of 85. St. Mary's of Rawaseneng Monastery has grown into a community of 35 Trappist monks, as of 2016.
