= Southern Star Abbey =

Cistercian monastery in the North Island, New Zealand

The Southern Star Abbey
- Interactive map of The Southern Star Abbey

Monastery information
- Other name: Kopua
- Order: Order of Cistercians of the Strict Observance (OCSO)
- Established: 1954
- Mother house: Mount Melleray Abbey, Cappoquin, Waterford, Ireland
- Dedication: The Blessed Virgin Mary

Site
- Location: On the boundary of Tararua and the Central Hawkes Bay Districts, New Zealand
- Coordinates: 40°04′31.3″S 176°16′29.7″E

The Southern Star Abbey, (Our Lady of the Southern Star Abbey (Kopua) or Kopua Monastery) is a Cistercian monastery located in a remote, rural area of the North Island, New Zealand in the Diocese of Palmerston North. The monastery supports itself by operating a dairy farm. It is located at Kopua, between Takapau and Norsewood.

== History ==
=== Prescott land ===
In 1948 a farming couple at Kopua, Thomas and Rosalie Prescott, decided to give their farm of 360 hectares (890 acres) to the Catholic Church with the long-term idea of an agricultural college being established on it. Their only condition was that in some way a life-interest be reserved for Rosalie, and a home provided for their adopted intellectually handicapped son, John. It was a fine, productive property, ready made for monks who lived off land they cultivated, while they centered their contemplative lives on the full observance of the seven periods of formal liturgical prayer that punctuated each day.

=== Finding monks ===
At that time, Kopua was within the boundaries of the Archdiocese of Wellington. Archbishop McKeefry approached the Abbey of Our Lady of Gethsemani in Kentucky to establish a monastery, thinking that they might be interested because one of their monks Thomas Merton was the son of a New Zealander, Owen Merton. He also approached Koningshoeven Abbey in Berkel-Enschot, the Netherlands. Neither abbey expressed interest. But eventually Mount Melleray Abbey in County Waterford in Ireland agreed to the foundation.

=== Foundation ===
On 9 June 1954, six monks from Mount Melleray arrived in Kopua. The pioneers lived in the shearers' quarters on the property while they built their first dwelling and began working part of the farm. In 1955 more monks arrived and the temporary monastery began to take shape. Wooden buildings were transferred from the former Pahiatua Polish camp to provide kitchen, dining room and library. These buildings, intended to be temporary, still serve their purpose today. A Wellington lawyer, Thaddeus McCarthy, began drafting the complicated contract providing for the transfer of ownership of the Prescott farm to the Cistercians. More monks gradually arrived from Ireland between 1958 and 1969.

=== Threatened withdrawal ===
Even though he had approved of this arrangement while on a preliminary visit, back in Ireland the Mt Melleray abbot was having second thoughts and threatened to withdraw his men. He had come to think the initial transfer of land was inadequate; at least 120 hectares were necessary to sustain a self-sufficient community of 20 or more monks. "The ownership of a sufficient amount of land is the foundation rock of a Cistercian foundation. Take away our land and we cease to exist as Cistercians". Worried lest he lose the Trappists as he had lost the Carmelites who he had tried to establish in his archdiocese before, McKeefry consulted the Sydney Apostolic Delegate, Archbishop Romolo Carboni, who intervened to smooth over the misunderstanding. It had been due to differing appreciations of land areas, land titles and New Zealand tax law relating to gifts; the deed of transfer was more than adequate security.

=== Life of the community ===
From its inception the monastery attracted a great deal of Catholic interest and some vocations. By 15 September 1959 it was considered sufficiently stable for the connection with Mt Melleray to be ended, and the General Chapter of the Order raised Kopua to the status of an abbey. The monastery was constituted as the Abbey of Our Lady of the Southern Star. On 9 April 1960 Fr. Joachim (later Joseph) Murphy was elected to the office of Abbot and he was formally installed in a ceremony conducted by McKeefry in August 1960. Murphy continued as Abbot until 1986. During these years the changes in the Catholic Church made by the Vatican Council II made an impact. Renewal was required of the community. Monks were offered the opportunity for higher studies in Rome, Latin gradually gave way to English in the Liturgy and the emphasis placed on fraternal life in community led to significant changes in lifestyle. During the late 1960s and into the 1970s, Murphy and his team of priests quietly helped Bishop Owen Snedden (then McKeefry's assistant) with the painstaking work of criticising and commenting on draft English translations of various liturgical books as the church changed gear from the universal use of Latin. Thomas Prescott died in 1962 and, in 1972, at the urgings of his widow so as to put into partial effect the couple's hope for the establishment of an agricultural college, a farm cadet scheme began. The family homestead accommodated up to six young men who received basic farm training from the monks before going on to an agricultural college. This institute closed in 1980. In 1979 a community of 30 celebrated its silver jubilee with the temporary buildings becoming permanent. Rosalie Prescott continued to live with her son, John, on the property until her death on 17 July 2003, four days short of her 104th birthday, and John Prescott then joined the community. From its foundation the monastery has provided for itself, carried out its charitable works and fulfilled its obligations of hospitality through the Guest House from mixed farming: dairying, beef, sheep, pigs and potatoes. Other subsidiary enterprises have been: cropping, the grafting of root stock for orchardists, growing carrots (for the Rabbit Board), strawberry plants and orchids. By the year 2000, dairying and beef production were the main farming activities.

=== Current status ===
The monastery has a lay community for persons able to commit for a time to lead a community life that overlaps with the monastery. The members of the lay community are called "Companions of the Abbey". They are Christians, married or single, who reside at the abbey and live out the monastery's spirituality as fully as possible whilst remaining members of the laity. This vocation is normally temporary with a minimum period of three months.
