= Y. B. Mangunwijaya =

Indonesian architect, writer, Catholic priest

Yusuf Bilyarta Mangunwijaya Dipl.Ing.
- Fr Mangun
- Church: Catholic Church
- Archdiocese: Semarang

Orders
- Ordination: 8 September 1959 by Albertus Soegijapranata, S.J.

Personal details
- Born: 6 May 1929 Ambarawa, Dutch East Indies
- Died: 10 February 1999 (aged 69) Carolus Hospital, Paseban, Senen, Central Jakarta
- Buried: St Paul Major Seminary Kentungan, Condong Catur, Sleman
- Parents: Serafin Kamdaniyah (mother); Yulianus Sumadi Mangunwijaya (father)
- Occupation: Architect; Writer; Catholic priest
- Education: St Albertus High School Malang; Peter Canisius Minor Seminary Mertoyudan; Bandung Institute of Technology; RWTH Aachen University; Aspen Institute of Humanistic Studies

Yusuf Bilyarta Mangunwijaya (Ambarawa, Central Java, 6 May 1929 – Carolus Hospital, Paseban, Senen, Central Jakarta, 10 February 1999), was an Indonesian architect, writer, and Catholic priest. He was popularly known as Romo Mangun (Father Mangun).

== Biography ==
Romo Mangun was the son of Yulianus Sumadi Mangunwijaya and Serafin Kamdaniyah. At the age of sixteen, he joined the People's Security Army during the Indonesian National Revolution and was shocked by the way the troops treated the villagers. In 1950, upon hearing a speech about the harmful effects of the revolution on civilians by one of the commanders, Major Isman, he decided to serve as a priest. He was ordained in 1959, while studying philosophy and theology at the "Institut Sancti Pauli" in Yogyakarta. He continued to study architecture in Aachen, Germany, and at the Aspen Institute of Humanistic Studies in Aspen, Colorado.

He was the author of many novels, short stories, essays and non-fiction works. He produced many anthology of novels such as Ikan-ikan Hiu, Ido, Homa (The Sharks, Ido, Homa), Roro Mendut, Durga/Umayi, Burung-Burung Manyar (The Weaverbirds), and his essays were published in various newspapers in Indonesia. His work, Sastra dan Religiositas (Literature and Religiosity) was awarded as the best non-fiction book in 1982, while his novel The Weaverbirds received the Ramon Magsaysay Award in 1996.

His disappointment with the Indonesian educational system triggered him to explore alternative systems that led to the establishment of the Foundation for Elementary Education Dynamics in 1987. He had also set up an explorative elementary school for the community that was displaced by the development of the Kedung Ombo reservoir in Central Java, as well as the poor in the Code River, Yogyakarta.

Romo Mangun was known as the father of modern Indonesian architecture. In 1992, he received the Aga Khan Award for Architecture for his work on the slum dwellers by the riverbank Code in Yogyakarta. He also received The Ruth and Ralph Erskine Fellowship in 1995, as recognition of his dedication to the less privileged. His work on the houses of the poor along the banks of the Code River contributed towards Mangunwijaya becoming one of Indonesia's most renowned architects. According to Erwinthon P. Napitupulu, the author of a book on Mangunwijaya, due to be published at the end of 2011, Mangun heads the list of the top 10 Indonesian architects.

Romo Mangun's dedication to helping those who were poor, oppressed and marginalised by politics through an "outcry of the voice of conscience" made him a strong opponent of the Soeharto regime.

== Awards ==
- Golden Windmill Award for fiction/literary works from Radio Nederland
- Aga Khan Award for Architecture 1992 for Kali Code, Yogyakarta
- Indonesian Institute of Architects Award 1991 for Marian Shrine in Sendangsono
- Ramon Magsaysay Award 1996

== Architectural projects ==
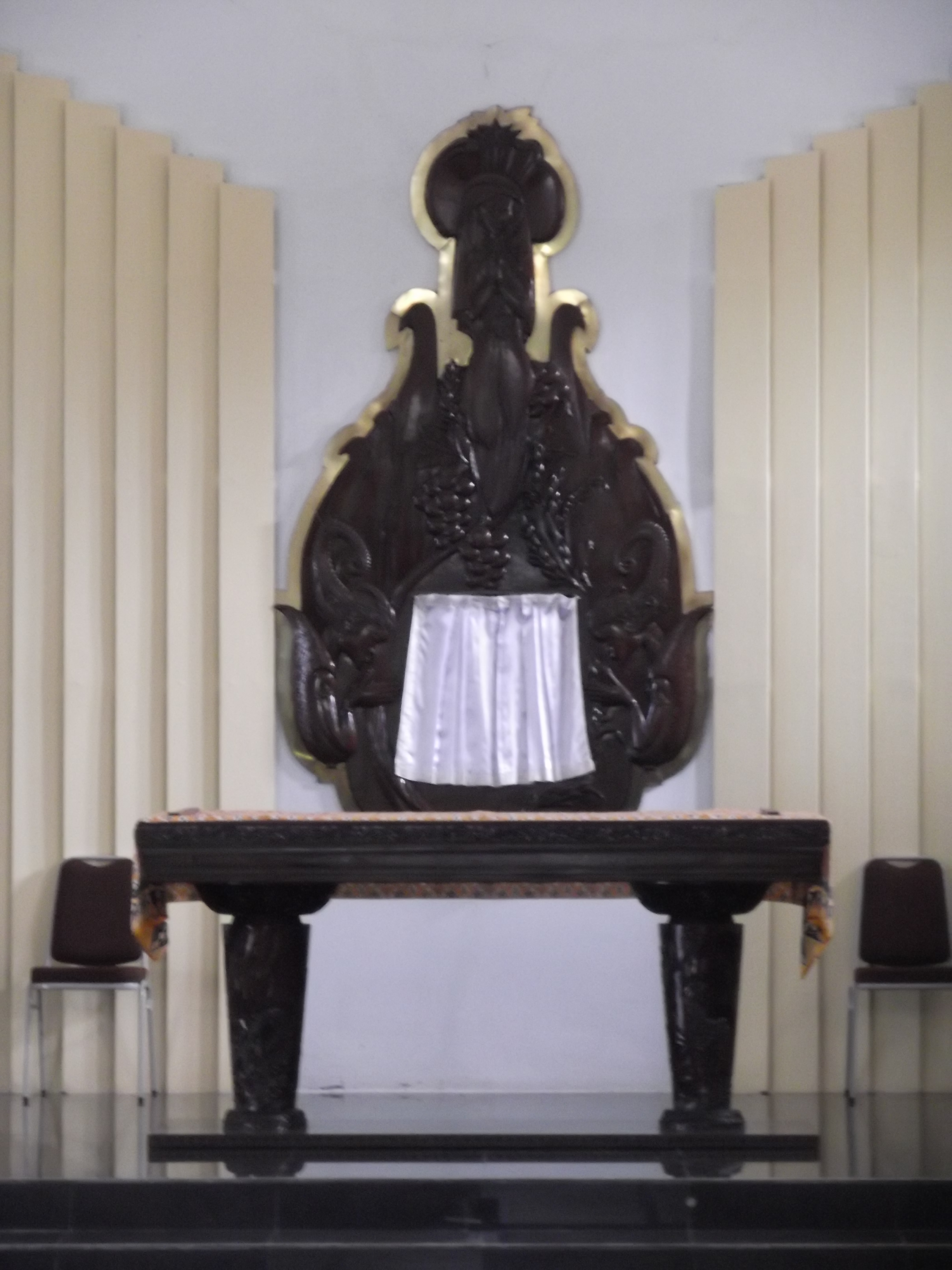
Church altar and tabernacle of Rawaseneng Monastery}. A wood carving work designed by Y.B. Mangunwijaya surrounds the tabernacle; Our Lady clasping hands depicted at the top.

- Kali Code Urban Settlement, Yogyakarta : Aga Khan Award 1992
- Sendangsono (Marian shrine)
- Semarang Apostolic Building
- Gedung Bentara Budaya, Jakarta
- Gereja Katolik Jetis, Yogyakarta
- Gereja Katolik Cilincing, Jakarta
- Markas Kowihan II
- Kampus II Universitas Surabaya
- Gereja Katolik Santa Maria Assumpta, Klaten- Jateng
- Pertapaan Bunda Pemersatu Gedono

== Publications ==
=== Novels ===
- Romo Rahadi (1981, published under a pen name of Y. Wastu Wijaya)
- Burung-Burung Manyar (1981)
- Ikan-Ikan Hiu, Ido, Homa (1983)
- Balada Becak (1985)
- Durga Umayi (1985)
- Burung-Burung Rantau (1992)
- Balada Dara-Dara Mendut (1993)
- Pohon-Pohon Sesawi (1999)
- Rara Mendut, Genduk Duku, Lusi Lindri (2008, originally published as a trilogy in Kompas daily newspaper during 1982-1987)

=== Novels translated into English ===
- The Weaverbirds, translated by Thomas M. Hunter; John H. McGlynn, editor. Lontar Foundation, 1991. 316 p.
- Durga/Umayi, translated by Ward Keeler. University of Washington Press; Singapore : Singapore University Press, c2004. 212 p. ISBN 0-295-98392-2

=== Anthologies of essays and short stories ===
- Sastra dan Religiositas (1982, Essays)
- Esei-Esei Orang Republik (1987, Essays)
- Tumbal: Kumpulan Tulisan Tentang Kebudayaan, Perikemanusiaan dan Kemasyarakatan (1994)
- Rumah Bambu (2000, Short stories)

=== Others ===
- Spiritualitas Baru
- Politik Hati Nurani
- Puntung-Puntung Roro Mendut (1978)
- Fisika Bangunan (1980)
- Pemasyarakatan Susastra Dipandang Dari Sudut Budaya (1986)
- Putri Duyung Yang Mendamba: Renungan Filsafat Hidup Manusia Modern Ragawidya (1986)
- Di Bawah Bayang-Bayang Adikuasa (1987)
- Wastu Citra, Buku Arsitektur (1988)
- Menuju Indonesia Serba Baru (1998)
- Menuju Republik Indonesia Serikat (1998)
- Gerundelan Orang Republik (1995)
- Gereja Diaspora (1999)
- Memuliakan Allah, Mengangkat Manusia (1999)
- Manusia Pascamodern, Semesta, dan Tuhan: Renungan Filsafat Hidup, Manusia Modern (1999)
- Tentara dan Kaum Bersenjata (1999)
- Menjadi Generasi Pasca-Indonesia: Kegelisahan Y.B. Mangunwijaya (1999)
- Merintis RI Yang Manusiawi: Republik Yang Adil dan Beradab (1999)
- Pasca-Indonesia, Pasca-Einstein (1999)
- Saya Ingin Membayar Utang Kepada Rakyat (1999)
- Kita Lebih Bodoh dari Generasi Soekarno-Hatta (2000)
- Soeharto Dalam Cerpen Indonesia (2001)
- Impian Dari Yogyakarta, (2003)

== Literatures on Romo Mangun ==
- Sumartana, et al. Mendidik Manusia Merdeka Romo Y.B. Mangunwijaya 65 Tahun. Institut Dian/Interfedei dan Pustaka Pelajar, 1995. ISBN 979-8726-01-4.
- Wahid, Abdurrahman. Romo Mangun Di Mata Para Sahabat. Kanisius, 1999. ISBN 979-672-431-6.
- Priyanahadi, et al. Y.B. Mangunwijaya, Pejuang Kemanusiaan. Kanisius, 1999. ISBN 979-672-435-9.
- Prawoto, Eko A. Tektonika Arsitektur Y.B. Mangunwijaya. Cemeti Art House Yogyakarta, 1999.
- Mengenang Y.B. Mangunwijaya, Pergulatan Intelektual dalam Era Kegelisahan. Kanisius, 1999. ISBN 979-672-433-2.
- Sindhunata. Menjadi Generasi Pasca-Indonesia, Kegelisahan Y.B. Mangunwijaya. Kanisius, 1999. ISBN 979-672-432-4.
- Purwatma. Romo Mangun Imam bagi Kaum Kecil. Kanisius, 2001. ISBN 979-672-959-8.
- Rahmanto, B. Y.B. Mangunwijaya: Karya dan Dunianya. Grasindo, 2001. ISBN 978-979-96526-1-4.
- Yahya, Iip D. and Shakuntala, I.B. Romo Mangun Sahabat Kaum Duafa. Kanisius, 2005. ISBN 978-979-21-0563-6.
