= Bunda Pemersatu Monastery =

Pertapaan Gedono
- Interactive map of Pertapaan Gedono

Monastery information
- Full name: Pertapaan Bunda Pemersatu Gedono
- Order: Trappists (OCSO)
- Established: 12 April 1987
- Mother house: Rawaseneng Monastery
- Dedication: Our Lady of Unity
- Diocese: Archdiocese of Semarang

People
- Founders: Dom Frans Harjawiyata, OCSO
- Abbot: Abbess Martha Elisabeth Driscoll, OCSO
- Important associated figures: Abbess Cristiana Piccardo, OCSO; Fr. Suitbertus Ari Sunardi, OCSO

Architecture
- Architect: Fr. Y. B. Mangunwijaya

Site
- Location: Weru, Jetak Village, Getasan, Semarang, Central Java
- Country: Indonesia
- Coordinates: 7°24′19″S 110°28′12″E
- Public access: Yes, outside cloistered area

Bunda Pemersatu Monastery (Indonesian: Pertapaan Bunda Pemersatu, Pertapaan Bunda Pemersatu Gedono) is a Trappistine monastery located in Semarang Regency, Central Java, Indonesia. The monastery was officially established on the Palm Sunday in 12 April 1987 as a daughter house of Rawaseneng Monastery in Temanggung Regency. Its architecture was one of the works of Fr. Y. B. Mangunwijaya, and in 1993 was awarded the National IAI Award from the Indonesian Institute of Architects (IAI).

Like any nuns or monks in other Trappist monasteries, the nuns of Gedono lives on prayer and works of their hands under the Rule of Saint Benedict. Their manual works include managing vegetable plantations and household works, as well producing hosts, jams, syrups, cakes, kefirs, and religious cards, which enable them to feed themselves from the selling results.

In the 25th anniversary of Gedono Monastery on 12 May 2012, which was also attended by Frans Seda's family, Cardinal Julius Darmaatmadja, SJ said: "Seven times a day, the nuns of Gedono praise, search for His mystery, admire, beg for mercy, pray for all: the whole world, the whole Church. The nuns live in the silence of the heart and mind, however brief, to be able to understand the Lord's will. The nuns live in love, praise, in simplicity and works. All of those are dedicated to the Lord. Thank you nuns, proficiat, thank you."

== Superiors ==
Superiors of the community since the official establishment in 1987:

- 1987 – 1994 : Martha Elisabeth Driscoll, OCSO (Superior)
- 1994 – 2000 : Martha Elisabeth Driscoll, OCSO (Titular Prioress)
- 2000 – 2019 : Martha Elisabeth Driscoll, OCSO (Abbess)
- 2019- : Cornelia Ellis Lisnawaty, OCSO (Abbess)

== See also ==
- Archdiocese of Semarang
- Enclosed religious orders
- Lamanabi Trappist Monastery in Tanjung Bunga, East Flores
