= Lamanabi Trappist Monastery =

Pertapaan Lamanabi
- Interactive map of Pertapaan Lamanabi

Monastery information
- Full name: Biara Trappist Lamanabi
- Order: Trappists (OCSO)
- Established: 1996
- Mother house: Rawaseneng Monastery
- Diocese: Diocese of Larantuka

People
- Founders: Dom Mikael Santana, OCSO

Site
- Location: Lamanabi Village, Tanjung Bunga, East Flores, East Nusa Tenggara
- Country: Indonesia
- Public access: Yes, outside cloistered area

Lamanabi Trappist Monastery (Indonesian: Biara Trappist Lamanabi, Pertapaan Lamanabi) is a monastery complex of the Catholic Order of Cistercians of the Strict Observance (O.C.S.O.), popularly known as the Trappists, located in East Flores, East Nusa Tenggara, Indonesia. The monastery was officially established on 1996 as a daughter house of Rawaseneng Monastery in Temanggung Regency, Central Java.

Following the Rule of Saint Benedict, like any nuns or monks in other Trappist monasteries, the monks of Lamanabi live independently by doing various manual works to feed themselves, such as producing candles, and doing all of the household works by themselves.

Lamanabi Monastery is known as the "choice of pilgrim" seeking "silence and peace", with Frans Seda and some of the Kompas Gramedia's executives reportedly had made a "pilgrimage" to the monastery.

== Superiors ==
Superiors of the community since the official establishment in 1996:

- 1996 : Mikael Santana, OCSO (Superior)
- 2005 – 2017 : Mikael Santana, OCSO (Prior)

== See also ==
- Bunda Pemersatu Monastery in Semarang Regency
- Diocese of Larantuka
- Enclosed religious orders
