= Trappists =

Roman Catholic religious order

Order of Cistercians of the Strict Observance
- Ordo Cisterciensis Strictioris Observantiae
- Logo of the Trappists

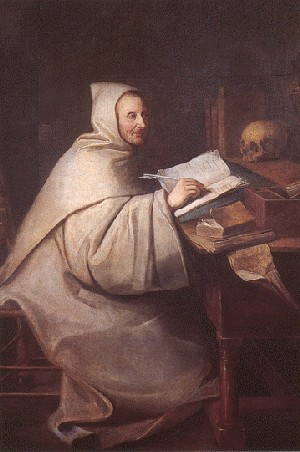
- Armand Jean le Bouthillier de Rancé, the founder of the Trappists
- Abbreviation: OCSO
- Formation: 1664; 362 years ago
- Founder: Armand Jean le Bouthillier de Rancé
- Founded at: La Trappe Abbey
- Type: Catholic religious order
- Headquarters: Viale Africa, 33; Rome, Italy
- Abbot General: Bernardus Peeters
- Parent organization: Catholic Church
- Website: ocso.org

The Trappists, officially known as the Order of Cistercians of the Strict Observance (Latin: Ordo Cisterciensis Strictioris Observantiae, abbreviated as OCSO) and originally named the Order of Reformed Cistercians of Our Lady of La Trappe, are a Catholic religious order of cloistered monastics that branched off from the Cistercians. They follow the Rule of Saint Benedict and have communities of both monks and nuns that are known as Trappists and Trappistines, respectively. They are named after La Trappe Abbey, the monastery from which the movement and religious order originated. The movement began with the reforms that Abbot Armand Jean le Bouthillier de Rancé introduced in 1664, later leading to the creation of Trappist congregations, and eventually the formal constitution as a separate religious order in 1892.

== History ==
The order takes its name from La Trappe Abbey or La Grande Trappe, located in the French province of Normandy, where the reform movement began. Armand Jean le Bouthillier de Rancé, originally the commendatory abbot of La Trappe, led the reform. As commendatory abbot, de Rancé was a secular individual who obtained income from the monastery but was not a professed monk and otherwise had no monastic obligations. The second son of Denis Bouthillier, a Councillor of State, he possessed considerable wealth and was earmarked for an ecclesiastical career as coadjutor bishop to the Archbishop of Tours. However, after undergoing a conversion of life between 1660 and 1662, de Rancé renounced his possessions, formally joined the abbey, and became its regular abbot in 1663.

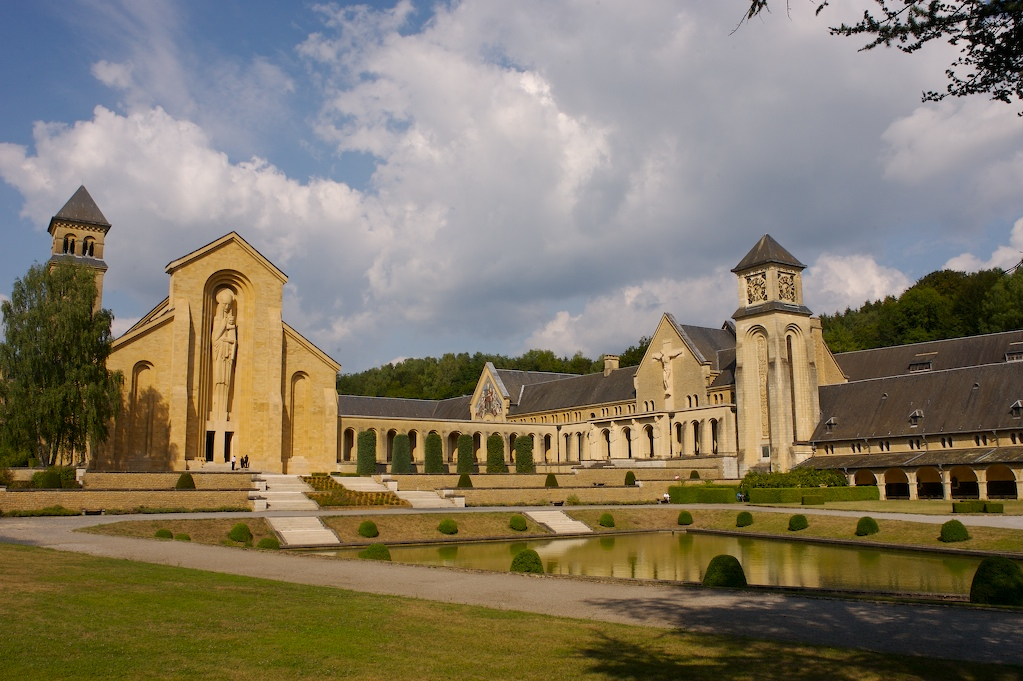
Orval Abbey in Belgium

In 1664, in reaction to the relaxation of practices in many Cistercian monasteries, de Rancé introduced an austere reform. De Rancé's reform was first and foremost centered on penitence; it prescribed hard manual labour, silence, a meagre diet, isolation from the world, and renunciation of most studies. The hard labour was in part a penitential exercise, in part a way of keeping the monastery self-supportive so that communication with the world might be kept at a minimum. This movement spread to many other Cistercian monasteries, which took up de Rancé's reforms. In time, these monasteries also spread and created new foundations of their own. These monasteries called themselves "Trappist" in reference to La Trappe, the source and origin of their reforms.

In 1792, during the French Revolution, La Trappe Abbey, like all other monasteries at the time, was confiscated by the French government and the Trappists expelled. Augustin de Lestrange, a monk of La Trappe at that time, led a number of monks to establish a new monastery in the ruined and unroofed former Carthusian charterhouse of Val-Sainte in the Canton of Fribourg, Switzerland, where the monks subsequently carried out an even more austere reform practising the ancient observances of Benedict of Nursia and the first usages of Cîteaux. In 1794, Pope Pius VI raised Val-Sainte to the status of an abbey and motherhouse of the Trappists, and Dom Augustin was elected the first abbot of the abbey and the leader of the Trappist congregation. However, in 1798, when the French invaded Switzerland, the monks were again exiled and had to roam different countries seeking to establish a new home, until Dom Augustin and his monks of Val-Sainte were finally able to re-establish a community in La Trappe.

In 1834, the Holy See formed all French monasteries into the Congregation of the Cistercian Monks of Notre-Dame de la Trappe, with the abbot of La Trappe being the vicar general of the congregation. However, there were differences in observances between the dependencies of Val-Sainte and those of Notre-Dame de l'Eternité, an abbey itself founded by Val-Sainte in 1795. This led to two different Trappist congregations being formed by decree of the Holy See in 1847. These were named the 'Ancient Reform of Our Lady of La Trappe' and the 'New Reform of Our Lady of La Trappe', the former following the Constitutions of de Rancé, with the latter following the Rule of Saint Benedict combined with the ancient constitution of Cîteaux, except in a few areas prescribed by the Holy See in the same decree.

In 1892, seeking unity among the different Trappist observances, the Trappist congregations left the Cistercian Order entirely and merged to form a new order with the approval of Pope Leo XIII named the 'Order of Reformed Cistercians of Our Lady of La Trappe', formalising their identity and spirituality as a separate monastic community.

In 1909, the Trappists of Mariannhill were separated from the rest of the Trappist Order by decree of the Holy See to form the Congregation of Mariannhill Missionaries.

A well-known Trappist theologian was Thomas Merton, a prominent author in the mystic tradition and a noted poet and social and literary critic. He entered the Abbey of Gethsemani in 1941 where his writings and letters to world leaders became some of the most widely read spiritual and social works of the 20th century. Merton's widely read works include his autobiography, The Seven Storey Mountain, as well as New Seeds of Contemplation and No Man is an Island.

The first Trappist to be canonized was Rafael Arnáiz Barón, who was a conventual oblate of the Abbey of San Isidro de Dueñas in Dueñas, Palencia. His defining characteristic was his intense devotion to a religious life and personal piety despite the setbacks of his affliction with diabetes mellitus. He died in 1938, aged 27 from complications of diabetes, was beatified in 1992 by Pope John Paul II and canonized in 2009 by Pope Benedict XVI.

== Monastic life ==
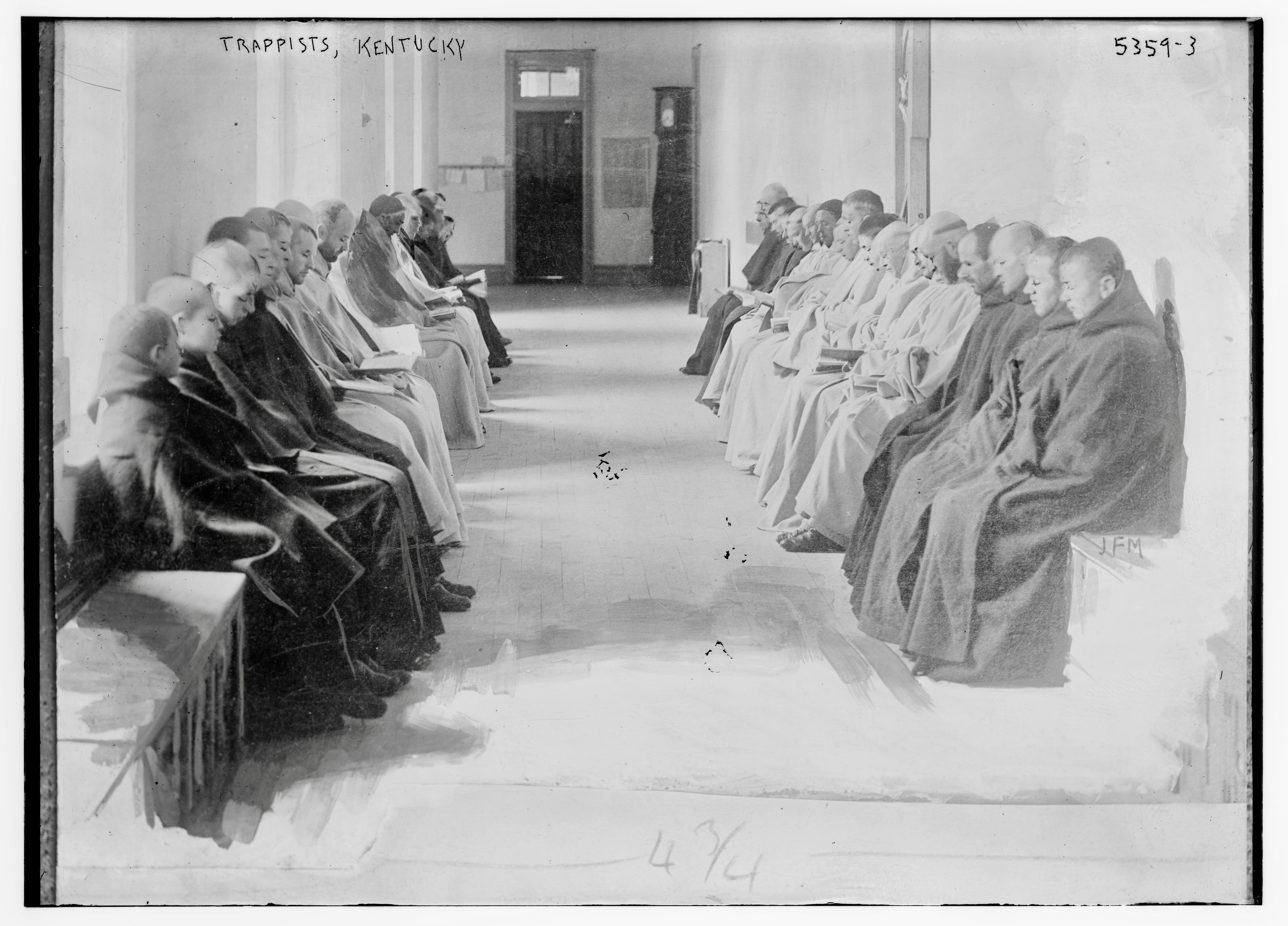
Monks of the Abbey of Our Lady of Gethsemani in the early 20th century

Trappists, like the Benedictines and Cistercians from whom they originate, follow the Rule of Saint Benedict. "Strict Observance" refers to the Trappists' goal to follow the Rule closely. They take the three vows described in the Rule (c. 58): stability, fidelity to monastic life, and obedience.

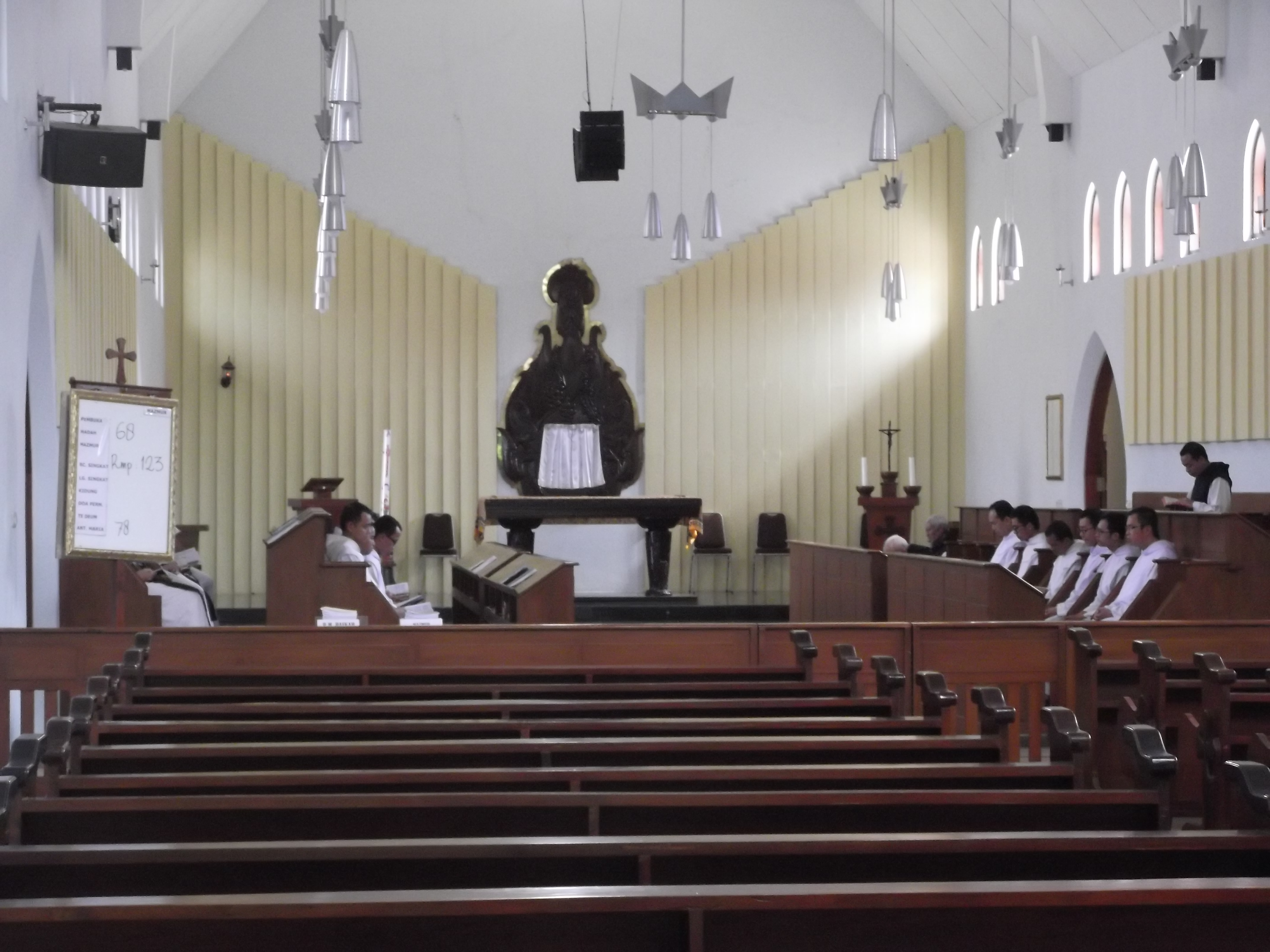
Trappist monks in Pertapaan Rawaseneng, Indonesia, praying Terce

Benedict's precept to minimize conversation means that Trappists generally speak only when necessary; idle talk is strongly discouraged. But contrary to popular belief, they do not take a vow of silence. According to Benedict, speech disturbs a disciple's quietude and receptivity, and may tempt one to exercise one's own will instead of God's. Speech that leads to unkind amusement or laughter is considered evil and forbidden. A Trappist sign language, one of several monastic sign languages, was developed to render speaking unnecessary. Meals are usually taken in contemplative silence while listening to a reading.

Unlike the Benedictines and Cistercians, Trappists fully abstain from "flesh meats" (pig, cattle, sheep, venison, etc), described by Saint Benedict as "four-footed animals". But they generally do not live as strict vegetarians, consuming poultry, fish, and seafood, though their diet mostly consists of vegetables, beans, and grain products. Some monasteries also raise broiler chickens.

=== Daily life ===
The Liturgy of the Hours is the foundation of every Trappist's life. The details vary by community and are based on the liturgical calendar. The following schedule is a representative summary of a Trappist's daily life.

- 3:30 AM | Rise
- 4:00 AM | Vigils followed by Meditation, Lectio Divina or private prayer
- 5:30 AM | Breakfast available
- 6:30 AM | Lauds
- 7:30 AM | Eucharist (Mass) (10:00 AM on Sundays)
- 8:00 AM | Great Silence Ends
- 8:30 AM | Terce
- 9:00 AM | Morning work period begins
- 12:00 PM | Sext
- 12:15 PM | Dinner
- 12:45 PM | Rest
- 1:30 PM | None
- 1:45 PM | Afternoon work period begins
- 5:00 PM | Supper
- 6:00 PM | Vespers
- 7:30 PM | Compline
- 8:00 PM | Great Silence Begins & Retire

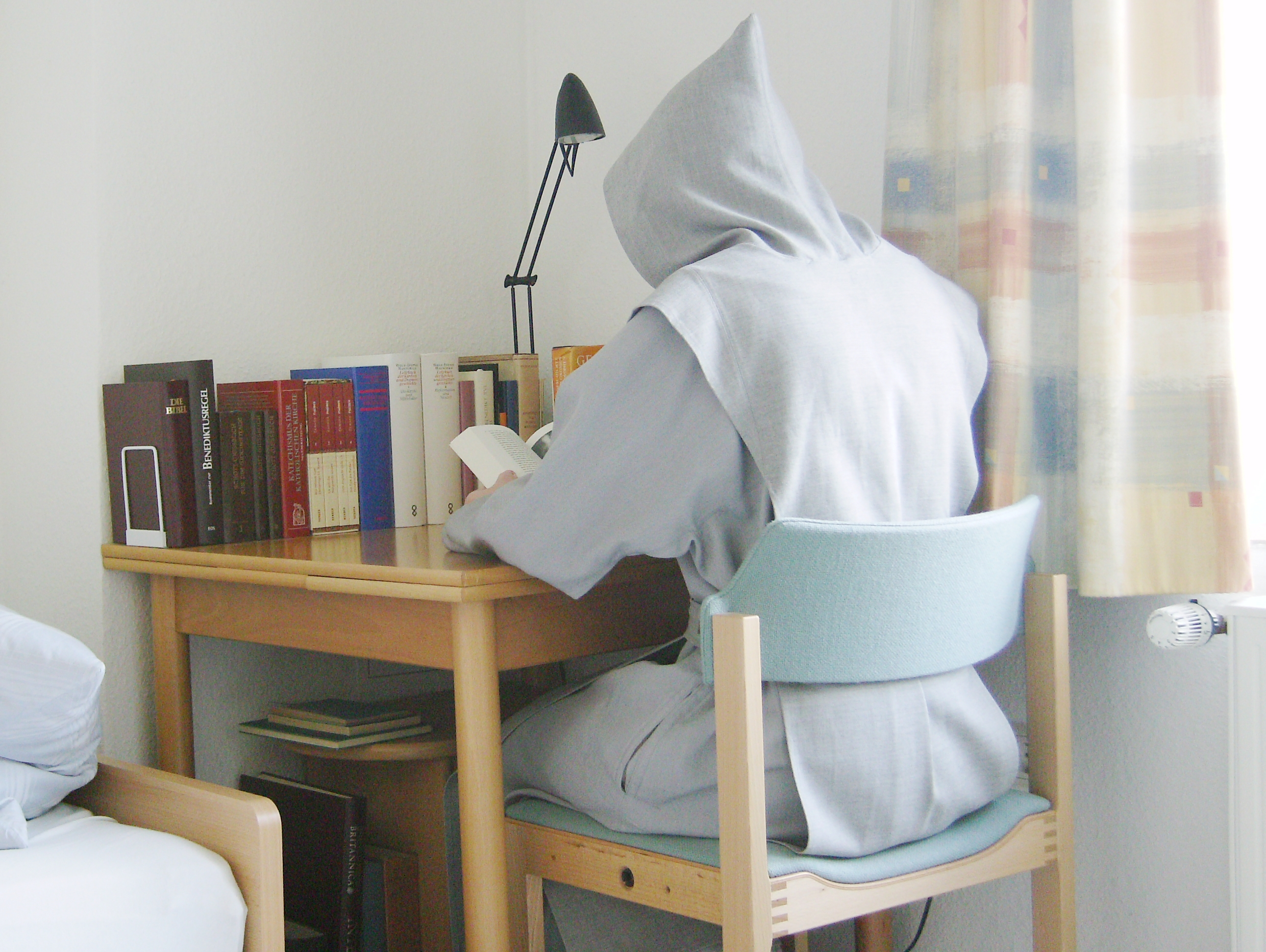
A Trappist novice reading at his desk

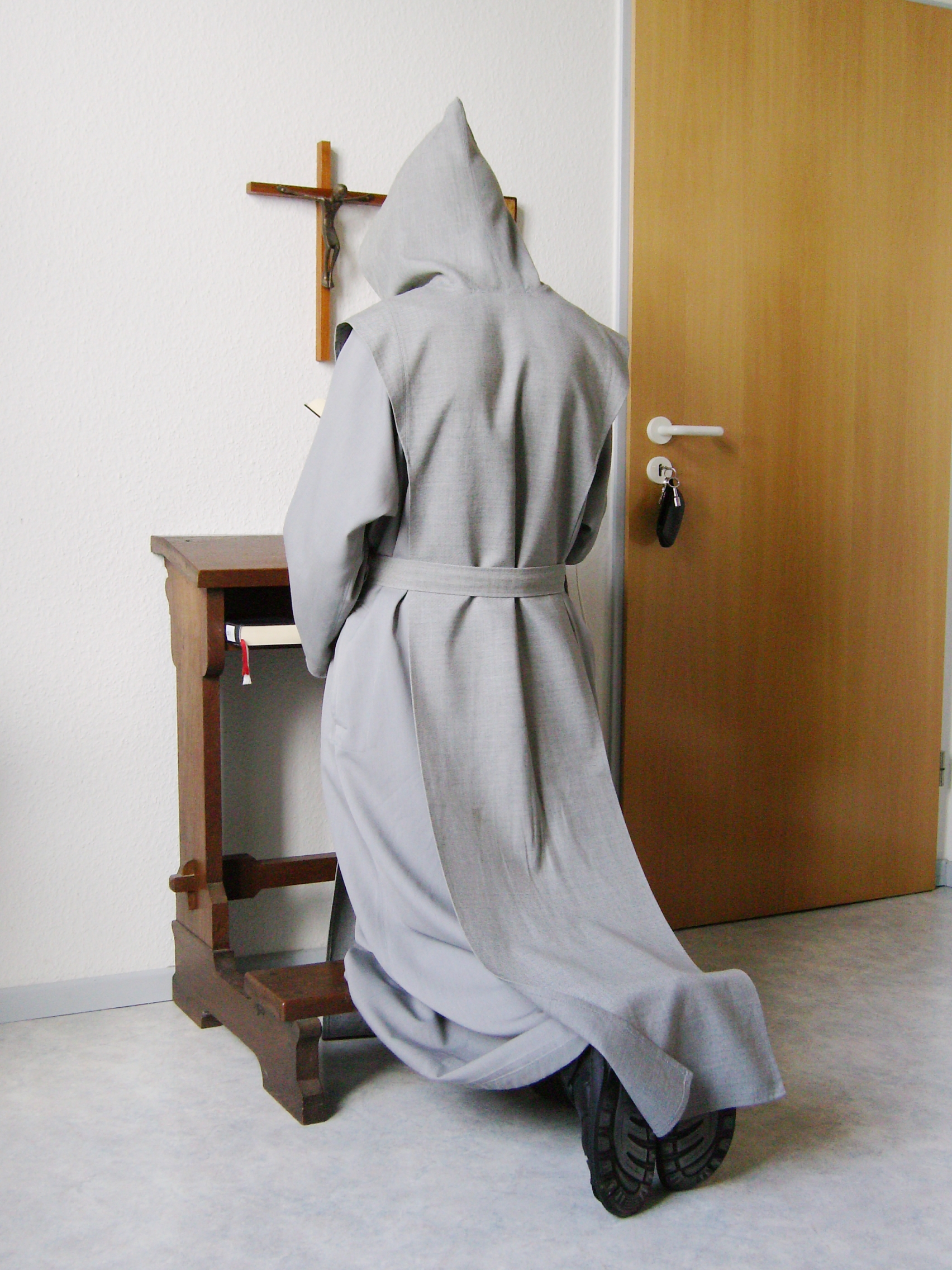
A Trappist novice kneeling at a crucifix

=== Becoming a Trappist ===
Each monastery is autonomous and has its own rules, but the stages of entering the Trappist life are generally as follows:

- Candidate/observership: candidates or observers visit a monastery and consult the vocation director and/or the superior to help them discern their vocation. Usually they are asked to live in the monastery for a short period, at least a month.
- Postulancy: candidates live as a member of the monastery as a postulant for some months and are guided by the novice director.
- Novitiate: postulants are clothed with the monastic habit and formally received as members of the order. Novices are still guided by the novice director, and undergo this stage for two years.
- After novitiate, novices may take temporary vows. They live this stage for three to nine years to deepen study, practicing the Gospel in the monastic way, and integrate within the society.
- After finishing the previous stage, professed members may take final vows for life.

=== Manual labor ===
The 48th chapter of the Rule of St. Benedict says, "for then are they monks in truth, if they live by the work of their hands". Thus a Trappist monk's life centers on manual labor in addition to spiritual activity. In addition to the tangible results of manual labor, which supports the economy of the community and the poor, the monk's work also reinforces the monk's and community's spiritual growth.

The goods produced range from cheeses, bread, and other foodstuffs to clothing and coffins. Their most famous products are Trappist beers. These are a unique category in the beer world, and are lauded for their high quality and flavor. Monasteries brew beer for both the monks themselves and sale to the general public. Trappist beers are bottle conditioned, containing residual sugars and living yeast to improve with age.

The Trappist monks of the Tre Fontane Abbey raise the lambs whose wool is used to make the pallia of metropolitan archbishops. The pope blesses the pallia on the Feast of Saints Peter and Paul; the metropolitan archbishops receive those pallia in a separate ceremony in their home dioceses from the hands of the apostolic nuncio, who represents the pope in their respective countries.

The monks of New Melleray Abbey in Peosta, Iowa, produce caskets for both themselves and sale to the public.

Cistercian College, Roscrea, a boys' boarding secondary school in Ireland, is the only Trappist school left in the world, and one of only two remaining monastic secondary schools in Ireland.

== Saints, Blesseds, and other holy people ==
Saints

- Rafael (Maria Rafael) Arnáiz Barón (9 April 1911 – 26 April 1938), oblate, canonized on 11 October 2009

Blesseds

- Augustin-Joseph (Élie) Desgardin (21 December 1750 – 6 July 1794), Martyr of the French Revolution, beatified on 1 October 1995
- Gervais-Protais Brunel (18 June 1744 – 20 August 1794), Martyr of the French Revolution, beatified on 1 October 1995
- Paul-Jean Charles (29 September 1743 – 25 August 1794), Martyr of the French Revolution, beatified on 1 October 1995
- Pierre-Joseph Cassant (6 March 1878 – 17 June 1903), priest, beatified on 3 October 2004
- Pio Heredia Zubia and 15 Companions (died between 28 July and 31 December 1936), Martyrs of the Spanish Civil War, beatified on 3 October 2015
- Maria Gabriella Sagheddu (17 March 1914 – 23 April 1939), nun, beatified on 25 January 1983
- Cyprian Michael Iwene Tansi (c. September 1903 – 20 January 1964), Nigerian priest, beatified on 22 March 1998
- Christian de Cherge and 6 Companions (died 21 May 1996), martyred during the Algerian Civil War, beatified on 8 December 2018

Venerables

- Romano Bottegal (28 December 1921 – 19 February 1978), priest, declared Venerable on 9 December 2013

Servants of God

- Joseph (Alois) Bley (25 January 1865 – 13 August 1904), martyred in Papua New Guinea
- Wendelin (Franz) Pfanner (21 September 1825 – 24 May 1909), Abbot of Mariannhill Abbey and founder of the Missionary Sisters of the Precious Blood and Congregation of the Missionaries of Mariannhill, declared as a Servant of God on 8 April 2013
- André (Marie-Emmanuel) Robial (25 October 1884 – 9 October 1937), Martyr of China from the Diocese of Zhengding, declared as a Servant of God in 2015
- Chrysostomus Chang and 32 Companions (died between 15 August 1947 and c. April 1948), Martyrs of China from the Monastery of Yangjiaping
- Zacarías Santamaría Aramendía (10 June 1907 – 20 August 1986), professed religious, declared as a Servant of God on 14 December 2002
- Anselm (Abraham) Isidahome Ojefua (15 January 1910 – 28 July 1988), Nigerian priest and founder of the Knights of Saint Mulumba, declared as a Servant of God on 28 October 2020
- Jean-Richard (François) Mahieu (15 April 1919 – 31 January 2002), Belgian priest
- Michael Strode (5 June 1923 – 27 December 2010), English oblate

== Organization ==
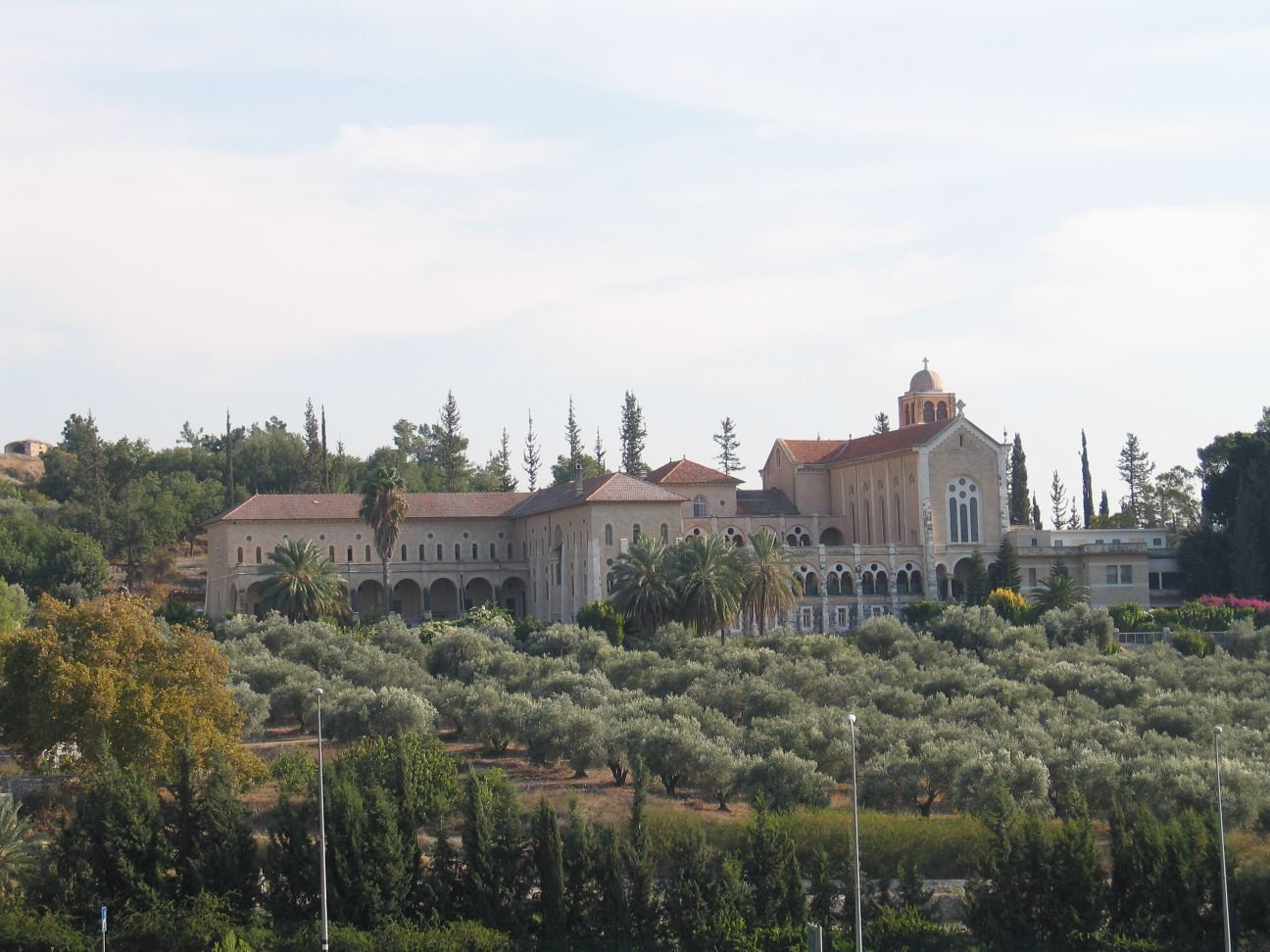
Latroun Abbey, Latroun, Israel

Cistercian monasteries have continued to spread, with many founded outside Europe in the 20th century. In particular, the number of Trappist monasteries throughout the world has more than doubled over the past 60 years: from 82 in 1940 to 127 in 1970, and 169 at the beginning of the 21st century. In 1940, there were six Trappist monasteries in Asia and the Pacific, only one Trappist monastery in Africa, and none in Latin America. Now there are 13 in Central and South America, 17 in Africa, and 23 in Asia and the Pacific. In general, these communities are growing faster than those in other parts of the world.

Over the same period, the total number of monks and nuns in the Order decreased by about 15%. There are on average 25 members per community – less than half those in former times. As of 1 January 2018, there were 1,796 Trappist monks and 1,592 Trappistine nuns across the world.

=== Institutional Structure ===
Cistercian communities are autonomous but united in a communion implemented by key institutions:

- Regular Visitation: An independent "Father Immediate" is appointed to help and support the abbot in the exercise of his pastoral charge and to foster concord in the community. The Father Immediate or other representative visits the monastery approximately every two years. The purpose of this “Regular Visitation” is to strengthen and supplement the pastoral action of the local superior, to correct violations where necessary, and to renew the nuns’ or monks’ spiritual fervor.
- General Chapter: The General Chapter is the supreme authority of the order. Since 2011, Abbots and Abbesses form a single General Chapter. They meet every 3 years for three weeks to strengthen the bonds of the order and to make key decisions, including the election of the Abbot General when necessary. The Abbot General chairs the General Chapter.

=== Abbots General ===
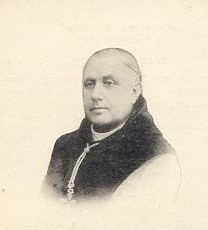
Sébastien Wyart, 1st Abbot General of the Trappists between 1892 and 1904

The Abbot General is elected for an unrestricted amount of time by the General Chapter. He is assisted by a Council that is composed of five members, four of them are elected by the General Chapter and the fifth is chosen by the elected Council members. The Abbot General and his Council reside in Rome and are generally in charge of the order's affairs. The present Abbot General is Dom Bernardus Peeters of Koningshoeven Abbey in the Netherlands.

1. 1892–1904: Sébastien Wyart
2. 1904–1922: Augustin Marre
3. 1922–1929: Jean-Baptiste Ollitraut de Keryvallan
4. 1929–1943: Herman-Joseph Smets
5. 1943–1951: Dominique Nogues
6. 1951–1963: Gabriel Sortais
7. 1964–1974: Ignace Gillet
8. 1974–1990: Ambroise Southey
9. 1990–2008: Bernardo-Luis-José Oliveira
10. 2008–2022: Eamon Fitzgerald
11. 2022–present: Bernardus Peeters

=== List of Trappist monasteries and convents ===
As of 2018, there were 168 Trappist monasteries and convents.

Monks	Nuns
Africa
Abbey of Our Lady of Atlas, Médéa, Algeria; Mosteiro Cisterciense, Benguela, Angola; (Democratic Republic of the Congo) Monastère Notre-Dame de l'Emmanuel, Kinshasa, DR Congo; (Democratic Republic of the Congo) Monastere Notre-Dame des Mokoto, Goma, DR Congo; Our Lady of Mount Calvary Monastery, Enugu, Nigeria; Holy Cross Monastery, Illah, Nigeria; Our Lady of the Angels Priory, Nsugbe, Nigeria; Monastère Notre-Dame de Kokoubou, Parakou, Benin; Monastera Masina Maria, Fianarantsoa, Madagascar; Bamenda Abbey, Bamenda, Cameroon; Monastère Notre-Dame de Koutaba, Koundja, Cameroon; Priory of Our Lady of Atlas, Midelt, Morocco; Monastery of Our Lady of Victoria, Kyotera, Uganda	Mosteiro Cisterciense, Huambo, Angola; (Democratic Republic of the Congo) Abbaye de la Clarté-Dieu, Cyangugu, Bukavu, DR Congo; (Democratic Republic of the Congo) Monastère Notre-Dame de Mvanda, Kinshasa, DR Congo; St. Justina's Monastery, Abakaliki, Nigeria; Monastère l'Étoile Notre-Dame, Parakou, Benin; Monastera Masina Maria Ampibanjinana, Fianarantsoa, Madagascar; Soeurs Trappistines, Kibungo, Rwanda; Monastère Notre-Dame de Grandselve, Obout, Cameroon; Abbey Our Lady of Praise, Butende, Masaka, Uganda
Asia
Our Lady of Joy Abbey, Lantao, Hong Kong; Kurisumala Ashram in Vagamon, India; Pertapaan Trappist Lamanabi in Tanjung Bunga, East Flores, Indonesia; Pertapaan Santa Maria Rawaseneng in Kandangan, Temanggung, Indonesia; Latroun Abbey, Latrun, Israel; Our Lady of the Annunciation Monastery in Minamihata near Hiji, Ōita, Japan; Our Lady of the Lighthouse Abbey in Mitsuishi, Hokkaido, Japan; Our Lady of the Philippines Trappist Abbey in Jordan, Guimaras, Philippines; Holy Mother of God Monastery in Shuili, Nantou, Taiwan	Ananda Matha Ashram, Kunnambetta near Wayanad, India; Pertapaan Bunda Pemersatu Gedono in Getasan, Semarang, Indonesia; Ajimu no Seibo Shudoin in Kayagomori, Ōita Prefecture, Japan; Torapisuto Shudoin in Imari, Saga, Japan; Our Lady of Nasu Monastery in Nasu, Tochigi, Japan; B. M. Nishinomiya (Torapisuto), Nishinomiya, Japan; Torapisuto Shudoin (Tenshien) in Kamiyunokawa near Hakodate, Hokkaido, Japan; Trappistine Monastery "Our Lady Star of Hope", Macau; Our Lady of Matutum in Polomolok, South Cotabato, Philippines; Trappistine Monastery in Sujong-ri, Masanhappo-gu, South Korea; Monastero Beata Maria Fons Pacis in Talkalakh, Syria
Europe
Engelszell Abbey in Engelhartszell, Austria; Saint Benedictus-Abbey in Achel, Belgium (closed January 2021); Abbaye Notre-Dame d'Orval in Villers-devant-Orval, Belgium; Abbey of Notre-Dame de Saint-Rémy in Rochefort, Belgium; Scourmont Abbey in Forges, Belgium; St. Sixtus' Abbey in Westvleteren, Belgium; Westmalle Abbey in Westmalle, Belgium; Opatija Marija Zvijezda in Banja Luka, Bosnia and Herzegovina; Nový Dvůr Monastery, Czech Republic; Myrendal Kloster in Allinge, Denmark; Abbaye Notre-Dame d'Acey in Vitreux, France; Abbaye Notre-Dame d'Aiguebelle in Montjoyer, France; Abbaye Notre-Dame de Bellefontaine in Bégrolles en Mauges, France; Abbaye Notre-Dame de Grâce in Bricquebec, France; Abbaye Notre-Dame de Cîteaux in Saint-Nicolas-lès-Cîteaux, France; Abbaye Sainte-Marie du Désert in Bellegarde-Sainte-Marie, France; Abbaye Notre-Dame de la Trappe in Soligny-la-Trappe, France; Abbaye Notre-Dame de Melleray in La Meilleraye-de-Bretagne, France; Abbaye Sainte-Marie-du-Mont in Godewaersvelde, France; Abbaye Notre-Dame-des-Neiges in St-Laurent-les-Bains, France; Abbaye Notre-Dame d'Oelenberg in Reiningue, France; Abbaye Notre-Dame du Port-du-Salut in Entrammes, France; Abbaye Notre-Dame de Sept-Fons in Dompierre-sur-Besbre, France; Abbaye Notre-Dame de Tamié in Plancherine, France; Abbaye Notre-Dame de Timadeuc in Bréhan, France; Mariawald Abbey in Heimbach, Germany (closed September 2018); (Republic of Ireland) Mellifont Abbey in Collon, Ireland; (Republic of Ireland) Mount Melleray Abbey in Cappoquin, Ireland; (Republic of Ireland) Mount St. Joseph Abbey in Roscrea, Ireland; Monastero Cistercense “Madonna dell’Unione” di Boschi in Monastero di Vasco, Italy; Abbazia Nostra Signora del Santissimo Sacramento in Frattocchie, Italy; Abbazia delle Tre Fontane in Rome, Italy; Abdij O. L. Vr. van Sion in Diepenveen, Netherlands; Cisterciënser Abdij Lilbosch in Echt, Netherlands; Abdij O.L.Vrouw van Koningshoeven in Berkel-Enschot, Netherlands; Abdij Maria-Toevlucht in Klein Zundert, Netherlands; Munkeby Abbey near Levanger, Norway; Monasterio de San Pedro de Cardeña in Castrillo del Val, Spain; Monasterio de Santa María de las Escalonias in Hornachuelos, Spain; Monasterio de Santa María de Huerta in Santa María de Huerta, Spain; Monasterio de Santa María la Real de la Oliva in Carcastillo, Spain; Monasterio de Monte Sión in Toledo, Spain; Monastery of Santa María la Real of Oseira in Oseira, Spain; Monasterio de San Isidro de Dueñas in San Isidro de Dueñas, Spain; Monasterio de Santa María de Sobrado in Sobrado, Spain; Abadía de Santa María de Viaceli in Cóbreces, Spain; Monasterio de Santa María de Cenarruza in Cenarruza, Spain; (United Kingdom) Caldey Abbey on Caldey Island, Wales; (United Kingdom) Mount Saint Bernard Abbey near Coalville, England; (United Kingdom) Sancta Maria Abbey in Nunraw, Scotland; (United Kingdom) Our Lady of Bethlehem Abbey in Portglenone, Northern Ireland	Abbaye Notre-Dame de Brialmont in Tilff, Esneux, Belgium; Abbaye Notre-Dame de la Paix in Chimay, Belgium; Abbaye Notre-Dame de Clairefontaine in Bouillon, Belgium; Priorij O.L. Vr van Klaarland in Bocholt, Belgium; Abdij O.L. Vr. van Nazareth in Brecht, Belgium; Abbaye Notre-Dame de Soleilmont in Fleurus, Belgium; Klášter Naší Paní nad Vltavou in Neveklov, Czech Republic; Abbaye Notre-Dame de Baumgarten in Bernardvillé, France; Abbaye de Belval in Troisvaux, France; Abbaye Notre-Dame de Bon Secours in Blauvac, France; Abbaye Notre-Dame de Bonneval in Le Cayrol, France; Monastère de la Paix-Dieu in Anduze, France; Abbaye de la Joie Notre-Dame in Campénéac, France; Notre-Dame du Sacré-Cœur de Chambarand in Roybon, France; Abbaye Notre-Dame de Bonne-Espérance in Échourgnac, France; Monastère Notre-Dame des Gardes in Saint-Georges-des-Gardes, France; Monastère Notre-Dame de la Coudre in Laval, France; Monastère du Jassonneix in Meymac, France; Abbaye Sainte-Marie du Rivet in Auros, France; Abbaye Notre-Dame de Saint-Joseph d'Ubexy in Charmes, France; Abbaye Notre-Dame du Val d'Igny in Arcis-le-Ponsart, France; Kloster Gethsemani at Donnersberg near Dannenfels, Germany; Trappistinnenabtei Maria Frieden in Dahlem, Germany; (Republic of Ireland) St. Mary's Abbey in Glencairn near Lismore, County Waterford, Ireland; Monastero di N.S. di Valserena in Guardistallo, Italy; Monastero Trappiste Nostra Signora di San Giuseppe in Vitorchiano, Italy; Abdij O.L. Vr. van Koningsoord in Arnhem, Netherlands; Tautra Mariakloster in Frosta, Norway; Monasterio Santa MarÍa de San José in Alloz-Estella, Spain; Monasterio de Santa María la Real near Arévalo, Spain; Monasterio de Armenteira in Armenteira, Spain; Monasterio Cisterciense de Santa Ana in Avila, Spain; Monasterio Santa Maria de Gratia Dei in Benaguasil, Spain; Monasterio de Santa María de Carrizo in Carrizo de La Ribera, Spain; Monasterio Nuestra Señora de la Paz in La Palma, Cartagena, Spain; Monasterio de Santa María de la Caridad in Tulebras, Spain; Monasterio de Nuestra Señora de Vico in Arnedo, Spain; Abbaye de la Fille-Dieu in Romont, Switzerland; Monastère Notre Dame de Géronde in Sierre, Switzerland; (United Kingdom) Holy Cross Abbey in Whitland, Wales
Latin America
Abadía Nuestra Señora de los Angeles in Azul, Argentina; Nossa Senhora do Novo Mundo in Campo do Tenente, Brazil; Monasterio Sta Maria de Miraflores in Rancagua, Chile; Monasterio Santa Maria del Evangelio in Jarabacoa, Dominican Republic; Monasterio de Santa María del Paraíso in Latacunga, Ecuador; Monasterio Cisterciense Virgen del Curutarán in Jacona, Mexico; Monasterio Nuestra Señora de los Andes in El Vigía, Venezuela	Monasterio de la Madre de Cristo Hermanas Trapenses in Hinojo, Argentina; Mosteiro Trapista Nossa Senhora da Boa Vista in Rio Negrinho, Brazil; Monasterio Nuestra Señora de Quilvo in Curicó, Chile; Monasterio de Santa María de la Esperanza in Esmeraldas, Ecuador; Abadía Madre de Dios El Encuentro Rincón de San Jerónimo in Ciudad Hidalgo, Mexico; Monasterio Santa Maria de la Paz in Santo Tomás, Nicaragua; Monasterio N.S. de Coromoto in El Tocuyo, Venezuela
North America
Notre Dame du Calvaire Abbey in Nouvelle-Arcadie, New Brunswick, Canada; Monastère N.-D. de Mistassini in Dolbeau-Mistassini, Quebec, Canada; Our Lady of the Prairies Abbey in Holland, Manitoba, Canada; Abbaye Val Notre-Dame in Saint-Jean-de-Matha, Quebec, Canada; Abbey of Notre-Dame du Lac in Oka, Quebec, Canada, now defunct; Assumption Abbey in Douglas County, Missouri, United States; Holy Cross Abbey in Berryville, Virginia, United States; Monastery of the Holy Spirit in Conyers, Georgia, United States; Our Lady of the Genesee Abbey in Piffard, New York, United States; Abbey of Our Lady of Gethsemani in Bardstown, Kentucky, United States; Our Lady of Guadalupe Abbey in Carlton, Oregon, United States; Abbey of Our Lady of the Holy Trinity in Huntsville, Utah, United States. Closed down August 2017.; Mepkin Abbey in Moncks Corner, South Carolina, United States; New Melleray Abbey in Peosta, Iowa, United States; St. Joseph's Abbey in Spencer, Massachusetts, United States; Abbey of New Clairvaux in Vina, California, United States	Notre-Dame de l'Assomption Abbey in Nouvelle-Arcadie, New Brunswick, Canada; Abbaye N.-D. du Bon Conseil in Saint-Benoît-Labre, Quebec, Canada; Our Lady of the Angels Monastery in Crozet, Virginia, United States; Our Lady of the Mississippi Abbey in Dubuque, Iowa, United States; Our Lady of the Redwoods Abbey in Whitethorn, California, United States; Santa Rita Abbey in Sonoita, Arizona, United States; Mount St. Mary's Abbey in Wrentham, Massachusetts, United States
Oceania
Tarrawarra Abbey in Yarra Glen, Australia; Southern Star Abbey in Takapau, New Zealand	None

== See also ==
- Cistercian Martyrs of Atlas
- Enclosed religious orders
- Missionary Order of Mariannhill
