= Rawaseneng Monastery =

Pertapaan Rawaseneng
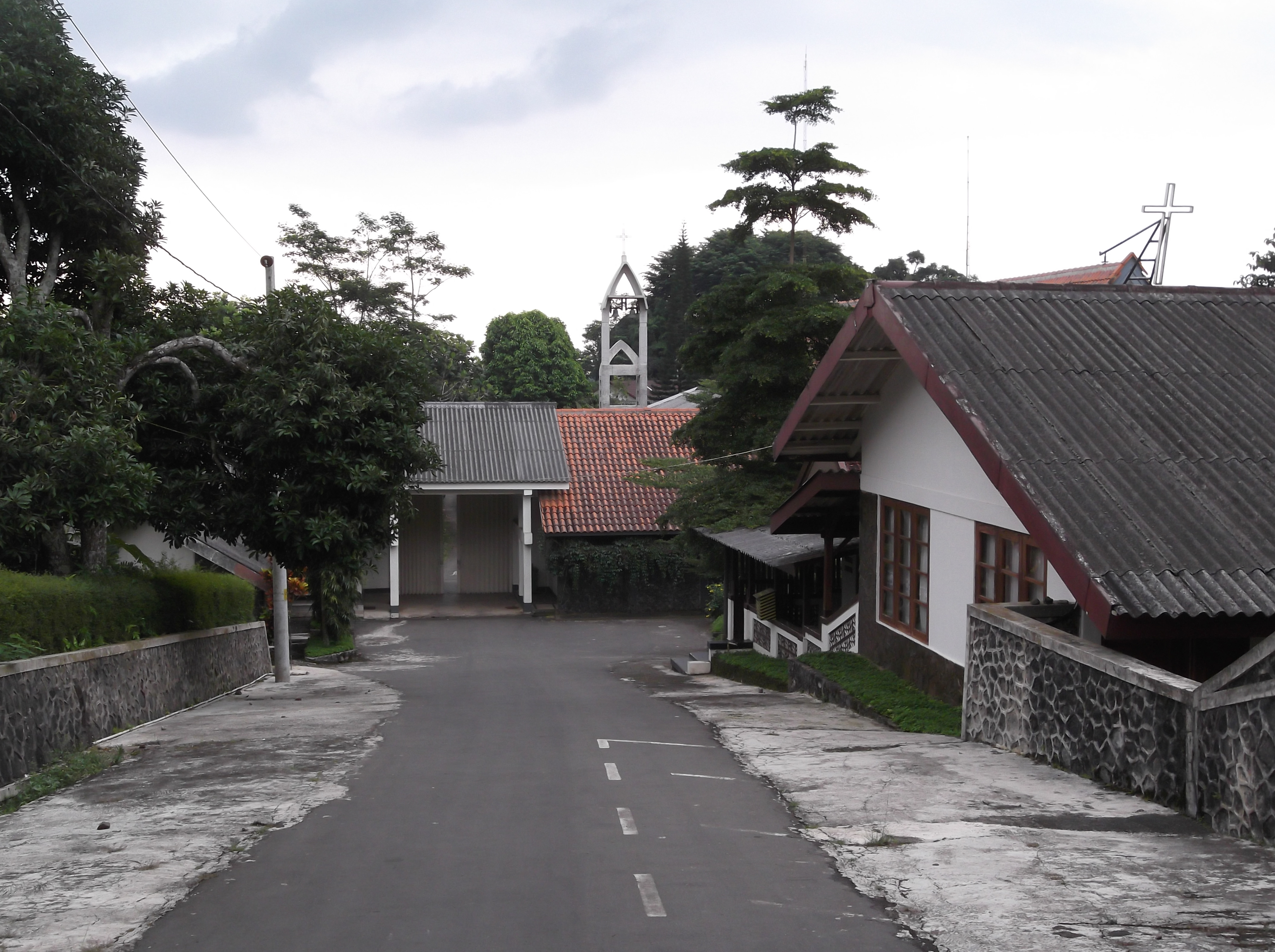
- Entrance to Rawaseneng Monastery
- Interactive map of Pertapaan Rawaseneng

Monastery information
- Full name: Pertapaan Santa Maria Rawaseneng
- Order: Trappist (OCSO)
- Established: 1 April 1953
- Mother house: Koningshoeven Abbey, Tilburg, Netherlands
- Dedication: Saint Mary
- Diocese: Archdiocese of Semarang

People
- Founders: Dom Bavo van der Ham, OCSO
- Abbot: Dom Aloysius Gonzaga Rudiyat, OCSO
- Important associated figures: Dom Frans Harjawiyata, OCSO

Site
- Location: Ngemplak Village, Kandangan, Temanggung, Central Java
- Country: Indonesia
- Coordinates: 7°13′1″S 110°12′36″E
- Public access: Yes, outside cloistered area

Rawaseneng Monastery (Indonesian: Pertapaan Rawaseneng, Pertapaan Santa Maria Rawaseneng) is a monastery complex of the Catholic Order of Cistercians of the Strict Observance (O.C.S.O.), popularly known as the Trappists, located in Temanggung Regency, Central Java, Indonesia. The monastery was officially established on 1 April 1953 as a daughter house of Koningshoeven Abbey in Tilburg, Netherlands. Apart from being a residence for the monks, there are also a church, prayer garden, retreat houses, coffee plantations, dairy farms along with the processing industries within the monastery complex. Ronald Bell, a pilgrim from the United States, shares his impression about this place, "You will get all the stages, praying, meditating, contemplating sacred readings, and working. All of those constitute an inseparable part of the experience." Not far from the monastery complex, it lies the Church of Santa Maria dan Yoseph as the center of the Rawaseneng Parish, just ahead of the Kindergarten and Elementary School of Fatima Rawaseneng which are managed by the Dominican nuns.

Like the monks in other Trappist monasteries, the monks of Rawaseneng Monastery lives on prayer and works of their hands. The results of their works on coffee plantations, dairy farms, and bakery/cake industries become the main source of livelihood of the monks in the monastery, thus they do not live by relying on contribution from the congregation. In his address during the 60th anniversary celebration of the Rawaseneng Monastery on 25 August 2013, Archbishop Johannes Pujasumarta said, "Together with the nuns of the Trappist Gedono, they present a Church that prays and works in the Archdiocese of Semarang."

== Superiors ==
Superiors of the community since the official establishment in 1953:

- 1953 – 1958 : Bavo van der Ham, OCSO (Superior)
- 1958 – 1963 : Bavo van der Ham, OCSO (Titular Prior)
- 1963 – 1966 : Frans Harjawiyata, OCSO (Superior ad nutum)
- 1966 – 1968 : Willibrord van Dijk, OCSO (Superior ad nutum)
- 1968 – 1970 : Bavo van der Ham, OCSO (Superior ad nutum)
- 1970 – 1976 : Bavo van der Ham, OCSO (Titular Prior)
- 1976 – 1976 : Frans Harjawiyata, OCSO (Superior ad nutum)
- 1976 – 1978 : Frans Harjawiyata, OCSO (Titular Prior)
- 1978 – 2006 : Frans Harjawiyata, OCSO (Abbot)
- 2006 – present : Aloysius Gonzaga Rudiyat, OCSO (Abbot)

== Daughter houses ==
Rawaseneng Monastery has founded following daughter houses:

- Bunda Pemersatu Monastery in Weru, Jetak Village, in Getasan, Semarang, Indonesia (nuns)
- Lamanabi Trappist Monastery in Lamanabi Village, Tanjung Bunga, East Flores, Indonesia (monks)
- Trappistine Monastery "Our Lady Star of Hope", Macau (nuns)

== Gallery ==
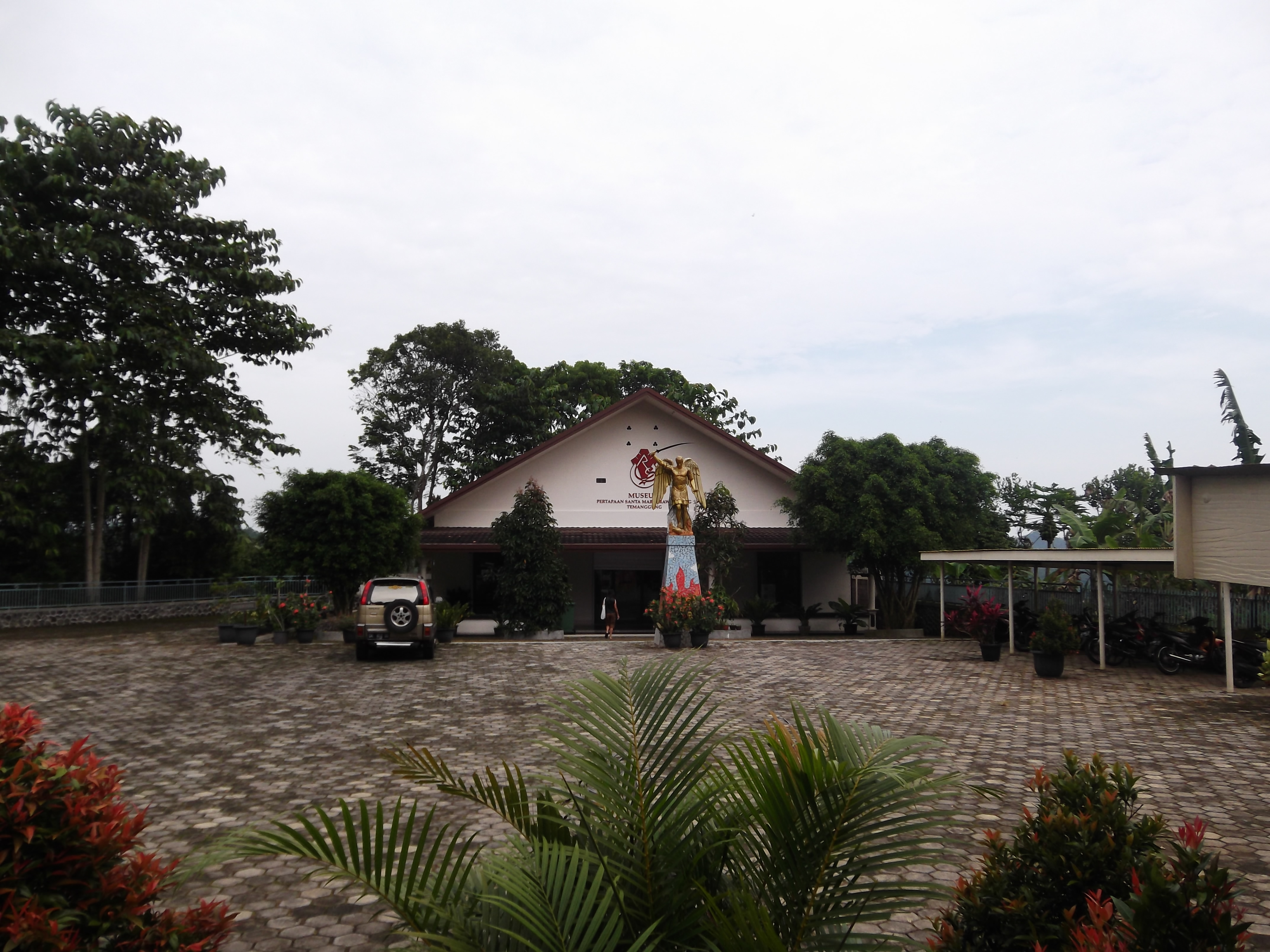
Museum, religious goods store and dairy store, as well parking lot.

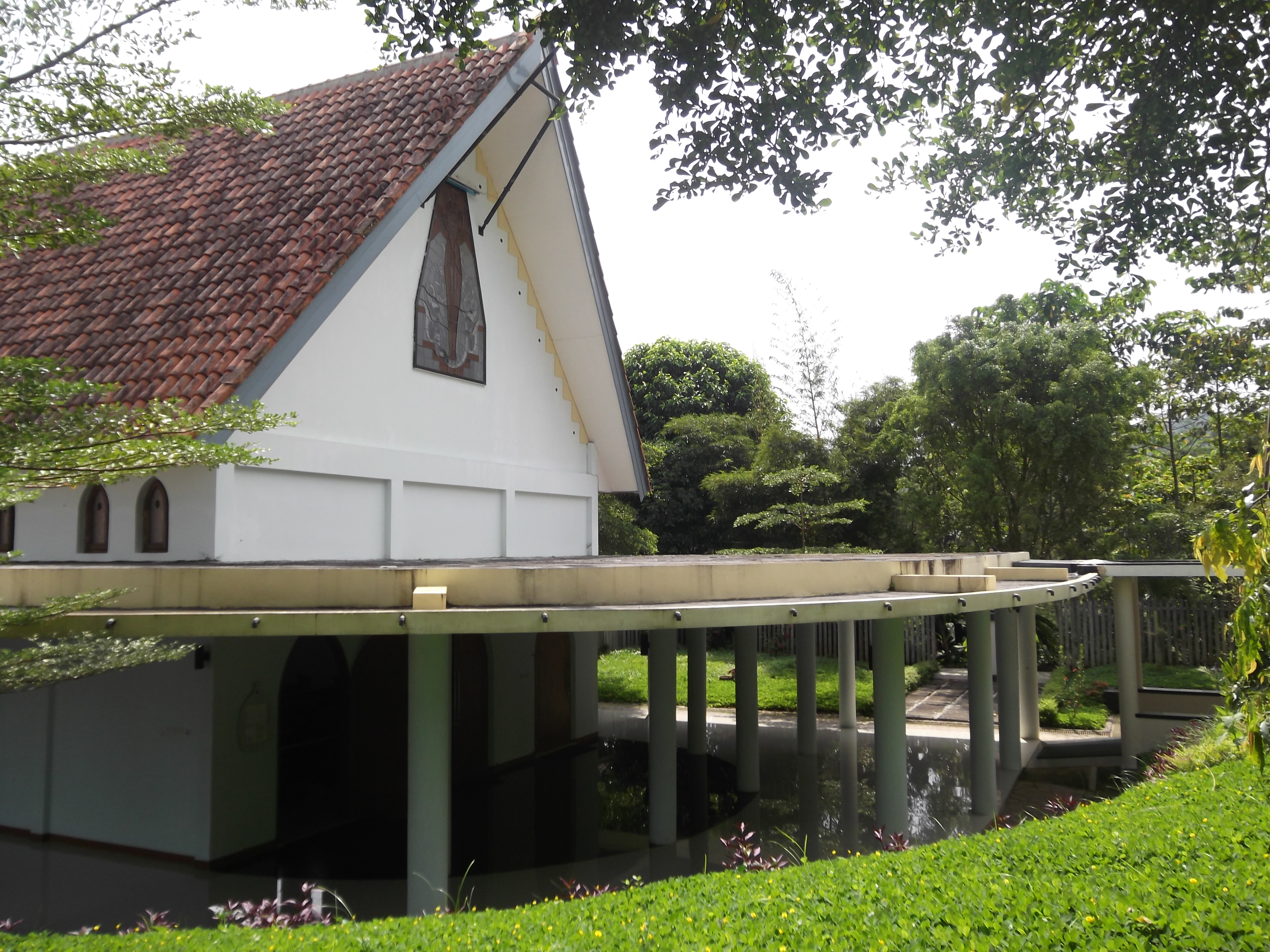
Church of Rawaseneng Monastery, as seen from the entrance to monastery complex at the left side of the church.

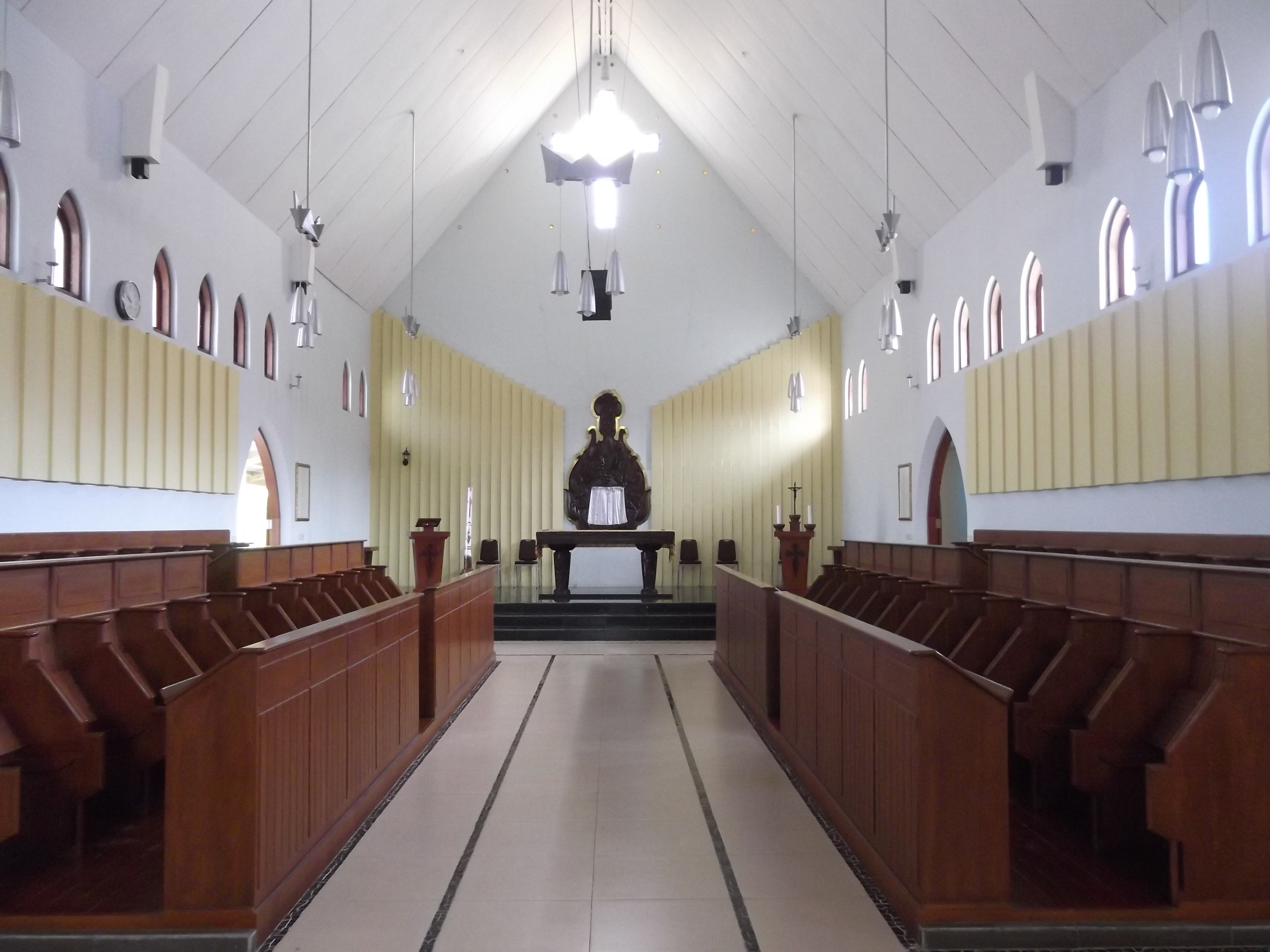
Chancel and altar inside the church.

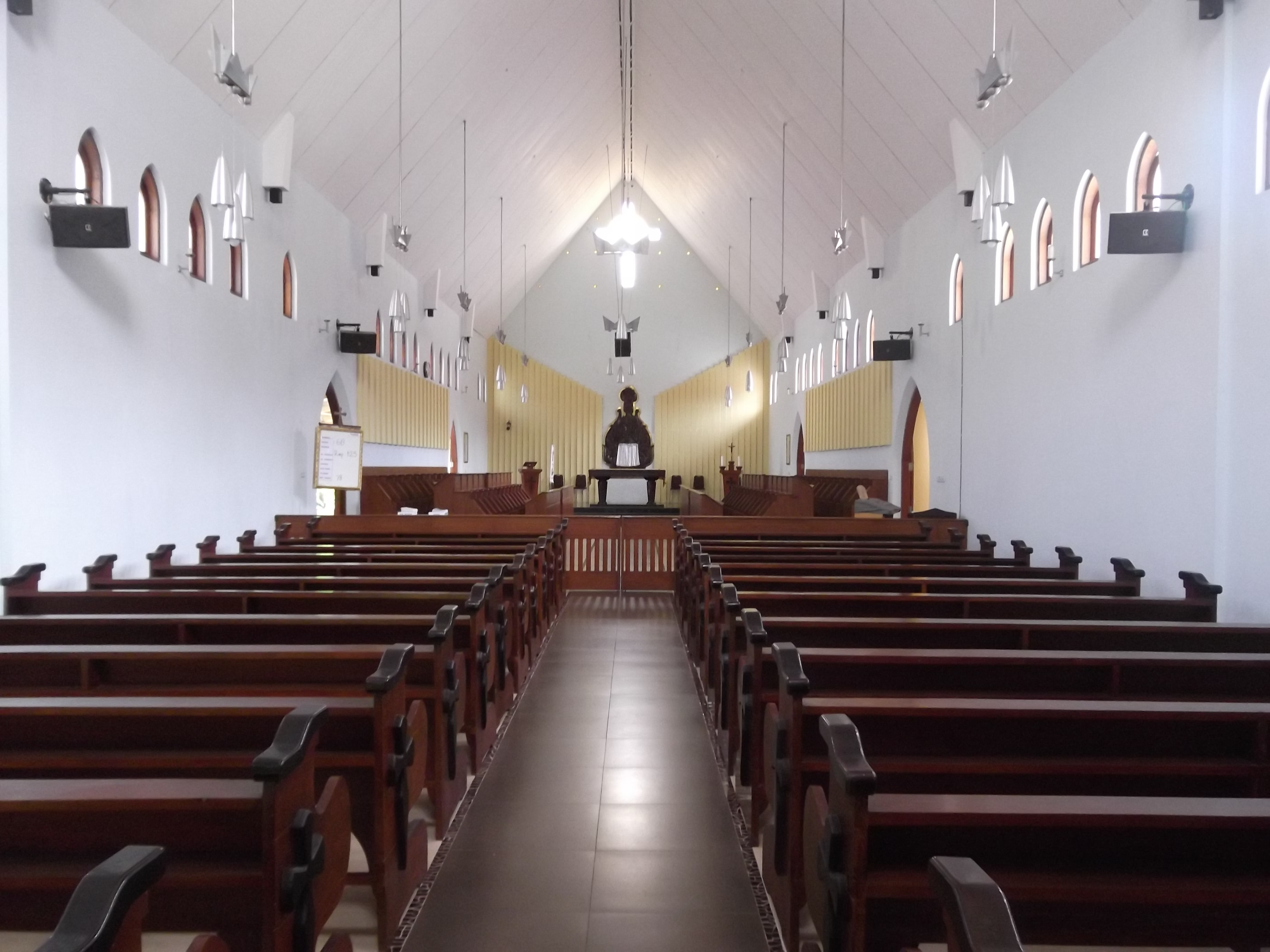
Nave of the church

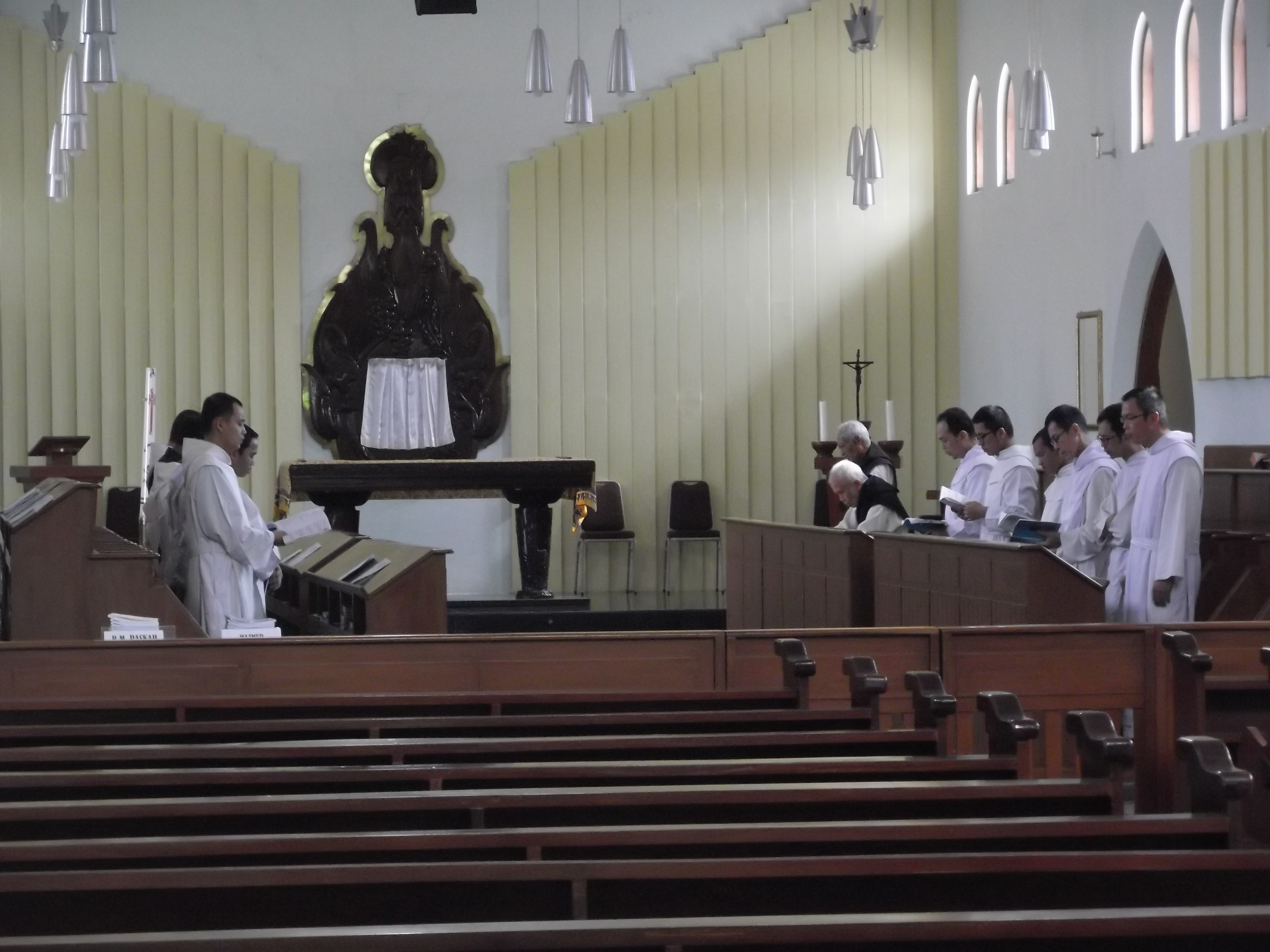
The monks celebrating Terce.

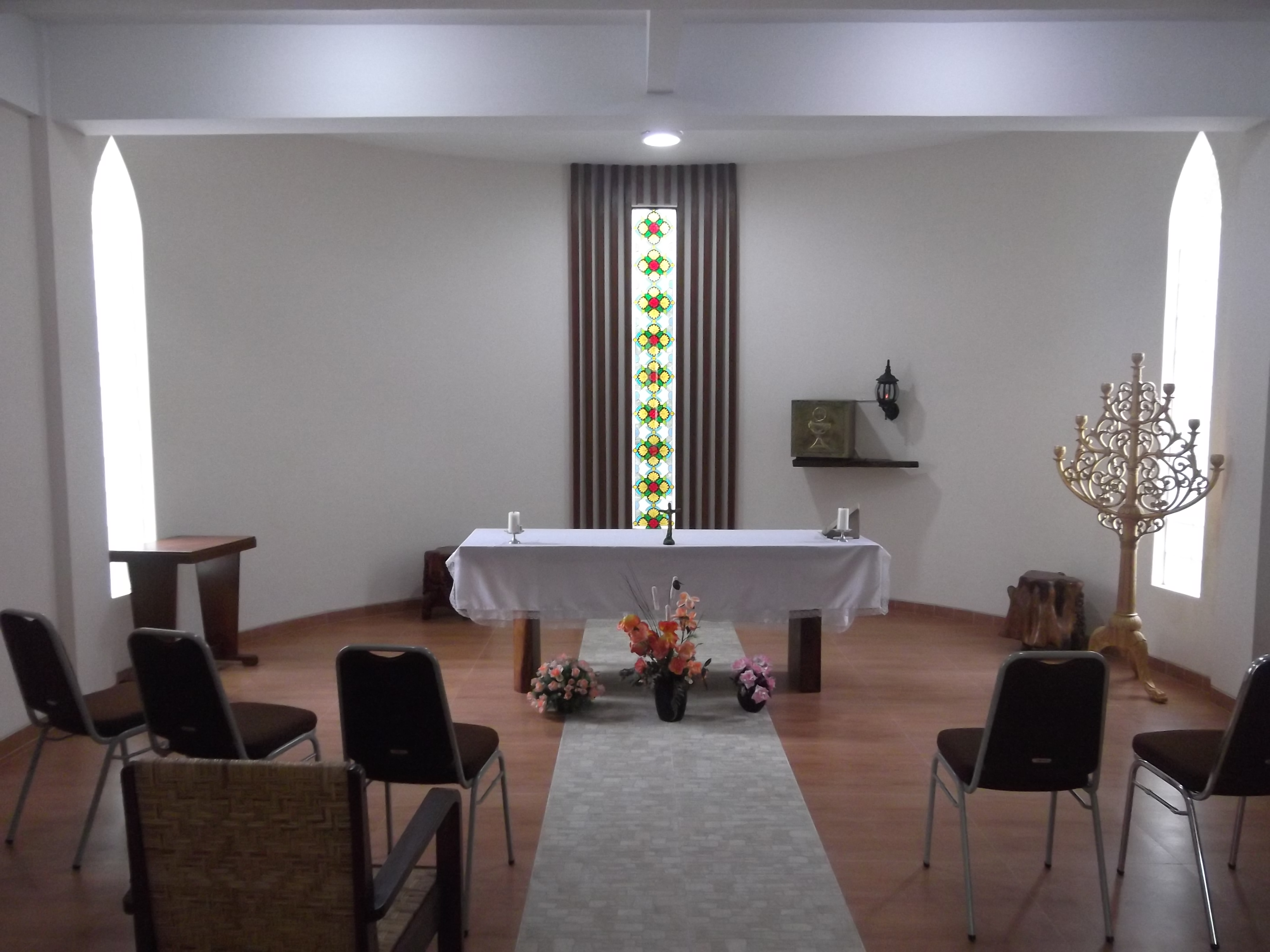
The chapel on the 1st floor of Wisma Galilea, one of the guest houses.

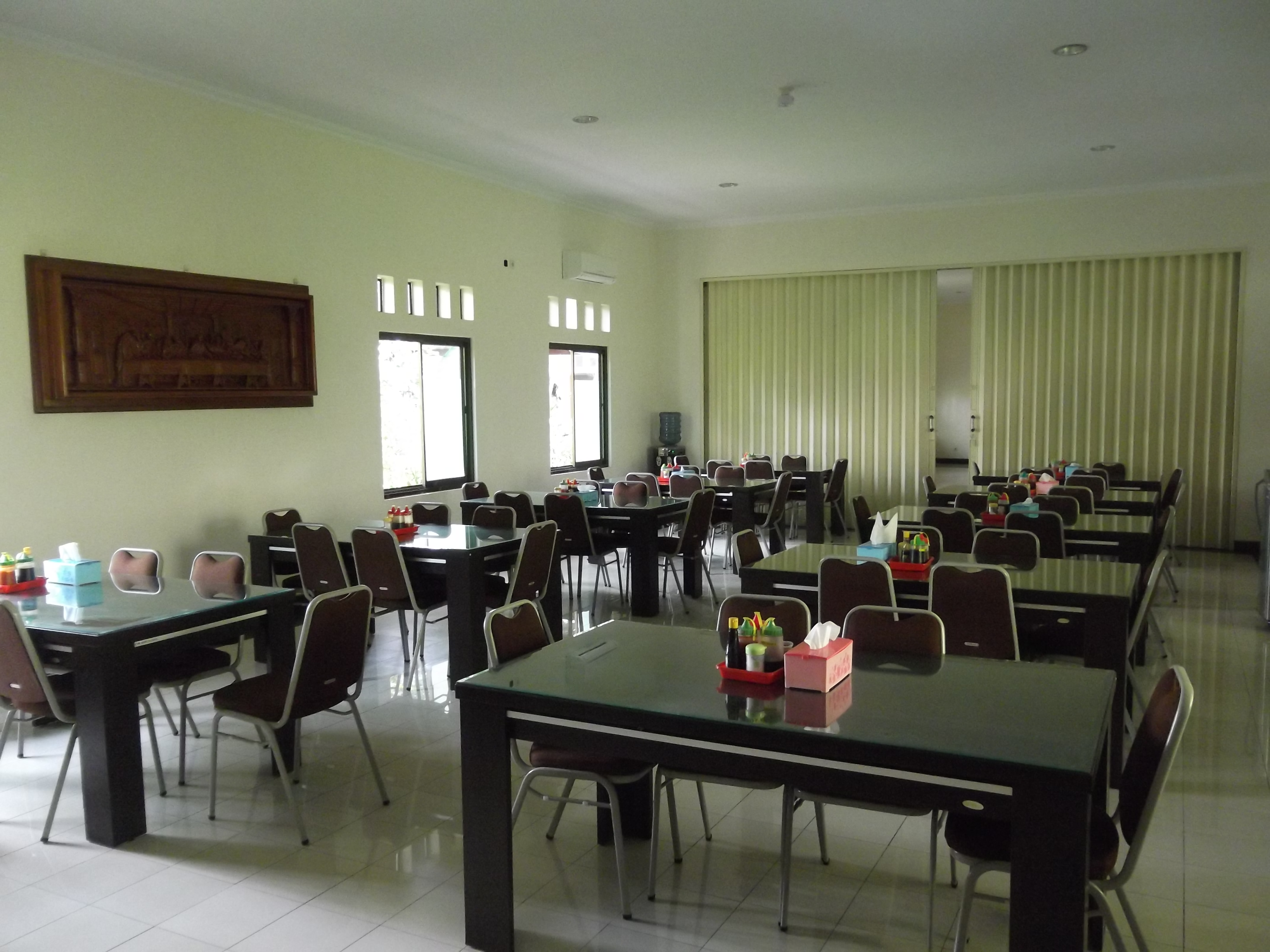
Dining room for guests.

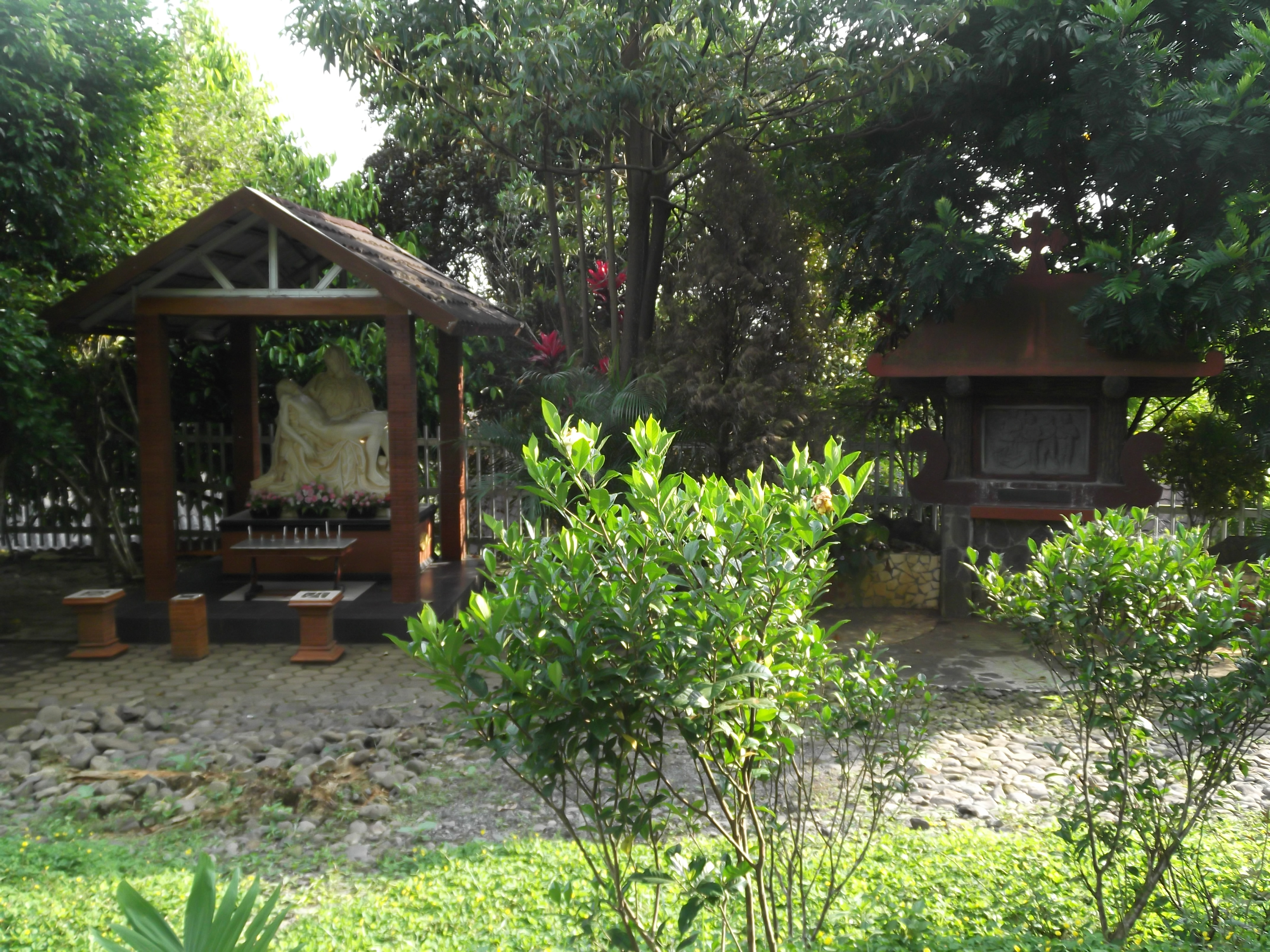
Pietà and first Station of the Cross in the Prayer Garden.

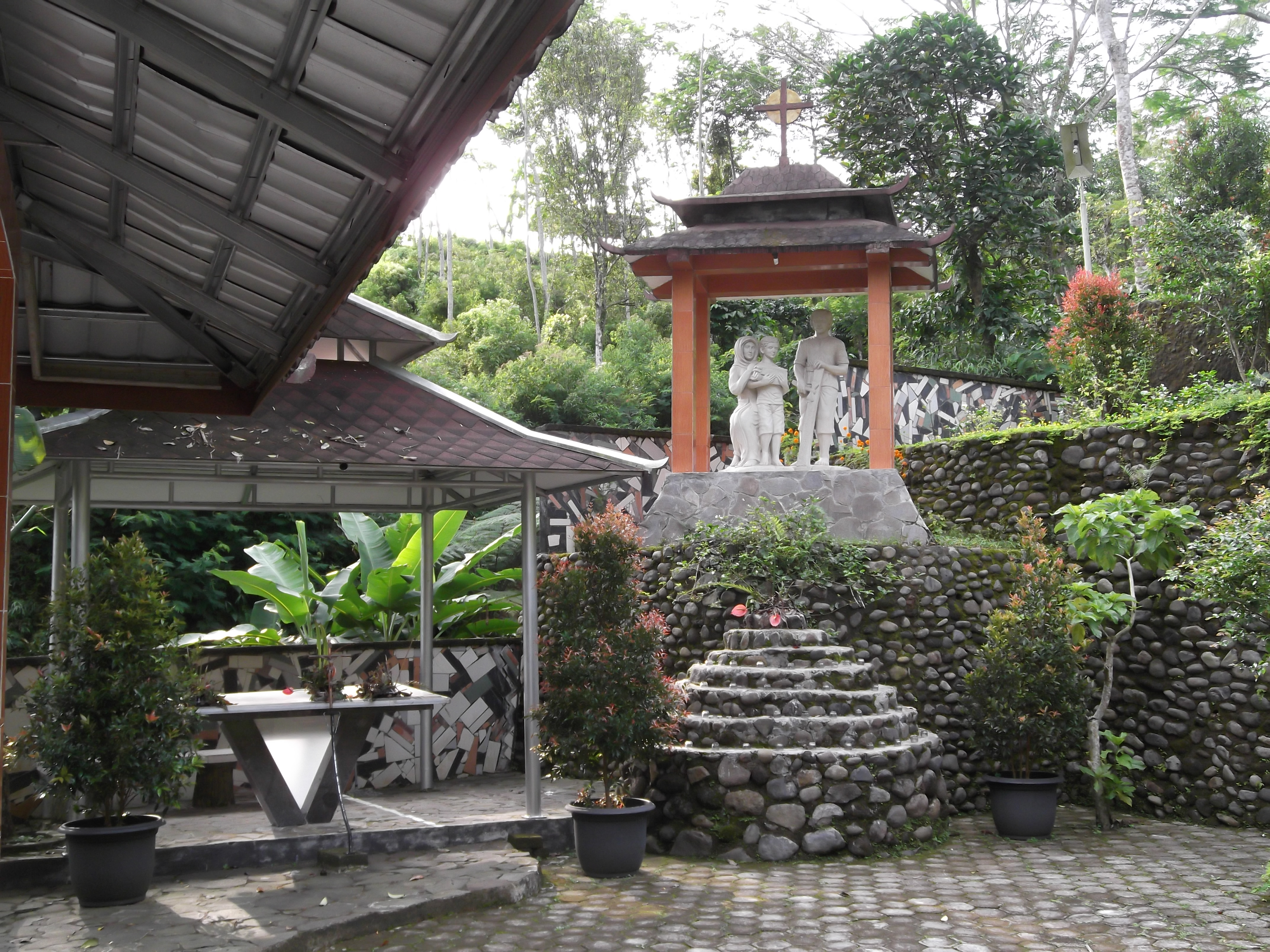
Altar and statue of the Holy Family in the Prayer Garden.

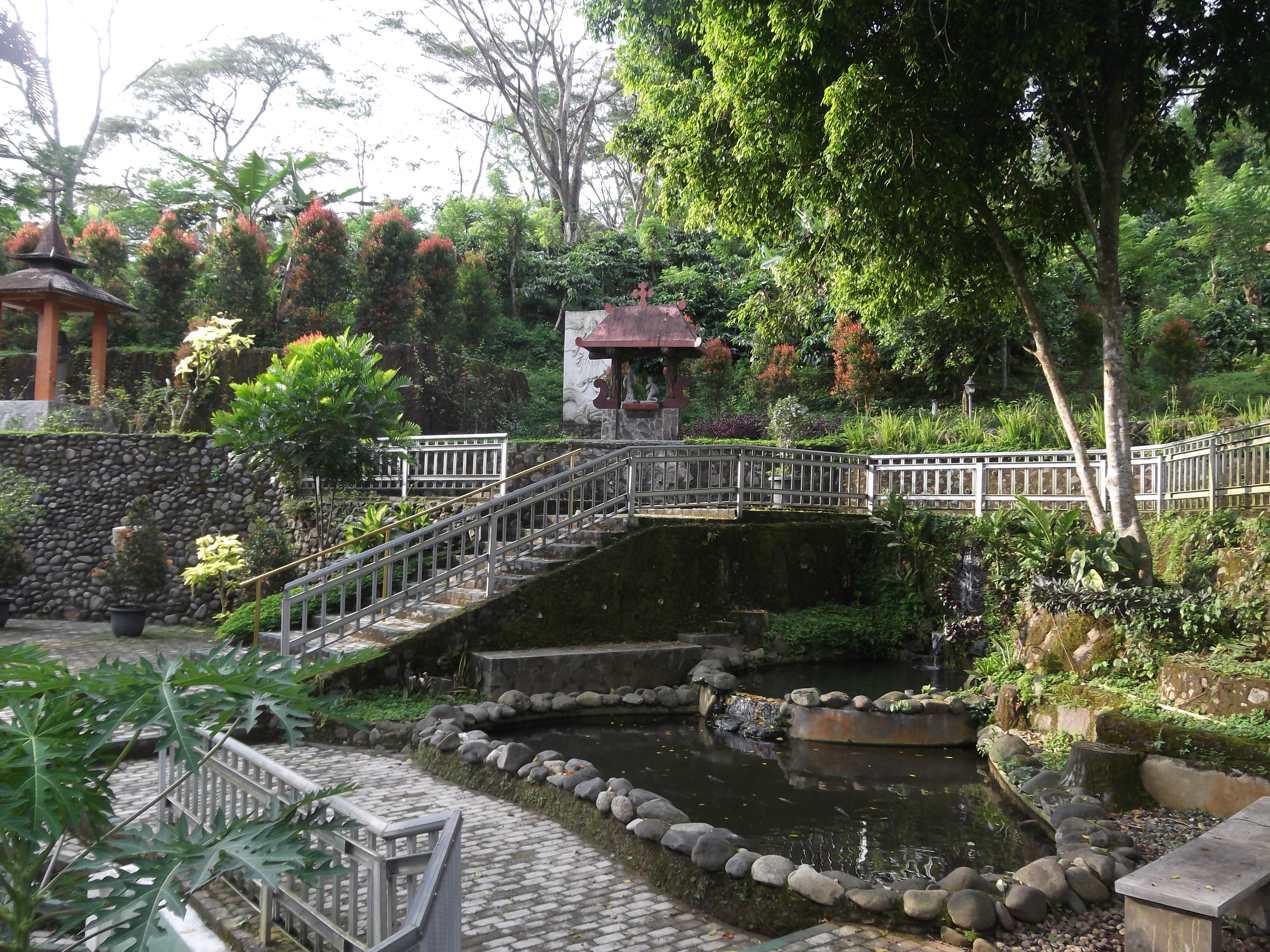
Fish pond and fountain in the Prayer Garden.

== See also ==
- Archdiocese of Semarang
- Enclosed religious orders

== Bibliography ==
- Aisyah, Nur (2004), "Bab II. Gambaran tentang Kegiatan Sosial Kemasyarakatan Santo Dominikus di Dusun Rawaseneng", Peran Sosial Kemasyarakatan Santo Dominikus di Desa Rawaseneng Kecamatan Kandangan Kabupaten Temanggung (in Indonesian), Skripsi, Semarang: Fakultas Ushuluddin IAIN Walisongo, archived from the original (PDF) on 2016-09-27
- Margarethe, Sr. (2000), "Peranan Pertapaan Trappist Santa Maria Rawaseneng terhadap Peningkatan Kesejahteraan Sosial Ekonomi Masyarakat Desa Ngempalak dan Sekitarnya", Bina Ekonomi (in Indonesian), vol. 4, Jurnal Ilmiah, Fakultas Ekonomi Universitas Katolik Parahyangan
- Mukhlis, Imam (2015), "Abstrak, Daftar Isi, Bab I, Bab V, Daftar Pustaka, Lampiran" (PDF), Dialog antar Agama - Studi Dialog Umat Beragama Pertapaan Katolik Santa Maria Rawaseneng Desa Ngemplak Kecamatan Kandangan Kabupaten Temanggung (masters) (in Indonesian), Tesis, Yogyakarta: Digital Library UIN Sunan Kalijaga
