= Koningshoeven Abbey =

Monastery in North Brabant, Netherlands

Coordinates: 51°32′37″N 5°7′47″E

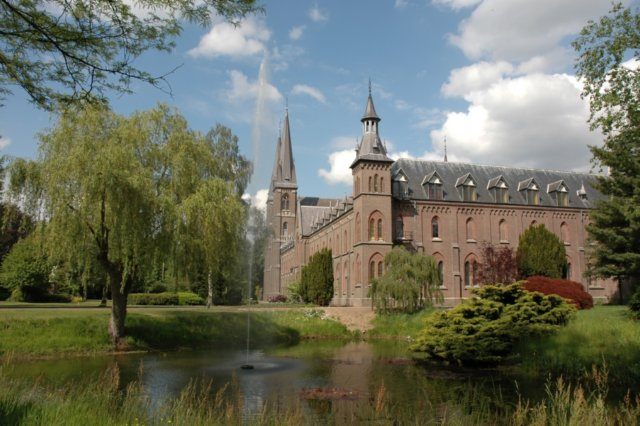
Koningshoeven Abbey

Koningshoeven Abbey (Dutch: Abdij Koningshoeven, Abdij Onze Lieve Vrouw van Koningshoeven) is a monastery of the Trappists (Order of the Cistercians of the Strict Observance) founded in 1881 in Berkel-Enschot in North Brabant, the Netherlands.

== Foundation ==
In 1880 the situation facing monastic orders in France was highly unfavourable. The monks of Mont-des-Cats Abbey (Sainte-Marie-au-Mont), near Godewaersvelde in Nord, northern France, fearing that they were about to be driven into exile, looked for a place of refuge in another country. Abbot Dominique Lacaes sent Father Sébastien Wyart, formerly an officer of the Zouaves, to the Netherlands, where he had many military contacts. Through his former lieutenant, Antoine Arts, and Father De Beer, the superior of the CMM Brothers, he made the acquaintance of the manufacturer Caspar Houben, proprietor of De Schaapskooi ("The Sheepfold"), a group of three farmsteads built by the then Crown Prince Willem in 1834 in Berkel-Enschot to the east of Tilburg. Houben was prepared to lease the properties, equipped and refurbished to the point that they were serviceable as a small and primitive monastery, to the French community. Dom Lacaes did not want at first to found a new monastery, just to find suitable temporary accommodation, but on the insistence of Father Wyart, whom in the meantime he had appointed prior, he eventually agreed on 5 March 1881.

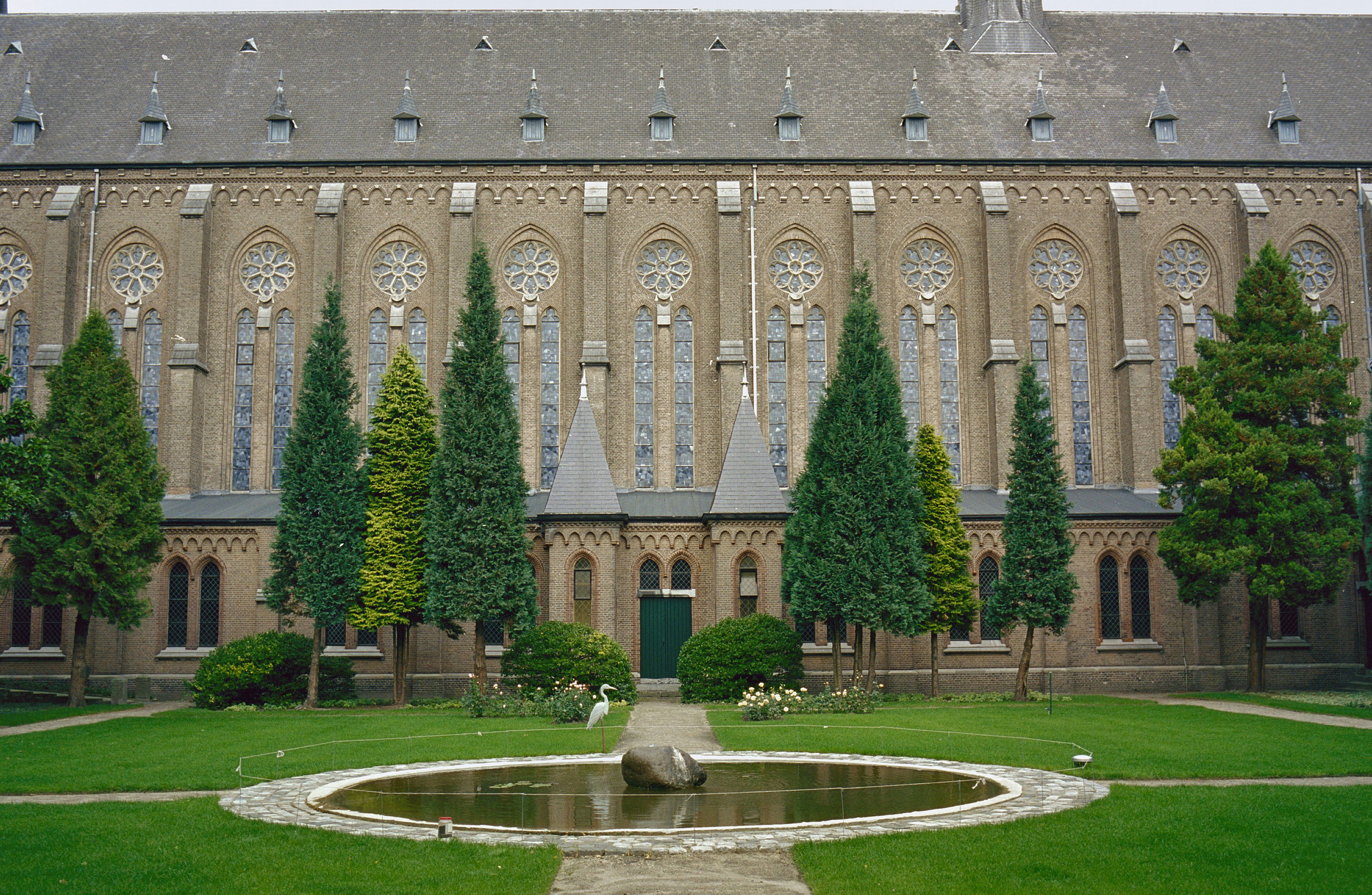
The courtyard off the monastery

In the early years things were very hard at De Schaapskooi, and without the constant help of the Tilburg Brothers the newly settled community would almost certainly have failed. A later superior, Dom Nivardus Schweykart, expanded the farm, but even that was of little help. Then, as the son of a Munich brewer, he decided in 1884 to set up a brewery. This improved the financial situation and also increased the numbers of the community.

In 1890 the first abbot of Koningshoeven was appointed, Dom Willibrordus Verbruggen. He did much for the monastery, but also brought it to the brink of ruin. Among his first acts, in 1891, was to pay off the whole of the outstanding debt of 9,000 florins to Caspar Houben. In the same year the monastery was raised to the status of an abbey, which by the end of the year housed a community of 57 people. He also began the building of a new abbey, both church and conventual buildings. The old buildings of De Schaapskooi were closed, and the name was transferred to the brewery.

== 20th century ==
Further potential financial disaster resulted from the establishment of two houses of refuge in connection with the continuing precarious position of religious communities in France: Maria Toevlucht house at Zundert (Netherlands) in 1900, and in 1902 Charneux in Belgium's Liège Province, which was wound up in 1909. All assets and possessions of Koningshoeven, Zundert and Charneux were in the name of the abbot, which led in 1909 to an awkward situation. When he refused to agree to make over the goods, the abbot of Mont des Cats received instructions from Rome to inform him that he was relieved of his abbatial rank. Dom Willibrordus did not comply, and consequently the monks of Koningshoeven, Maria Toevlucht and Charneux were evicted temporarily. Later a new abbot was appointed, the prior of Scourmont Abbey in Belgium, Father Simon Dubuisson. Dom Willibrordus was transferred to an Italian monastery where he eventually died. Father Simon achieved much, not only by paying off the great debts that Dom Willibrordus had left behind but also through his spiritual leadership. Within the Order Dom Simon was highly esteemed, and he was often asked by the Chapter General to solve problems in monasteries all over the world.

In 1931 the fiftieth anniversary of the abbey was celebrated. In 1937 at Berkel-Enschot Koningsoord Abbey was founded, the only house of Trappist nuns in the Netherlands. In 1942 three monks of Jewish descent, Ignatius, Linus and Nivardus Loeb (also written "Löb") were sent to Auschwitz, where in September 1942 Fathers Ignatius and Linus were executed by firing squad, along with Polish and Ukrainian Catholic priests, for hearing confessions. According to a camp orderly Father Ignatius spoke just before he was shot: "For the novices of Koningshoeven!" ("Voor de noviciaat van Koningshoeven!")

Abbot Simon died on 11 February 1945. For the first time a new abbot was elected in Koningshoeven: all the previous abbots had been appointed. The new abbot was Dom Willibrord van Dijk, the first Dutch superior. He had much hard work with the renewal of the life of the monastery. Whereas his predecessor had made people apprehensive, the abbot was much loved by his fellow monks, without slackening the discipline of the Rule. During his time as abbot, the abbey came into possession of the Stations of the Cross by Albert Servaes. Koningshoeven founded the Rawaseneng Monastery in Java in 1953, and in 1956 another at Kipkelion in Kericho County, Kenya. In 1966 Dom Willibrord asked to retire for health reasons. The community was not ready at that moment for the election of a new abbot and chose a temporary superior, Father Cyprianus van de Bogaard: he was elected as the fourth abbot in 1969. A native of Tilburg, he was able to bind the abbey closer to the region in which it stood. In 1981 the centenary was celebrated. Under his direction the abbey divested itself of the agricultural business. In 1989 Dom Cyprianus stood down and resumed his place in the community and the choir. Once again the community decided that it preferred a temporary superior, Father Korneel Vermeiren, a monk of Zundert Abbey. He was elected abbot six months later.

== 21st century ==
In 2004–2005 the abbey church was thoroughly renovated. Dom Korneel resigned as abbot in 2005 and was replaced by Dom Bernardus Peeters. At this point the community consisted of 16 monks.

=== Brewery ===
The brewery founded in 1884 continues in production as the De Koningshoeven Brewery.
