= Berkel-Enschot =

- Town
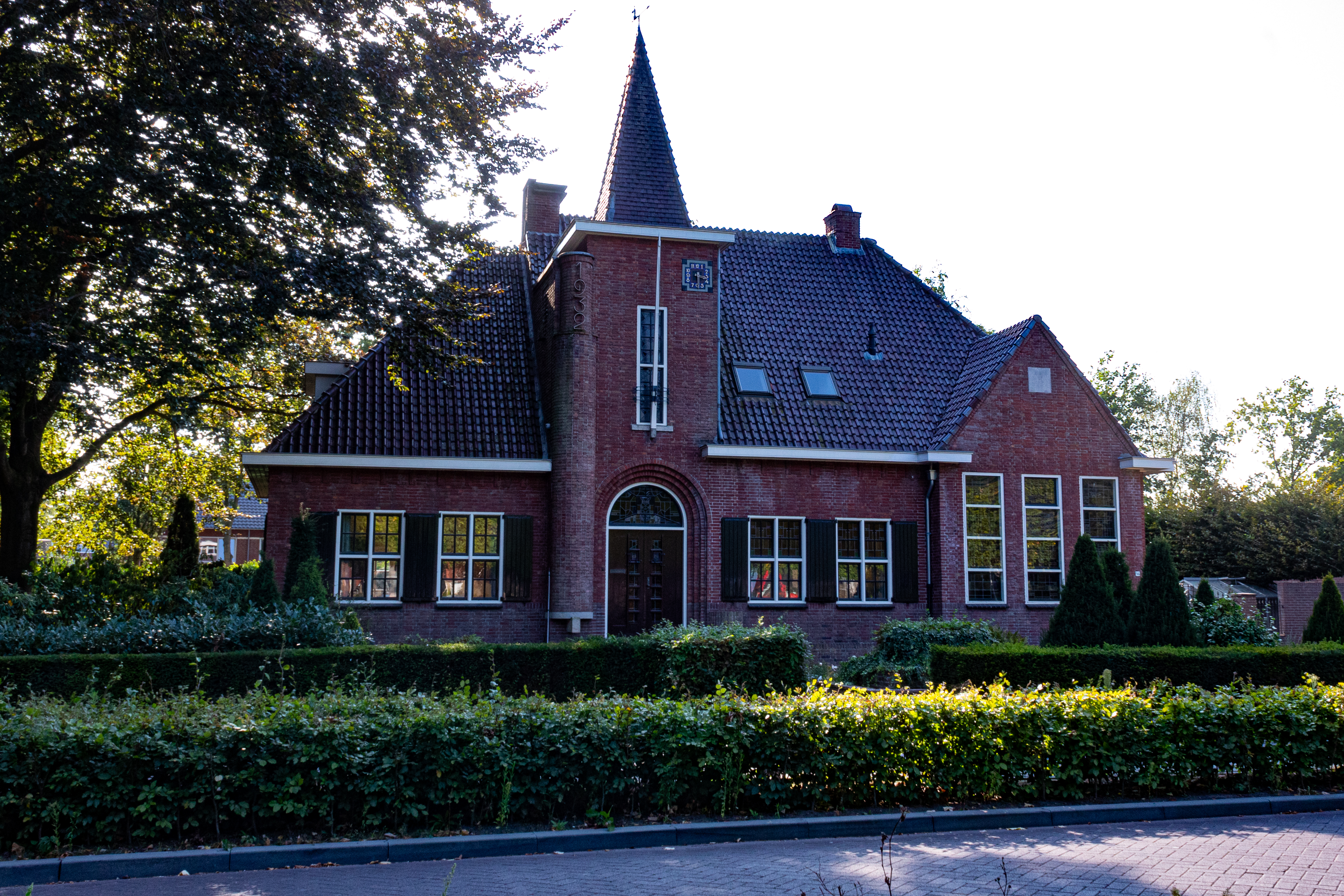
- Former town hall

- Flag Coat of arms

- Location in the province of North Brabant in the Netherlands Berkel-Enschot (Netherlands)
- Coordinates: 51°34′57″N 5°8′29″E
- Country: Netherlands
- Province: North Brabant
- Municipality: Tilburg

Area
  - Total: 11.76 km^{2} (4.54 sq mi)
- Elevation: 12 m (39 ft)

Population (2021)
  - Total: 12,755
  - Density: 1,085/km^{2} (2,809/sq mi)
- Time zone: UTC+1 (CET)
  - Summer (DST): UTC+2 (CEST)
- Postal code: 5056
- Dialing code: 013
- Major roads: N65

Berkel-Enschot is a Dutch village, located in the municipality of Tilburg in the North Brabant province which borders Belgium.

== Geography ==
Berkel-Enschot is located between Tilburg and Oisterwijk. Surrounding towns and hamlets are Brem, Heikant, Heuveltje, 't Hoekske, Hoog-Heukelom, Hoogeind, de Kraan, Laag-Heukelom, Loonse Hoek, Oisterwijkse Hoeve and Udenhout.

== History ==
The village was formed when two agricultural villages, Berkel and Enschot, eventually merged. From 1811 until 1996, together with neighboring hamlet Heukelom, the village formed an individual municipality which was split up in 1997. From that point, Berkel-Enschot became part of the municipality of Tilburg and Heukelom joined the municipality of Oisterwijk.

Although mainly an agrarian community, field ovens near the local clay pits were used to produce bricks from 1897 until 1931. One of these clay pits was eventually turned into a recreational pool, the Rauwbraken, which is still in use today. Another notable contribution to the village, facilitated by the growing brick industry, was its first rail line which ran from Tilburg to 's-Hertogenbosch. Although originally constructed to transport bricks, it allowed the village to easily transport feed for livestock as well as coal. After the Second World War, the village prospered due to the booming textile industry of Tilburg. When in 1960, the Jurgens Textile company opened a production location in the village, the number of residents again grew quickly.

== Toponymy ==
The town derives its name from the old Dutch words 'Berkeloo' and 'Ende Skied', which mean 'Birch forest' and 'Final border'.

== Main sights ==
- Koningshoeven Abbey, founded in 1881, is a Trappist abbey and one of two Dutch breweries of trappist beer.

== Gallery ==
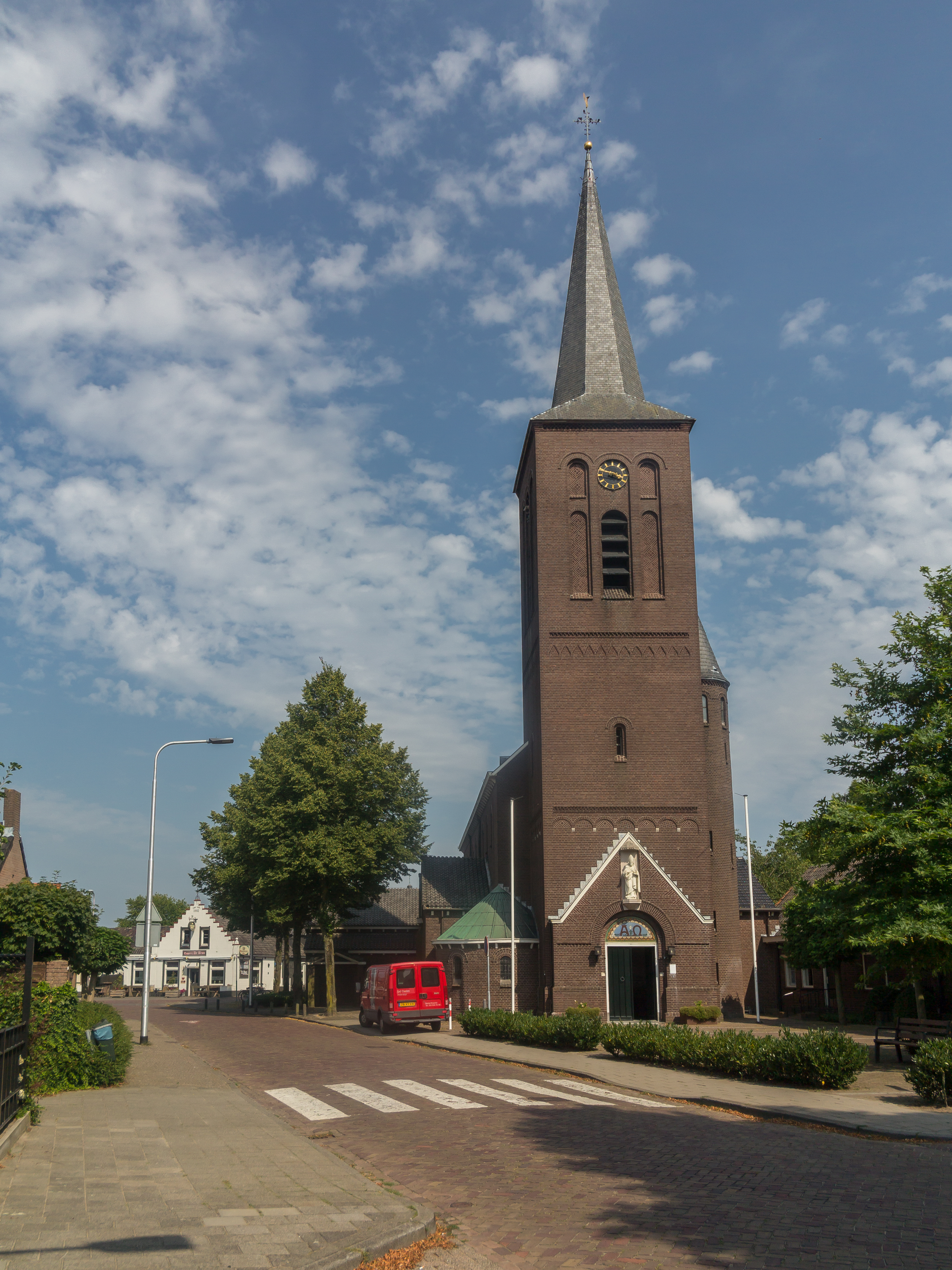
Church: de Sint Willibrorduskerk

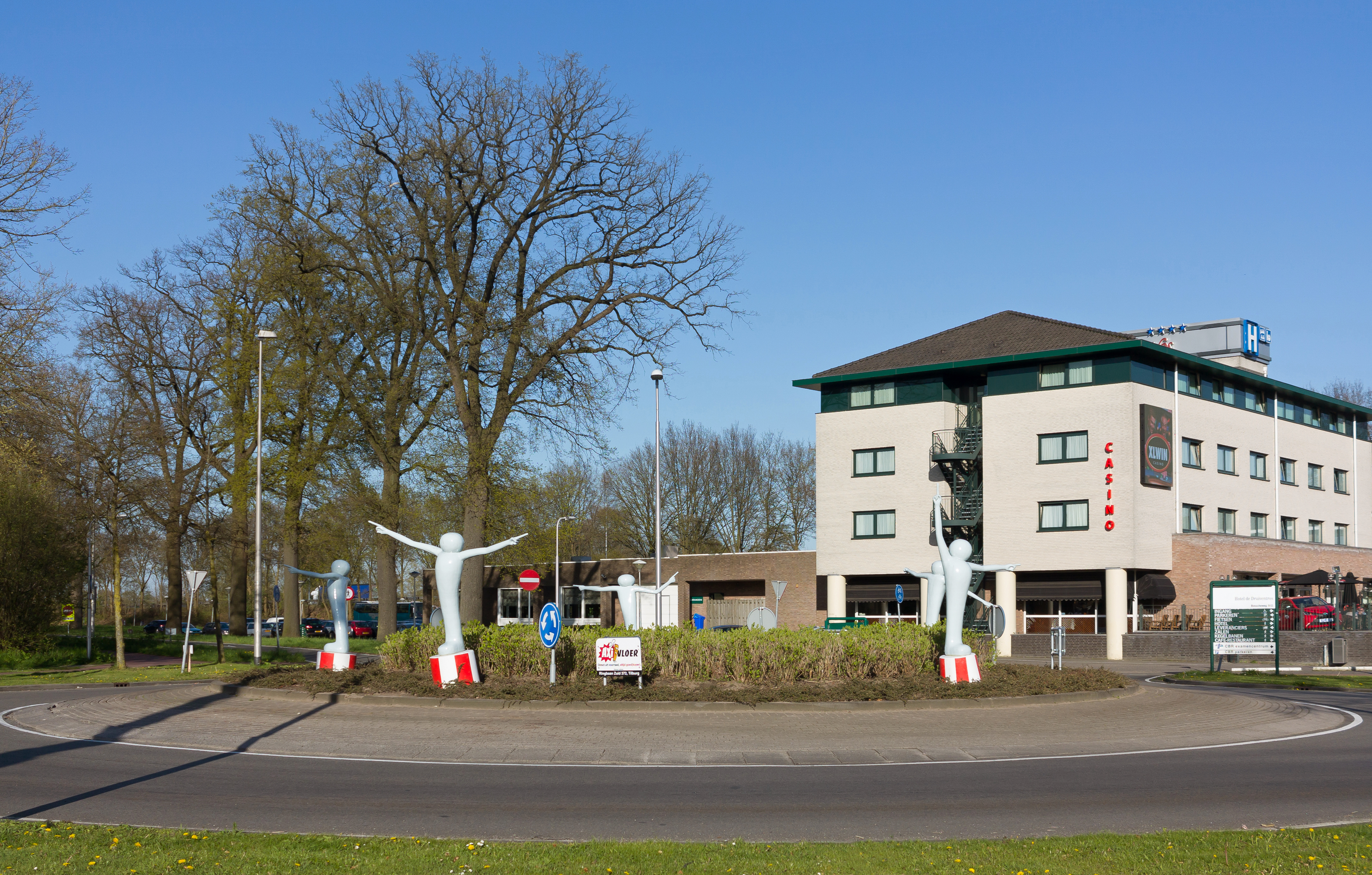
Roundabout near de Puccinilaan

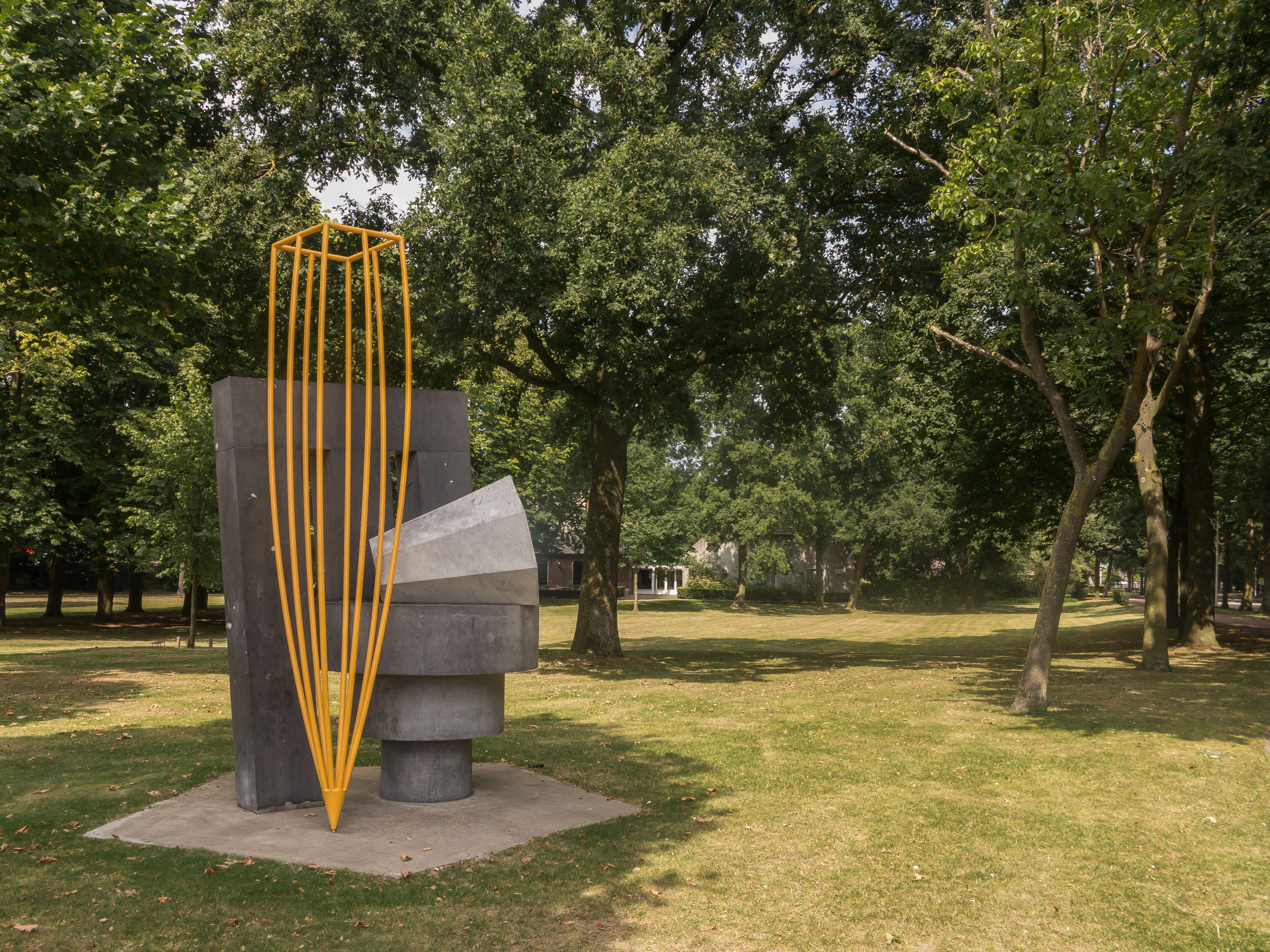
Sculpture at de Eisenhowerlaan-Durendaelweg
