= List of abbeys and priories =

List of abbeys and priories is a link list for any abbey or priory. As of 2016, the Catholic Church has 3,600 abbeys and monasteries worldwide.

== In Europe ==
=== Armenia ===
- Akhtala Monastery
- Gandzasar monastery
- Geghard
- Goshavank
- Haghartsin Monastery
- Haghpat Monastery
- Kecharis Monastery
- Khor Virap
- Noravank
- Sanahin Monastery
- Sevanavank
- Tatev Monastery

=== Austria ===
- List of Christian monasteries in Austria

=== Belgium ===
- List of Christian monasteries in Belgium

=== Czech Republic ===
- Břevnov Archabbey
- Emauzy Abbey
- Rajhrad Abbey
- Vyšší Brod Monastery

=== Denmark ===
- List of Christian monasteries in Denmark

=== Finland ===
- List of Christian monasteries in Finland

=== France ===
- List of Christian religious houses in France

=== Georgia ===
- Betania Monastery
- Bodbe Monastery
- David Gareja monastery complex
- Gelati Monastery
- Jvari (monastery)
- Shio-Mgvime Monastery

=== Germany ===
- List of Christian monasteries in Germany

=== Hungary ===
- Benedictine Abbey of Bakonybél
- Benedictine Abbey of Pécsvárad
- Benedictine Abbey of Tihany
- Benedictine Archabbey of Pannonhalma, a territorial abbacy
- Cistercian Abbey of Szentgotthárd
- Franciscan Monastery of Baja
- Majk Abbey
- Zirc Abbey

=== Ireland (Republic of Ireland) ===
- List of monastic houses in the Republic of Ireland

=== Italy ===
- Abbey of San Gerolamo, Quarto dei Mille
- Abbey of Santa Giustina, Padua
- Abbey of the Holy Spirit at Monte Morrone, Sulmona
- Abbey of the Saviour, Abbadia San Salvatore
- Badia Fiorentina, Florence
- Basilica di San Zeno Abbey, Verona
- Bobbio Abbey, Bobbio, a territorial abbacy
- Camaldoli Monastery, Poppi
- Casamari Abbey, Veroli
- Certosa di Galluzzo, Galluzzo
- Certosa di Padula, Salerno
- Certosa di Pavia, Pavia
- Cervara Abbey, Santa Margherita Ligure
- Chiaravalle Abbey, Milan
- Chiaravalle Abbey, Tolentino
- Cistercian Abbey, Albino
- Farfa Abbey, Fara Sabina, a territorial abbacy
- Fonte Avellana, Serra Sant'Abbondio
- Fossanova Abbey, Priverno
- Fruttuaria, San Benigno Canavese
- Grottaferrata Abbey, Grottaferrata, the only Italo-Albanese territorial abbacy
- Hermitage of Camaldoli, Naples
- La Trinità della Cava, Cava de' Tirreni
- Lucedio Abbey, Turin
- Marienberg Abbey, Mals
- Matris Domini Monastery, Bergamo
- Monastery of the Holy Saviour, Lecceto
- Monte Cassino, Cassino, a territorial abbacy
- Monte Oliveto Maggiore, Asciano
- Nonantola Abbey, Nonantola
- Novalesa Abbey, Val di Susa
- Pomposa Abbey, Ferrara, a territorial abbacy
- Säben Abbey, Klausen
- Sacra di San Michele, Val di Susa
- Sacro Convento, Assisi
- San Clemente Abbey, Castiglione a Casauria
- San Giorgio Monastery, Venice
- San Giovanni degli Eremiti, Palermo
- San Giovanni in Venere, Fossacesia
- San Liberatore a Maiella, Serramonacesca
- San Mercuriale, Forlì
- San Miniato al Monte, Florence
- San Pietro, Perugia, Perugia
- San Pietro in Bovara, Bovara
- San Pietro in Valle, Ferentillo
- San Salvatore, Brescia, Brescia
- San Vincenzo al Volturno, Castel San Vincenzo
- San Vittore alle Chiuse, Genga
- San Zeno (Pisa), Pisa
- Sant'Anselmo, Rome
- Sant'Antimo Abbey, Montalcino
- Abbey of Santa Lucia, Rocca di Cambio
- Santa Maria Arabona, Manopello
- Santa Maria Casanova, Villa Celiera
- Santa Maria del Carmine, Florence
- Santa Maria della Vittoria, Scurcola Marsicana
- Santi Vito e Salvo, San Salvo
- Santo Spirito d'Ocre, Ocre
- Santo Stefano, Bologna
- Santo Stefano in Manciano, Manciano
- Sassovivo Abbey, Foligno
- Staffarda Abbey, Saluzzo
- Tre Fontane Abbey, Rome
- Vallombrosa Abbey, Reggello
- Villa Magna, Anagni

=== Netherlands ===
- Berne Abbey, Heeswijk
- Egmond Abbey, Egmond-Binnen
- Koningshoeven Abbey, Berkel-Enschot
- Lilbosch Abbey, Echt
- Loosduinen Abbey, The Hague
- Middelburg Abbey, Middelburg
- Rijnsburg Abbey, Rijnsburg
- Rolduc Abbey, Kerkrade
- Ruinen Abbey, Ruinen
- Sion Abbey, Diepenveen
- Stavoren Abbey, Stavoren
- Susteren Abbey, Susteren
- Thorn Abbey, Thorn
- Ulingsheide Abbey, Tegelen
- St. Benedictusberg Abbey, Vaals
- St. Paul's Abbey, Utrecht
- St. Willibrord's Abbey, Doetinchem

=== Norway ===
- List of Christian monasteries in Norway

=== Poland ===
- Kołbacz
- Cistercians Abbey in Sulejów
- Krzeszów Abbey
- Tyniec
- Jasna Góra Monastery
- Cistercians Abbey in Wąchock

=== Portugal ===
- Jerónimos Monastery
- Batalha Monastery
- Alcobaça Monastery
- Monastery of the Holy Cross
- Monastery of São Martinho de Tibães
- Monastery of São Dinis de Odivelas

=== Russia ===
- Troitse-Sergiyeva Lavra
- Chudov Monastery
- Simonov Monastery
- Novospassky Monastery
- Novodevichy Convent
- Borisoglebsky Monastery
- Ferapontov Monastery
- Kirillo-Belozersky Monastery
- Solovetsky Monastery
- Khutyn Monastery
- Ipatiev Monastery
- Valaam Monastery
- Danilov Monastery
- Andronikov Monastery
- Alexander Nevsky Monastery
- Marfo-Mariinsky Convent

=== Serbia ===
- See List of Serbian Orthodox monasteries

=== Spain ===
- Lluc Sanctuary, Mallorca
- Monasterio de Piedra, Province of Zaragoza
- Nuestra Señora de Rueda Monastery, Province of Zaragoza
- San Salvador of Leyre Abbey, Navarre
- Santa María de El Paular Monastery, Community of Madrid
- Santa María de Montserrat Abbey, Province of Barcelona
- Santa María de Moreruela Abbey, Province of Zamora
- Santa María de Poblet Monastery, Province of Tarragona
- Santa María de Vallbona Monastery, Province of Lleida
- Santa María la Real de Fitero Monastery, Navarre
- Santa María la Real de Las Huelgas Monastery, Province of Burgos
- Santo Domingo de Silos Abbey, Province of Burgos
- Suso Monastery, San Millán de la Cogolla, La Rioja
- Yuso Monastery, San Millán de la Cogolla, La Rioja

=== Sweden ===
- List of Catholic monasteries and convents in Sweden

=== Switzerland ===
- List of Christian monasteries in Switzerland

=== United Kingdom ===
- List of monastic houses in England
- List of monastic houses on the Isle of Man
- List of monastic houses in Northern Ireland
- List of monastic houses in Scotland
- List of monastic houses in Wales

== In Asia ==
=== Australia ===
- See List of monasteries in Australia

=== China and Hong Kong ===
- Yenki Abbey, Yanji (Yenki)
- Our Lady of Joy Abbey (Trappist Haven Monastery), Lantau Island, New Territories, Hong Kong

=== India ===
- St Michael's Priory, Kumily

=== Indonesia ===
- Rawaseneng Monastery, Temanggung
- Bunda Pemersatu Monastery, Gedono, Semarang
- Lamanabi Trappist Monastery, East Flores

=== North Korea ===
- St Benedict's Territorial Abbey, Tokwon

=== Philippines ===
- St Benedict's Conventual Priory, Digos
- Our Lady of Montserrat Abbey, Manila
- Abbey of the Transfiguration, Malaybalay
- Our Lady of the Philippines Abbey, Guimaras

=== South Korea ===
- St Bernardo Tolomei Abbey, Goseong
- St Maurus and St Placidus Abbey, Waegwan

=== Syria ===
- List of monasteries in Syria

==== Orthodox ====
- Greek
  - Holy Transfiguration Monastery, Kferam, Homs
  - St. Elias (Deir Mar Elias), Sednaya
  - Mar Sarkis, Maaloula
- Syriac
  - Holy Transfiguration Monastery, Kferam, Homs

== In the Americas ==
=== Argentina ===
- Abadía de Cristo Rey, Tucumán
- Monasterio Benedictino Santa María, Los Toldos
- Abadía de San Benito, Luján
- Abadía del Niño Dios, Victoria

=== Canada ===
- Saint Benedict Abbey, Quebec, Saint-Benoît-du-Lac, Quebec
- Abbey of Notre-Dame du Lac (Oka, Quebec)
- Ursulines of Quebec
- Canonesses of St. Augustine of the Mercy of Jesus
- Westminster Abbey, Mission, BC

=== United States ===
- Abbey of New Clairvaux, Vina, California
- Abbey of Our Lady of Gethsemani, Bardstown, Kentucky
- Abbey of Regina Laudis, Bethlehem, Connecticut
- Assumption Abbey, Richardton, North Dakota
- Belmont Abbey, Belmont, North Carolina
- Blue Cloud Abbey, Marvin, South Dakota
- Charterhouse of the Transfiguration, located on Mt. Equinox, outside Arlington, Vermont
- Christ the King Priory, Schuyler, Nebraska
- Conception Abbey, Conception, Missouri
- Daylesford Abbey, Paoli, Pennsylvania
- Dominican House of Studies, Washington, D.C.
- Georgetown Visitation Monastery, Washington, D.C.
- Marmion Abbey, Aurora, Illinois
- Mepkin Abbey, Moncks Corner, South Carolina
- Monastery of Christ in the Desert, Abiquiú, New Mexico
- Monastery of Our Lady of the Annunciation of Clear Creek, Hulbert, Oklahoma
- Monastery of the Holy Spirit, Conyers, Georgia
- Monks of Mary, Sprague, Washington
- Mount Angel Abbey, Saint Benedict, Oregon
- Mount Michael Abbey, suburban Omaha, Nebraska
- Mount Saviour Monastery, Elmira, New York
- New Melleray Abbey, near Dubuque, Iowa.
- Our Lady of Dallas Abbey, Dallas, Texas
- Portsmouth Abbey, Portsmouth, Rhode Island
- Saint Anselm's Abbey, Washington, D.C.
- Saint Anselm Abbey, Goffstown, New Hampshire
- Saint Benedict Abbey, Still River, Massachusetts
- St. Bernard Abbey, Cullman, Alabama
- Saint Benedict's Abbey, Atchison, Kansas
- Saint Gregory's Abbey, Shawnee, Oklahoma
- Saint Gregory's Abbey, Three Rivers, Michigan
- Saint John's Abbey, Collegeville, Minnesota
- St. Joseph Abbey, Louisiana, Saint Benedict, Louisiana
- St. Joseph's Abbey, Massachusetts, Spencer, Massachusetts
- Saint Leo Abbey, Saint Leo, Florida
- Saint Louis Abbey, St. Louis, Missouri
- Saint Meinrad Archabbey, Spencer County, Indiana
- St. Michael's Abbey, Silverado, California
- St. Paul's Abbey, Newton, New Jersey
- Saint Vincent Archabbey, Latrobe, Pennsylvania
- Subiaco Abbey and Academy, Subiaco, Arkansas

=== Venezuela ===
- St Joseph's Abbey, Güigüe

== In Africa ==
=== Benin ===
- Mont Tabor de Hékanmè, Attogon

=== Burkina Faso ===
- Abbaye Saint-Benoît de Koubri, Koubri Department

=== Democratic Republic of the Congo ===
- Monastery of St Odile, Malandji
- Monastère Notre-Dame-des-Sources, Lubumbashi

=== Ivory Coast ===
- Monastère Bénédictin Sainte-Marie, Bouaké

=== Kenya ===
- Prince of Peace Conventual Priory, Tigoni

=== Senegal ===
- Abbaye de Keur Moussa, Dakar

=== South Africa ===
- Sacred Heart Abbey, Inkamana
- St Benedict's Abbey, Pietersburg

=== Tanzania ===
- St Maurus and St Placidus Abbey, Hanga
- Our Lady Help of Christians Abbey, Ndanda

=== Togo ===
- Incarnation Conventual Priory, Agbang
- Abbaye de l'Ascension, Dzogbégan

=== Uganda ===
- Christ the King Priory, Tororo

== Fictional abbeys ==
- Redwall Abbey

== See also ==
- Territorial Abbacy
- List of Catholic dioceses (alphabetical), with links to many related lists
- Lists of Christian monasteries
- Lists of Christian buildings and structures
- Index: Lists of buildings and structures
