= Ecclesiastical province =

Type of territorial division within Christian churches

An ecclesiastical province is one of the basic forms of jurisdiction in Christian churches, including those of both Western Christianity and Eastern Christianity, that have traditional hierarchical structures. An ecclesiastical province consists of several dioceses (or eparchies), one of them being the archdiocese (or archeparchy), headed by a metropolitan bishop or archbishop who has ecclesiastical jurisdiction over all other bishops of the province.

In the Greco-Roman world, ecclesia (Ancient Greek: ἐκκλησία; Latin: ecclesia) was used to refer to a lawful assembly, or a called legislative body. As early as Pythagoras, the word took on the additional meaning of a community with shared beliefs. This is the meaning taken in the Greek translation of the Hebrew Scriptures (the Septuagint), and later adopted by the Christian community to refer to the assembly of believers.

In the history of Western world (sometimes more precisely as Greco-Roman world) adopted by the Roman Empire and the Byzantine Empire, Christian ecclesiastical provinces were named by analogy with the secular Roman province as well as certain extraterritorial formations of the western world in early medieval times (see Early Middle Ages). The administrative seat of each province is an episcopal see. In hierarchical Christian churches that have dioceses, a province is a collection of those dioceses (as a basic unit of administration).

Over the years certain provinces adopted the status of metropolis and have a certain degree of self-rule. A bishop of such province is called the metropolitan bishop or metropolitan. The Catholic Church (both Latin and Eastern Catholic), the Orthodox Churches and the Anglican Communion all have provinces. These provinces are led by a metropolitan archbishop.

== Early history ==
Ecclesiastical provinces first corresponded to the civil provinces of the Roman Empire. From the second half of the 2nd century, the bishops of these provinces were accustomed to assemble on important occasions for common counsel in synods. From the end of that century the summons to attend these increasingly important synods was usually issued by the bishop of the capital or metropolis of the province, who also presided over the assembly, especially in the East. Important communications were also forwarded to the bishop of the provincial capital to be brought to the notice of the other bishops. Thus in the East during the 3rd century the bishop of the provincial metropolis came gradually to occupy a certain superior position, and received the name of metropolitan.

At the First Council of Nicaea (325) this position of the metropolitan was taken for granted, and was made the basis for conceding to him definite rights over the other bishops and dioceses of the state province. In Eastern canon law since the 4th century (cf. also the Synod of Antioch of 341, can. ix), it was a principle that every civil province was likewise a church province under the supreme direction of the metropolitan, i.e. of the bishop of the provincial capital.

This division into ecclesiastical provinces did not develop so early in the Western Empire. In North Africa the first metropolitan appears during the 4th century, the Bishop of Carthage being recognized as primate of the dioceses of Northern Africa; metropolitans of the separate provinces gradually appear, although the boundaries of these provinces did not coincide with the divisions of the empire. A similar development was witnessed in Spain, Gaul, and Italy. The migration of the nations, however, prevented an equally stable formation of ecclesiastical provinces in the Christian West as in the East. It was only after the 5th century that such gradually developed, mostly in accordance with the ancient divisions of the Roman Empire. In Italy alone, on account of the central ecclesiastical position of Rome, this development was slower. However, at the end of antiquity the existence of church provinces as the basis of ecclesiastical administration was fairly universal in the West. In the Carolingian period they were reorganized, and have retained their place ever since.

== Provincial church organisation ==
=== Catholic Church ===
==== In general ====
In the Catholic Church, a province consists of a metropolitan archdiocese and one or more (1–13) suffragan dioceses headed by diocesan bishops or territorial prelatures, apostolic vicariates and missions sui iuris. The archbishop of the metropolitan see is the metropolitan of the province. The delimitation of church provinces in the Latin Church is reserved to the Holy See.

There are exceptions to these rules:

- A few dioceses are not part of any province. Their bishops are exempt from the authority of a metropolitan archbishop, instead reporting directly to the pope. For example, the bishop of the Diocese of Oslo in Norway.
- A few archdioceses do not belong to provinces and contain no suffragan dioceses. For example, the Archdiocese of Strasbourg in France is not part of a province and has no diocesan bishops reporting to its archbishop.
- Not all archdioceses are metropolitan sees. Five archdioceses are exempt: Latin Patriarchate of Jerusalem; Metropolitan Archdiocese of Udine; Metropolitan Archdiocese of Saint Boniface; Metropolitan Archdiocese of Izmir and Metropolitan Archdiocese of Corfu–Zakynthos–Kefalonia, whose leaders report directly to the pope. Other non-metropolitan archdioceses, in contrast, are not exempt. Their archbishops report directly to metropolitan archbishops.

The authority of a Latin Church metropolitan over the other sees within his province is now very limited. During a vacancy in a suffragan diocese, the metropolitan names a temporary diocesan administrator if the college of Consultors of the diocese fails to elect one within the prescribed period. A metropolitan generally presides at the installation and consecration of a new bishop in the province. The tribunal of the metropolitan see generally serves as the first court of appeal regarding canonical matters of provincial diocesan tribunals. The metropolitan's insignia is the pallium. The article in the Catholic Encyclopedia of 1911 on metropolitan shows that the metropolitan then had scarcely any more power than now.

In the Eastern Catholic Churches, the patriarchal or major archiepiscopal Churches may also be divided into ecclesial provinces, each headed by a metropolitan. The Ukrainian Greek Catholic Church has several, two of them in the United States and Canada. Some other Eastern Catholic Churches of a lower category and generally less populous, are known as metropolitanates. They are headed by a single metropolitan, the hierarch of a fixed episcopal see, As head of an autonomous Church, his name is mentioned in the liturgy of that Church immediately after that of the Pope and, in suffragan eparchies, ahead of that of the local hierarch.

==== Provincial boundary lines ====
The borders of provinces have often been inspired, or even determined, by historical or present political borders; the same is often true of diocesan borders within a province. The following are some examples:

- In France, where the boundaries partly reflected later Roman provinces, most were rearranged in 2002 to fit new administrative regions.
- A comparable process to that of France occurred earlier in Spain.
- In southern Germany, the diocesan boundaries follow the political boundaries that existed between 1815 and 1945.
- In Ireland, the four ecclesiastical provinces fixed by the Synod of Kells in 1152 reflected the contemporary boundaries of the secular provinces, but the ecclesiastical provinces and dioceses do not coincide with the present civil province and county borders. Since the Partition of Ireland in 1920–1922 six dioceses in the province of Armagh straddle the international border between the Republic of Ireland and Northern Ireland, which is part of the United Kingdom.
- In Scotland, the dioceses, and subsequently the two provinces, follow both civil and geographical boundaries such as rivers.
- In geographically large nations with a sizeable Catholic population, such as the United States, ecclesiastical provinces typically follow state lines, with less populous states being grouped into provinces. In the United States, there are five exceptions:
  - California has two metropolitan archdioceses and provinces: Los Angeles and San Francisco.
  - Texas has two metropolitan archdioceses and provinces: Galveston-Houston and San Antonio.
  - Maryland is unusual in that fourteen of its 23 counties belong to dioceses whose see cities are outside Maryland: (1) the nine counties of Maryland's Eastern Shore (Delmarva Peninsula) are part of the Diocese of Wilmington, Delaware, and (2) the five counties adjacent to the District of Columbia and in southern Maryland are part of the Archdiocese of Washington, which is a different province. Only the remaining nine counties and the City of Baltimore are part of the Archdiocese of Baltimore.
  - Fishers Island, a part of Suffolk County, New York, and north of Long Island, is part of the Diocese of Norwich, Connecticut, which is in a different province.
  - Those parts of Idaho and Montana that are within Yellowstone National Park are part of the Diocese of Cheyenne, Wyoming, which is in a different province.

In addition, the Diocese of Gallup (New Mexico) contains two Arizona counties—Apache County and Navajo County—and part of a third county, i.e., those parts of the Navajo and Hopi reservations that are in Coconino County (Arizona). New Mexico and Arizona, however, together form one province.

- Many countries contain more than one province, except those with a small population or few Catholics.
- In at least one case, a province contains dioceses that are in more than one nation, e.g., the Province of Samoa-Apia, of which the metropolitan see (the Archdiocese of Samoa-Apia) is in the Independent State of Samoa, and its only suffragan see (the Diocese of Samoa-Pago Pago) is in American Samoa (an unincorporated territory of the United States). Even individual dioceses, let alone ecclesiastical provinces, can comprise more than one state: examples are San Marino-Montefeltro (San Marino and part of Italy), Urgell (Andorra and part of Spain), and the Diocese of Rome itself (Vatican City and part of Italy).

=== Eastern Orthodox Church ===
Historical development of ecclesiastical provinces in the Eastern Orthodox Church was influenced by strong tendencies of internal administrative centralization. Since the First Ecumenical Council (325), the Archbishop of Alexandria was given supreme jurisdiction over all provinces of Egypt. Similar authority was also granted to Archbishop of Antioch regarding jurisdiction over provinces of Orient. Since the Fourth Ecumenical Council (451), Patriarch of Constantinople was given the right to consecrate metropolitan bishops in all regions that were placed under his supreme jurisdiction. In time, previous administrative autonomy of original ecclesiastical provinces was gradually and systematically reduced in favor of patriarchal centralization. Ancient practice of annual councils of provincial bishops, headed by their local metropolitans, was also abandoned in favor of centralized councils, headed by patriarchs and attended by metropolitan bishops.

The creation of new autonomous and autocephalous jurisdictions was also marked by tendencies of internal centralization. The newly created Archbishopric of Ohrid (1018) was structured as a single ecclesiastical province, headed by an archbishop who had jurisdiction over all of his suffragan bishops. In 1219, autocephalous Serbian Orthodox Church was also organized as one ecclesiastical province, headed by an archbishop with direct jurisdiction over all Serbian bishops. By the end of Middle Ages, each autocephalous and autonomous church in Eastern Orthodoxy was functioning as a single, internally integrated ecclesiastical province, headed by a local patriarch or archbishop.

Only in modern times, some Eastern Orthodox Churches have revived the ancient practice by creating internal ecclesiastical provinces on the middle (regional) level of church administration. In the Romanian Orthodox Church there are six regional metropolitanates, headed by local metropolitans who preside over regional synods of local bishops, and have special duties and privileges. For example, the Metropolitan of Oltenia has regional jurisdiction over four local dioceses. On the other hand, a majority of Eastern Orthodox Churches remain and function as highly centralized church bodies, each of them functioning as a single ecclesiastical province.

=== Protestantism ===
==== Anglican Communion ====
Member churches of the Anglican Communion are often referred to as provinces. Some provinces are coterminous with the boundaries of political states, some include multiple nations while others include only parts of a nation. Some, such as the Church of the Province of West Africa, have the word "province" in their names. These member churches are known as "provinces of the Anglican Communion", and are headed by a primate, who is usually also styled archbishop, but may have an alternative title such as primus (for example, the Primus of the Scottish Episcopal Church), presiding bishop, or moderator.

The word is also used to refer to a grouping of dioceses within a member church, commonly known as a metropolitical province, metropolitan province, or internal province. The Church of England is divided into two such provinces: Canterbury and York. The Anglican Church of Australia has five provinces: New South Wales, Queensland, South Australia, Victoria and Western Australia, and an extraprovincial diocese of Tasmania. The Anglican Church of Canada has four: British Columbia and Yukon, Canada, Ontario, and the Northern Lights. The Church of Ireland has two: Armagh and Dublin. The Episcopal Church in the United States of America (ECUSA) numbers, rather than names, its nine provinces. In all cases apart from ECUSA each metropolitan or internal province is headed by a metropolitan bishop with the title archbishop.

==== Evangelical State Church in Prussia ====
The Evangelical State Church in Prussia, formed in 1821 (renamed: Evangelical State Church in Prussia's older Provinces in 1875, Evangelical Church of the old-Prussian Union in 1922), had ecclesiastical provinces (Kirchenprovinzen) as administrative subsections mostly following the boundaries of those political Provinces of Prussia which formed part of the state before 1866, with some border changes after 1920 following WWI territorial cessions.

Name	Congregations comprised were located in	Seat	Leading bodies (legislation, executive) and persons	Status as eccl. province	Successor organisation
Ecclesiastical Province of Brandenburg (1821–1926); German: Kirchenprovinz Brandenburg; Ecclesiastical Province of the March of Brandenburg (1926–1948); German: Kirchenprovinz Mark Brandenburg	Province of Brandenburg and Berlin (politically separate since 1881)	Berlin, Züllichau (1944–1945)	provincial synod (Provinzialsynode), consistory, 1829–1933: general superintendents for (1) Berlin inner city, (2) Berlin suburbia (1911–1933), (3) Kurmark and (4) Lusatia and New March; 1933–1935: provincial bishops of Berlin and of Brandenburg, provosts of Kurmark and of New March-Lower Lusatia	1821–1948	Evangelical Church in Berlin-Brandenburg
Regional Synodal Federation of the Free City of Danzig; German: Landessynodalverband der Freien Stadt Danzig	Free City of Danzig	Danzig	regional synod (Landessynode), consistory, 1922-1933: general supintendent 1933–1940: provincial bishop of Danzig	1922–1940	Ecclesiastical Region of Danzig-West Prussia
Ecclesiastical Region of Danzig-West Prussia; German: Kirchengebiet Danzig-Westpreußen	Reichsgau Danzig-West Prussia	Danzig	no synod, consistory, bishop of Danzig	1940–1945	de facto dissolved by flight, murder and expulsion of parishioners
Ecclesiastical Province of East Prussia; German: Kirchenprovinz Ostpreußen	Province of East Prussia plus West Prussia governorate in 1922 minus Memel Territory in 1925 plus Memel Territory March 1939 minus West Prussia governorate in 1940	Königsberg in Prussia	provincial synod, consistory, 1886–1933: general superintendent, 1933–1945: provincial bishop and general superintendent for Memel (1939–1944)	1886–1945	de facto dissolved by flight, murder and expulsion of parishioners
Regional Synodal Federation of the Memel Territory; German: Landessynodalverband Memelgebiet	Klaipėda Region	Memel	regional synod, consistory (est. 1927), general superintendent (as of 1926)	1925–1939	Ecclesiastical Province of East Prussia
United Evangelical Church in Polish Upper Silesia; German: Unierte Evangelische Kirche in Polnisch Oberschlesien Polish: Ewangelicki Kościół Unijny na polskim Górnym Śląsku	East Upper Silesia	Katowice	regional synod, regional ecclesiastical council (Landeskirchenrat), church president	1923–1937	church body continued without status as ecclesiastical province till 1939, then merged in the Ecclesiastical Province of Silesia
Ecclesiastical Province of Pomerania; German: Kirchenprovinz Pommern	Province of Pomerania	Stettin (till 1945), Greifswald (since 1945)	provincial synod, consistory, 1883–1933: general superintendents (east and west region), 1933–1945: provincial bishop	1821–1950	Pomeranian Evangelical Church
Ecclesiastical Province of Posen; German: Kirchenprovinz Posen	Province of Posen	Posen	provincial synod, consistory, general superintendent	1821–1920	Ecclesiastical Province of Posen-West Prussia (west), United Evangelical Church in Poland (centre; German: Unierte Evangelische Kirche in Polen, Polish: Ewangelicki Kościół Unijny w Polsce)
Ecclesiastical Province of Posen-West Prussia; German: Kirchenprovinz Posen-Westpreußen	Province of the Frontier March of Posen-West Prussia	Schneidemühl	provincial synod, consistory, 1923–1933: general superintendent, 1933–1939: provost	1921–1939	Ecclesiastical Province of Pomerania
Ecclesiastical Province of Prussia; German: Kirchenprovinz Preußen	Province of Prussia	Königsberg in Prussia	provincial synod, consistory, general superintendent	1821–1886	Ecclesiastical Province of East Prussia (east), Ecclesiastical Province of West Prussia (west)
Ecclesiastical Province of the Rhineland; German: Kirchenprovinz Rheinland	Rhine Province, western parts of the Saar Protectorate (1920–1935), Hohenzollern Province (since 1899)	Coblence (till 1934), Düsseldorf (since)	provincial synod, consistory, general superintendents	1821–1947	Evangelical Church in the Rhineland
Ecclesiastical Province of Saxony; German: Kirchenprovinz Sachsen	Province of Saxony	Magdeburg	provincial synod, 4 consistories in Magdeburg (1815–2008), Roßla (1719–1947), Stolberg at the Harz (1553–2005) and Wernigerode (1658–1930; the latter three with regional competences), 1815–1933: 3 general superintendents, 1933–1950: provincial bishops	1821–1950	Evangelical Church of the Ecclesiastical Province of Saxony
Ecclesiastical Province of Silesia; German: Kirchenprovinz Schlesien	Province of Silesia (1821–1919, 1938–1941); Province of Lower Silesia and Province of Upper Silesia (1919–1938, and 1941–1945)	Breslau (till end of 1946), Görlitz (1947–2003)	provincial synod, consistory, 1829–1933: two general superintendents, 1933–2003: (provincial) bishop	1821–1947	Evangelical Church of Silesia
Ecclesiastical Province of Westphalia; German: Kirchenprovinz Westfalen	Province of Westphalia	Münster in Westphalia	provincial synod, consistory, general superintendent	1821–1945	Evangelical Church of Westphalia
Ecclesiastical Province of West Prussia; German: Kirchenprovinz Westpreußen	Province of West Prussia	Danzig	provincial synod, consistory, 1883–1920: general superintendent	1886–1921	Regional Synodal Federation of the Free City of Danzig (north), Ecclesiastical Province of East Prussia (east), Ecclesiastical Province of Posen-West Prussia (southwest), United Evangelical Church in Poland (centre)

== Religious institutes ==
The term province, or occasionally religious province, also refers to a geographical and administrative subdivision in a number of orders and congregations. This is true of most, though not all, religious communities founded after the year AD 1000, as well as the Augustinians, who date from earlier.

A province of a religious institute is typically headed by a provincial superior. The title differs by each institute's tradition (provincial minister for Franciscans; provincial prior for Dominicans; provincial for the Augustinians, simply "provincial" or "provincial father" for the Jesuits and many others, for instance).

The borders of a religious institute's provinces are determined independently of any diocesan structure, and so the borders often differ from the 'secular', or diocesan, ecclesiastical provinces. The orders' provinces are usually far larger than a diocese, a secular province, or even a country, though sometimes they are smaller in an institute's heartland.

Most monastic orders are not organized by provinces. In general, they organise their administration through autonomous houses, in some cases grouped in larger families. For example, each Benedictine abbey is an independent foundation, but will often choose to group themselves into congregations based on historical connections.

== See also ==
- Catholic Church by country
- Global organisation of the Catholic Church
- List of Catholic archdioceses (by country and continent)
- List of Catholic dioceses (alphabetical) (including archdioceses)
- List of Catholic dioceses (structured view) (including archdioceses)

== Sources ==
- Meyendorff, John (1989). Imperial unity and Christian divisions: The Church 450-680 A.D. The Church in history. Vol. 2. Crestwood, NY: St. Vladimir's Seminary Press. ISBN 9780881410563.
- Ćirković, Sima (2004). The Serbs. Malden: Blackwell Publishing. ISBN 9781405142915.
- Kiminas, Demetrius (2009). The Ecumenical Patriarchate: A History of Its Metropolitanates with Annotated Hierarch Catalogs. Wildside Press LLC. ISBN 9781434458766.
- List of Metropolitan Archdioceses, including all Catholic ecclesiastical provinces GCatholic.org
