= Cono-Sur Congregation =

Congregation of monasteries within the Benedictine Confederation

The Cono-Sur Congregation (Congregatio Cono-Sur) is a congregation of monasteries within the Benedictine Confederation. Founded on 27 December 1976, the Congregation now includes ten male monasteries spread throughout four of the countries of South America's Southern Cone region. Additionally, eight female monasteries are members of the Congregation. The current Abbot President of the Congregation resides at Monasterio Benedictino Santa María in Los Toldos, Argentina.

The first communities, that joined a newly erected congregation were: the Abbey of San Benito in Buenos Aires, formerly belonging to the Solesmes Congregation; the Abbey of Niño Dios in Victoria, formerly belonging to the Subiaco Cassinese Congregation; the Priory of Cristo Rey in El Siambón, also formerly belonging to the Subiaco Cassinese Congregation; the Priory of Santa María in Los Toldos, formerly belonging to the Swiss Congregation and the Priory of the Santísima Trinidad in Las Condes, formerly belonging to the Beuronese Congregation.

== List of member houses and dependencies ==
=== Male ===
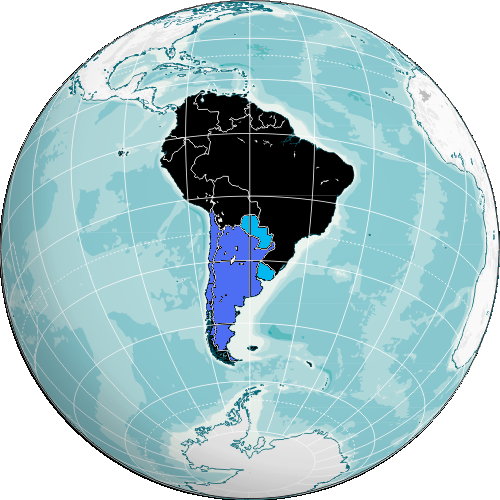
Independent (blue) and dependent (light blue) male monasteries of the Cono-Sur Congregation

- Argentina
  - Abadía del Niño Dios (1899), Entre Ríos
    - Monasterio de la Pascua, Canelones, Uruguay
    - Monasterio San Benito de Llíu Llíu, Limache, Chile
  - Abadía de Cristo Rey, El Siambón, Tucumán
  - Abadía Santa María de Los Toldos, Los Toldos
    - Monasterio Benedictino, Tupäsy María, Santiago, Paraguay
  - Abadía de San Benito, Luján
    - Padres Benedictinos, Buenos Aires
  - Monasterio de Ntra. Sra. de la Paz, San Agustín, Córdoba
- Chile
  - Abadía de la Ssma. Trinidad de Las Condes, Santiago

=== Female ===
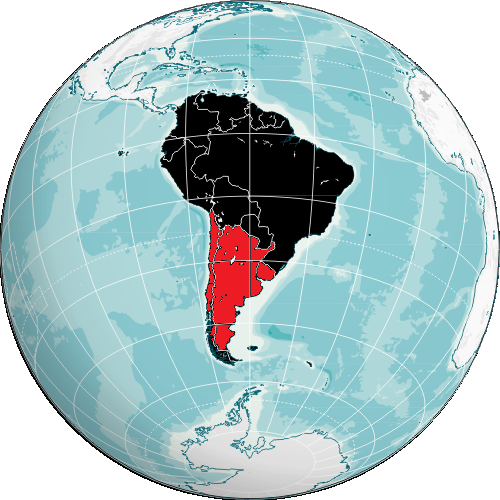
Female monasteries of the Cono-Sur Congregation

- Argentina
  - Monasterio Nuestra Señora del Paraná (1987), Aldea María Luisa, Entre Ríos
  - Abadía Nuestra Señora de la Esperanza, Rafaela, Santa Fe
  - Abadía Gaudium Mariae (1979), San Antonio de Arredondo, Córdoba
  - Monasterio Nuestra Señora de la Fidelidad, San Luis
  - Abadía de Santa Escolástica (1941), Victoria, Buenos Aires
- Chile
  - Priorato Santa María de Rautén, Quillota
  - Monasterio de la Asunción de Santa María Virgen, Rengo
- Uruguay
  - Monasterio S. María Madre de la Iglesia, Montevideo

== See also ==
- Order of Saint Benedict
- Benedictine Confederation
