= Cornelia Bosch (resistance) =

Dutch resistance member

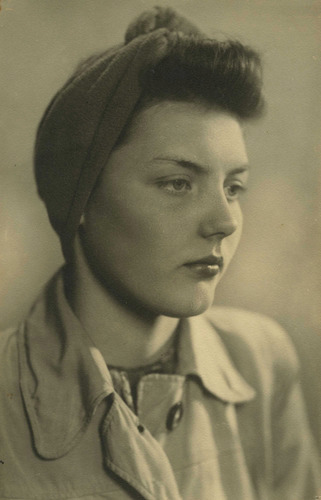
- Bosch, c. 1943
- Born: 2 August 1925; Deventer, Netherlands
- Died: 10 April 1945 (aged 19); Deventer, Netherlands
- Occupation: Resistance fighter

Cornelia Bosch (2 August 1925 – 10 April 1945) was a Dutch Resistance member during World War II.

== Biography ==
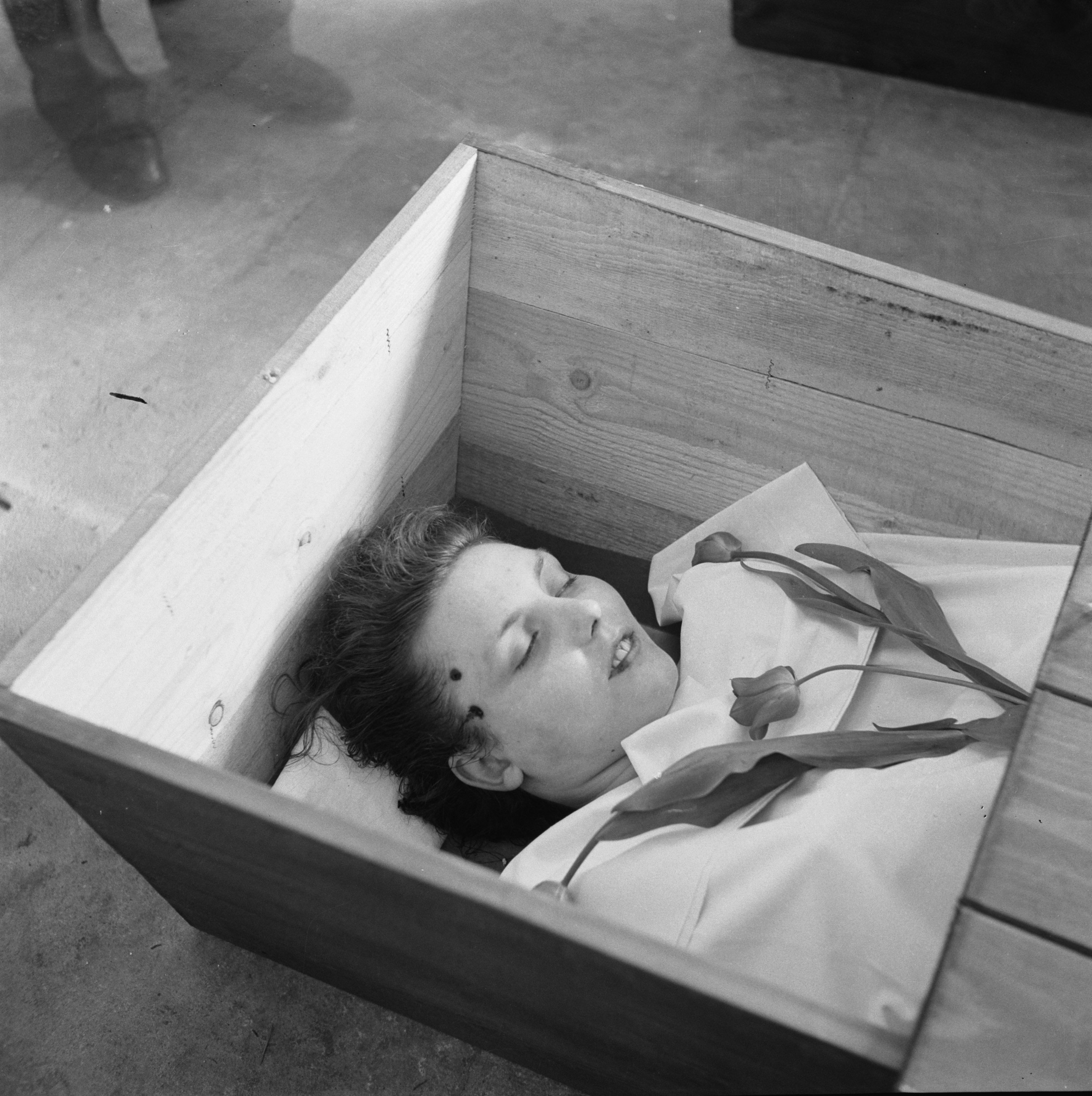
Bosch's body

Cornelia "Corrie" Bosch was one of the ten children of plasterer Johannes Bosch and Johanna Hoekstra. She resided in Deventer, where she went to primary school. After graduation, she was employed as a laboratory assistant at the food and chemical company Noury & Van der Lande, a predecessor of AkzoNobel.

During World War II, Bosch resided with her mother and three sisters while her father served as a forced labourer in Germany. She took part in resistance activities with a group of students as part of the organization Landelijke Knokploegen. Bosch fell in love with and married a fellow resistance fighter, Joost "Jos" van Baalen, marrying him on 28 March 1945.

On 8 April 1945, five members of the Communist Party of the Netherlands, including van Baalen, congregated in an abandoned factory near a bridge over the IJssel to allow Allied forces access to Deventer and to prevent it from being destroyed by retreating German troops. Bosch was intended to bring supplies to the fighters, joining them along with two other students on 9 April. On 10 April, the bridge was destroyed, killing two resistance fighters and setting the factory ablaze. Bosch, along with her husband and three other resistants, was executed with a shot to the head on the grounds of a nearby slaughterhouse. German soldier Ernst Gräwe refused to take part in the executions and was also shot.

The resistance fighters' execution was known in the Netherlands as the Twentol drama. Post-war investigations into the unit that committed the massacre were inconclusive.

== Burial and commemoration ==
Photographs of Bosch's body in an opened wooden coffin were circulated in various foreign newspapers, including the Daily Mirror. The victims were buried on 14 April 1945 in Diepenveen.

In 2019, stolpersteine were laid for Bosch and her husband at their former residence in Deventer.
