= Congregation (group of houses) =

In some religious orders of the Catholic Church, a congregation is a group of religious houses. In monastic orders, this would be monasteries; in orders of canons regular, this would be chapters. Each congregation operates as an autonomous or independent subdivision of the religious order, and is presided over by a superior with a title such as abbot general, arch-abbot, abbot president, president, abbot ordinary, provost general or superior general.

== List ==
=== Canons Regular ===
The Annuario Pontificio lists the following as the congregations of the Canons Regular of Saint Augustine, whose abbot primate lives in Rome:

Canons Regular of the Congregation of the Most Holy Saviour of the Lateran (abbot general in Rome)
Canons Regular of the Austrian Lateran Congregation (1907 – abbot general in Klosterneuburg, Austria)
Canons Regular of the Hospitalary Congregation of Great Saint Bernard (11th century – provost general in Martigny, Switzerland)
Canons Regular of the Swiss Congregation of Saint-Maurice of Agaune (1128 – abbot ordinary in Saint-Maurice, Switzerland)
Canons Regular of Saint Augustine of the Congregation of Windesheim (1386 – provost general in Paring, Germany)
Canons Regular of the Congregation of Saint Victor (1968 – abbot general in Champagne-sur-Rhône, France)
Canons Regular of the Immaculate Conception (1866 – superior general in Rome)
Canons Regular of the Congregation of the Brothers of Common Life (14th century – superior general in Weilheim, Germany)

=== Benedictines ===
The Annuario Pontificio lists the following congregations of the Benedictine Confederation, whose Abbot Primate lives in Rome:

English Benedictine Congregation (1336 – Abbot President in Radstock, England)
Hungarian Congregation (1514 – Archabbot in Pannonhalma, Hungary)
Swiss Congregation (1602– Abbot President in Bolzano, Italy)
Austrian Congregation (1625 – Abbot President in Stift Göttweig, Austria)
Bavarian Congregation (1684 – Abbot President in Kloster Schäftlarn, Germany)
Brazilian Congregation (1827 – Abbot President in Salvador, Brazil)
Solesmes Congregation (1837 – Abbot President in Sablé-sur-Sarthe, France)
American-Cassinese Congregation (1855 – Abbot President in Collegeville, United States)
Subiaco Cassinese Congregation (1867 – Abbot President in Rome)
Beuronese Congregation (1873 – Abbot President in Maria Laach, Germany)
Swiss-American Congregation (1881 – Abbot President in Saint Meinrad, Indiana, United States)
Ottilien Congregation (1884 – Archabbot President in St. Ottilien Archabbey, Germany)
Congregation of the Annunciation (1920 – Abbot President in Trier, Germany)
Slav Congregation (1945 – Prior Administrator in Prague, Czech Republic)
Cono-Sur Congregation (1976 – Abbot President in Los Toldos, Argentina)

==== Previously independent monastic orders which have joined the Benedictine Confederation ====
Camaldolese Congregation (980 – Prior General in Camaldoli, Italy)
Vallombrosian Congregation (1036 – Abbot General in Florence, Italy)
Sylvestrine Congregation (1231 – Abbot General in Rome)
Olivetan Congregation (1319 – Abbot General in Asciano, Italy)

=== Cistercians ===
The Annuario Pontificio lists the following congregations of Cistercians, whose Abbot General lives in Rome:

Castilian Cistercian Congregation (1425 – Abbot General acts as pro-President)
Cistercian Congregation of St Bernard in Italy (1497 – abbot president in San Severino Marche, Italy)
Cistercian Congregation of the Crown of Aragon (1616 – abbot president in Poblet, Spain)
Mehrerau Cistercian Congregation (1624 – abbot president in Bregenz, Austria)
Austrian Cistercian Congregation (1859 – abbot president in Heiligenkreuz, Austria)
Cistercian Congregation of the Immaculate Conception (1867 – abbot president in Ile Saint Honorat, France)
Zirc Cistercian Congregation (1923 – abbot president in Zirc, Hungary)
Casamari Cistercian Congregation (1929 – abbot president in Casamari, Italy)
Cistercian Congregation of Mary Queen of the World (1953 – abbot president in Kraków, Poland)
Brazilian Cistercian Congregation (1961 – abbot president in Itaporanga, Brazil)
Cistercian Congregation of the Holy Family (1964 – abbot president in Thành-Phô Ho Chí Minh, Vietnam)

== See also ==
- Religious congregation
- Congregation (Roman Curia)
