= Menapace =

Menapace is a surname. It may refer to:

- Lidia Menapace (1924–2020), Italian Resistance fighter and politician
- Mamerto Menapace (1942–2025), Argentine Roman Catholic monk and writer
- Matteo Menapace, game designer
- Nick Menapace, American politician

== See also ==
- Men in Space
