= Prince of Peace =

Prince of Peace may refer to:

== In religion ==
- "Prince of Peace" in Isaiah 9 in the Book of Isaiah in the Hebrew Bible or the Old Testament of the Christian Bible
  - interpreted by Christians as a Christian messianic prophecy referring to Jesus Christ
  - interpreted by Jews in other ways as Pele-joez-el-gibbor-abi-ad-sar-shalom

=== Churches and religious establishments ===
- Prince of Peace Lutheran Church, Woodridge, Illinois, U.S.
- St. Vincent de Paul Catholic Church (Mobile, Alabama), now known as Prince of Peace Church
- Prince of Peace Votive Church, Nombre de Dios (mission), St. Augustine, Florida, U.S.
- Tigoni Conventual Priory (the Prince of Peace Conventual Priory), Tigoni, Nairobi Province, Kenya
- Prince of Peace Abbey in Oceanside, California, U.S., founded by St. Meinrad Archabbey
- Prince of Peace Parish, Toronto, Ontario, Canada

== Schools and colleges ==
- Prince of Peace Preparatory, a school in Clinton, Iowa, U.S.
  - and 2 other schools in Iowa
- Prince of Peace Lutheran College, Everton Hills, North Brisbane, Australia
- Prince Of Peace Academy, parish of Mother of God Roman Catholic Church (Covington, Kentucky)
- Prince of Peace Catholic Church and School, a school in Hoover, Alabama, U.S.
- Prince of Peace Catholic Schools, former names for Shawe Memorial High School and Pope John XXIII Elementary, Madison, Indiana. U.S.
- Prince of Peace Catholic School, a grade school in Plano, Texas, U.S.
- Prince of Peace Catholic School, a grade school in Taylors, South Carolina, U.S.
- Prince of Peace Catholic School, an elementary school in Toronto, Ontario, Canada.
- Prince of Peace Christian School, a K-12 school is Plano, Texas, U.S.

== Music ==
- Prince of Peace, 1969 album by Johnny Nash
- Prince of Peace: Radio Broadcast 1970, album by Leon Russell
- "Prince of Peace", single from 2016 album Of Dirt and Grace: Live from the Land by Hillsong United
- "Prince of Peace", song by Crowbar (Canadian band)
- "Prince of Peace", track on 2007 album Ilembe by Ladysmith Black Mambazo
- "Prince of Peace", track on 1973 album Izipho Zam (My Gifts) by Pharoah Sanders
- "Prince of Peace", track by Paul Revere & the Raiders from their 1971 album Indian Reservation

== Other uses ==
- Prince of the Peace (title), a non-hereditary title in the peerage of Spain
- Prince of Peace (Indian film), an unrealized Indian film by Singeetam Srinivasa Rao, starring Pawan Kalyan as Jesus Christ
- The Lawton Story of The Prince of Peace, a 1948 American film
- Prince of Peace, 2003 portrait by Akiane
- Prince of Peace, novel by James Carroll (author) (born 1943)
- Prince of Peace, a book by Isabella Macdonald Alden

== See also ==
- Princess of Peace (disambiguation)
- Missa Princeps Pacis (Mass Prince of Peace), a mass composed by William Lloyd Webber in 1962
