= Mamerto Menapace =

Argentine monk and author (1942–2025)

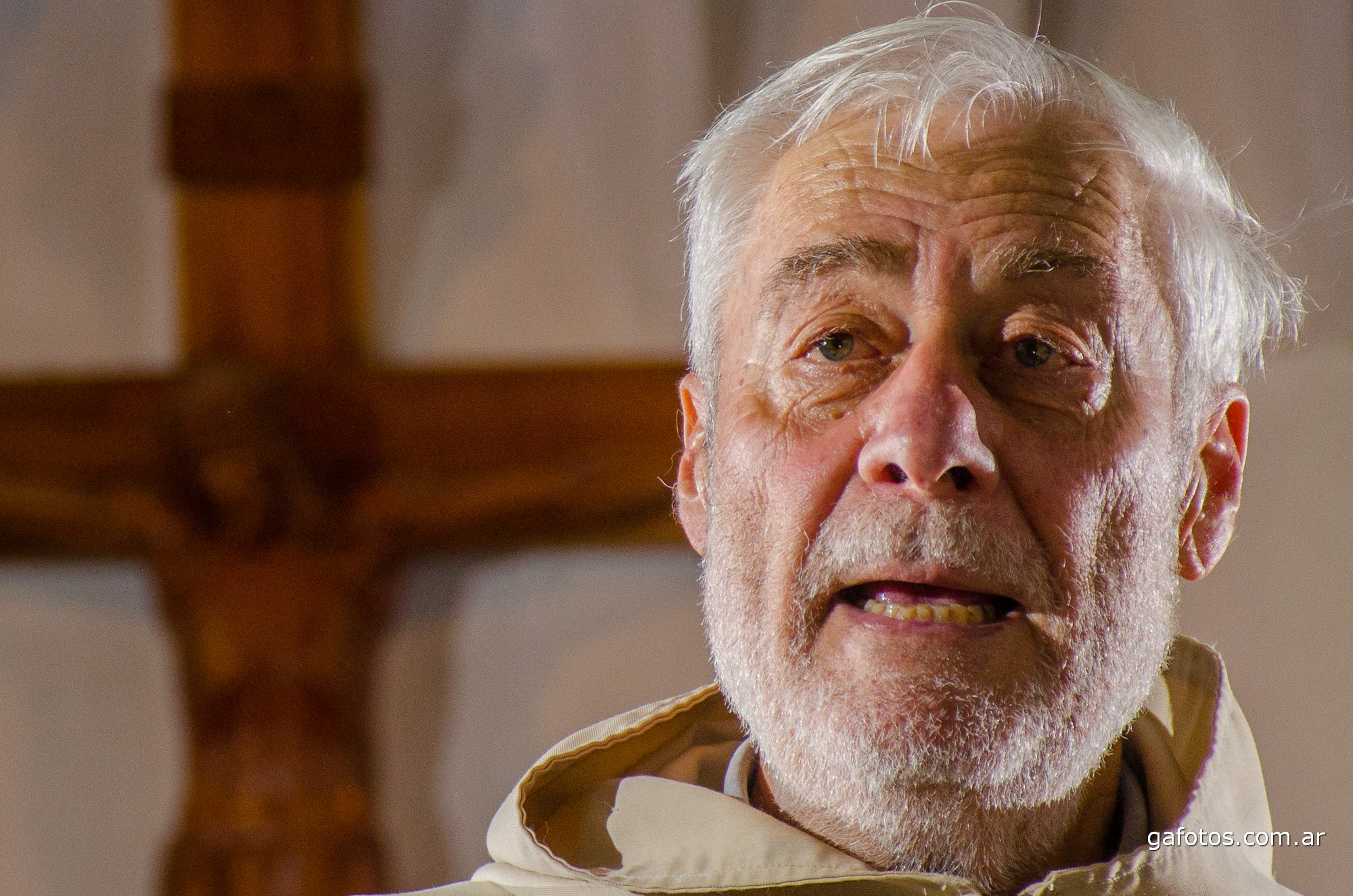
- Menapace in 2018

Personal life
- Born: 24 January 1942
- Died: 6 June 2025 (aged 83) Junín, Argentina

Religious life
- Religion: Catholic Church
- Order: Order of Saint Benedict

Mamerto Menapace (24 January 1942 – 6 June 2025) was an Argentine Catholic monk and writer.

== Biography ==
Menapace was born on 24 January 1942, the son of Antonio and Josefina; he was the ninth of thirteen siblings. At the age of ten he entered the Benedictine monastery of Santa María de Los Toldos, founded in 1948, and later decided to enter the Order of Saint Benedict. He studied theology at the Benedictine monastery of Las Condes, in Chile, and was ordained a deacon by Cardinal Raúl Silva Henríquez in 1966. That same year he was ordained a priest. He also graduated as a National Teacher in a school run by the Marist Brothers.

Back in Argentina, he settled permanently in the monastery of Los Toldos in Buenos Aires, where in 1974 he was elected superior of his community. That year he gave refuge to Father Carlos Mugica, threatened by different factions of Peronism, a month before his assassination. He was canonically elevated to the dignity of abbot of the monastery in August 1980, in a ceremony presided over by Cardinal Eduardo Pironio. He was abbot of the Monastery of Santa María de los Toldos for two periods, from 1980 to 1992. In 1995 he was appointed abbot president of the Benedictine Congregation that brings together the monasteries of Chile, Paraguay, Uruguay and Argentina.

From 1976 onwards, he published his books through Editora Patria Grande and became very popular in the Catholic Church in Argentina and abroad. He published more than forty books on topics ranging from encountering God to growing in faith. In 1994 he received the Konex Award - Diploma of Merit as one of the five greatest exponents of Youth Literature.

On 6 June 2025, Menapace died in Junín, after having been transferred from the Santa María de Los Toldos Monastery. He was 83.
