= Sion Abbey (Netherlands) =

Dutch monastery

Coordinates: 52°18′30.6″N 6°11′35.7″E

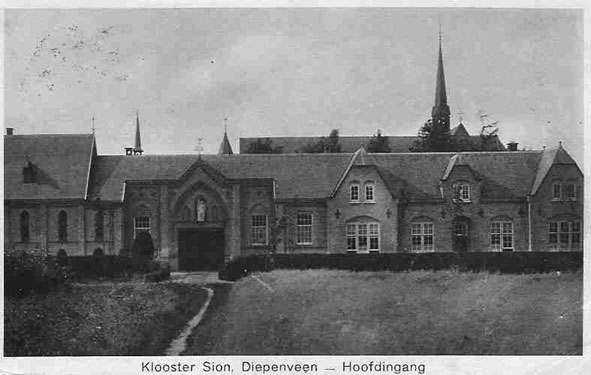
Sion Abbey around 1929

Sion Abbey (Dutch: Abdij Sion) was a Trappist monastery in Diepenveen, Overijssel, Netherlands, in the Diocese of Utrecht.

== History ==
The monastery, which was set up in 1833, is a daughter house of Achel Abbey. This was the only Trappist community in the Netherlands north of the great rivers (i.e., the Nederrijn, the Lek, the Waal, the Merwede and the Maas). Since 1935 the monastery has had the status of an abbey. Most of the complex is in Neo-Gothic style and was designed by architect Gerard te Riele.

In 2015, the community sold their property and the remaining monks have founded New Sion Abbey on the island of Schiermonnikoog.
