= Princess of Peace =

Princess of Peace may refer to:

- Princess Taiping, a princess of the Tang Dynasty in China
- Pocahontas, a 17th-century Native American, as described in Pocahontas, a 1994 film

== See also ==
- Prince of Peace (disambiguation)
