= Monastery of St Odile =

Benedictine monastery in DR Congo

Monastery information
- Other name: St Odilia's Monastery
- Order: Congregation of Missionary Benedictines of Saint Ottilien, Order of Saint Benedict
- Established: 1990
- Disestablished: 1996
- Dedication: St Odile
- Diocese: Roman Catholic Archdiocese of Kananga

People
- Founder: Fr Joseph Hilaire

Site
- Location: Malandji, Kasaï Occidental, Democratic Republic of the Congo

The Monastery of St Odile, Malandji (Kananga), Kasaï Occidental province, Democratic Republic of the Congo, was a Benedictine monastery of the Congregation of Missionary Benedictines of Saint Ottilien. Established in Zaïre in 1990 by two members of St Ottilien Archabbey, the monastery was suppressed in 1996 during the First Congo War.

== History ==
In 1990, the Congregation of Missionary Benedictines of Saint Ottilien was offered the opportunity to start a monastic foundation in Zaïre. The Archbishop of Kananga, Martin-Léonard Bakole wa Illunga, desired the presence of Benedictine monks in the predominantly Catholic Malandji (Kananga) area. In May 1990, he met with Archabbot Notker Wolf, who recruited Fr Joseph Hilaire, a Monfortanian priest from Haiti, and Bro Philippe Bauduin, a young Frenchman, to establish a foundation. The two founders had received their monastic formation at St Ottilien Archabbey, Bauduin having just made his oblation in October 1989. Hilaire himself had spent a few years in Zaïre in the mid-1980s, gauging whether the country would be hospitable to monastic life.

On the Feast of St Odile, December 13, 1990, the two monks arrived in Malandji (Kananga), taking up residence in a tenement house. Assisted by the groundwork that Hilaire had laid during his previous visits, the two quickly gathered nearly thirty young men and women interested in monastic life. These met weekly for spiritual discussions, particularly regarding the Benedictine tradition. They also joined Hilaire and Bauduin in manual work, clearing bush and gardening. By early January 1991, five of these candidates were accepted as postulants. Thus, a nascent community came into being.

A year after the arrival of Hilaire and Bauduin, Archabbot Notker Wolf visited the community and officially recognized it as a pre-foundation of the Congregation of Missionary Benedictines of Saint Ottilien.

In 1996, the monastery was suspended due to the First Congo War. The monks of Malandji joined the Benedictine community of the Abbey of Mvimwa, Tanzania.

== See also ==
- Order of Saint Benedict
- Congregation of Missionary Benedictines of Saint Ottilien
- Roman Catholicism in the Democratic Republic of the Congo
