= Abadía de Cristo Rey =

Monastery in Argentina

- Interactive map of Abadía de Cristo Rey

Monastery information
- Other names: Abbey of Christ the King, El Siambón Abbey
- Order: Cono-Sur Congregation, Order of Saint Benedict
- Established: 1956
- Mother house: Abadía del Niño Dios
- Dedication: Christ the King
- Diocese: Roman Catholic Archdiocese of Tucumán

People
- Founder: Monks of Abadía del Niño Dios
- Abbot: Juan Carlos Romano (prior administrator)

Site
- Location: El Siambón, Tucumán, Argentina
- Coordinates: 26.71757496274257°S 65.44439895569501°W

Abadía de Cristo Rey, El Siambón, Tucumán, Argentina, is a Benedictine monastery of the Cono-Sur Congregation. Founded by the monks of Abadía del Niño Dios in 1956, the monastery went on to become an abbey. As of 2000, the monastery was home to twelve monks, under the leadership of Prior Administrator Juan Carlos Romano.

== History ==
In 1899, Abadía del Niño Dios was founded by the Abbey of Belloc, France, a member of the Subiaco Congregation. By 1929, Niño Dios had become an independent abbey, the first in Spanish America. In 1956, twelve monks from Abadía del Niño Dios, five priests, six clerics, and on brother, established a monastic foundation at El Siambón, a mountain-ringed valley 60 km from the provincial capital, San Miguel de Tucumán. Despite the fact that the monastery itself took some years to construct, the nascent community immediately began to live the Benedictine life. At the same time, they started ministering to the spiritual needs of the residents of the valley.

Four years after its foundation, the monastery was raised to the status of a conventual priory by the Abbot General of the Subiaco Congregation. At this time, the monastic community included sixteen monks. The monastery would eventually be raised to the status of an abbey, and went on to join the newly formed Cono-Sur Congregation.

== Apostolic work ==
Since the monastery's inception, the community of Cristo Rey has been involved in pastoral work, administering the sacraments to the inhabitants of the neighborhood. They are assisted in their efforts by a nearby community of Sisters of the Good Shepherd.

Additionally, the monks are involved in forestry, apiculture, and the production of fruit compote and marmalade.

== Personnel ==
As of 2000, the community of El Siambón included twelve monks, six of whom were ordained priests. The monks of Abadía de Cristo Rey are under the leadership of Prior Administrator Juan Carlos Romano.

== See also ==
- Order of Saint Benedict
- Cono-Sur Congregation
- Abadía del Niño Dios
- Roman Catholicism in Argentina
