= Majk Abbey =

Camaldolese abbey in Hungary

Coordinates: 47.49705°N 18.33782°E

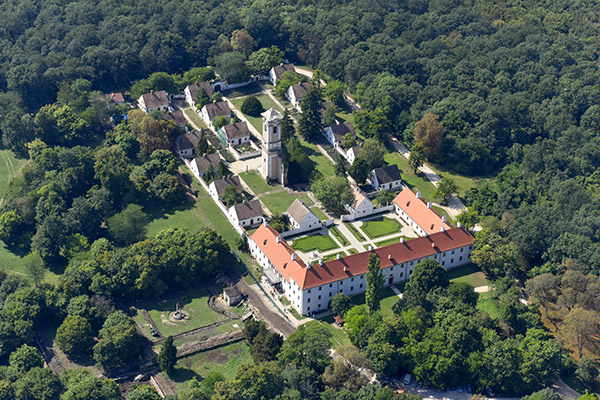
Aerial photograph of Majk Abbey

Majk Abbey (Hungarian: Majk Apátság, Hungarian: Majk Abbey) is a Camaldolese abbey in Hungary and contains hermit houses (monastic cells) and a monastery church.
