= Abadía de San Benito =

Benedictine monastery in Argentina

- Interactive map of Abadía de San Benito

Monastery information
- Other name: Abadía de Luján
- Order: Cono-Sur Congregation, Order of Saint Benedict
- Established: 1914
- Mother house: Abbey of Santo Domingo de Silos
- Dedication: St Benedict
- Diocese: Roman Catholic Archdiocese of Mercedes-Luján

People
- Founder: Fr Fermín de Melchor
- Abbot: Jorge Moran
- Prior: Fernando Rivas

Site
- Location: Luján, Buenos Aires Province, Argentina
- Coordinates: 34.57184367189157°S 59.16019406408438°W

Abadía de San Benito, Luján, Buenos Aires Province, Argentina, is a Benedictine monastery of the Cono-Sur Congregation. Originally established in Buenos Aires, the monastery became an abbey in 1950 and later transferred to the outskirts of Luján. As of 2020, the monastery was home to 13 monks, under the leadership of Abbot P. Jorge Moran.

== History ==
In 1914, Fr Fermín de Melchor led a number of monks from the Abbey of Santo Domingo de Silos, a Spanish monastery of the Solesmes Congregation, to Buenos Aires, Argentina to establish a monastic foundation. On December 8 of that year, the monks relocated to Bellocq, but by 1916 had found rural life untenable, and returned to Buenos Aires. In 1920, the monastic community began constructing a monastery.

While at Buenos Aires, the work of the community included catechetics, the promotion of Gregorian Chant, and the publication of spiritual and liturgical literature (including sacramentaries, missals, and the reviews Pax and Revista Liturgica Argentina). In the years preceding the Second Vatican Council, the monks devoted particular attention to the renewal of Christian life and culture in the surrounding area.

On March 28, 1938, the monastery at Buenos Aires became independent, being raised to the status of a conventual priory. On October 28, 1950, the monastery was elevated to abbatial status, and Dom Andrés Azcárate (1891-1981) was elected the first abbot of the community. As abbot, Azcárate became an enthusiastic propagator of liturgical reform and Benedictine spirituality. In 1963, Azcárate was succeeded as abbot by Dom Lorenzo Manuel Molinero (1901-1979).

Following the Second Vatican Council, the population of the monastic community decreased. The monks were forced to consolidate their efforts, abandoning many of their previous apostolates and transferring the monastery to a rural location near Luján on April 12, 1987.

== Apostolic work ==
Due to the small size of the monastic communities, the current apostolic work of the monks is not as wide-ranging as in the past. Nowadays, the monks support themselves with agricultural work and the production of marmalade. Additionally, philosophical and theological studies continue at the abbey, and a trimestral review, Coloquio, is published.

== Personnel ==
As of 2000, the community at Luján included 13 monks, five of whom were ordained priests. The monks of Abadía de San Benito are under the leadership of Abbot Fr Fernando Ricas.

== See also ==
- Order of Saint Benedict
- Cono-Sur Congregation
- Roman Catholicism in Argentina
