= Luján, Buenos Aires =

City in Argentina

Luján
- City
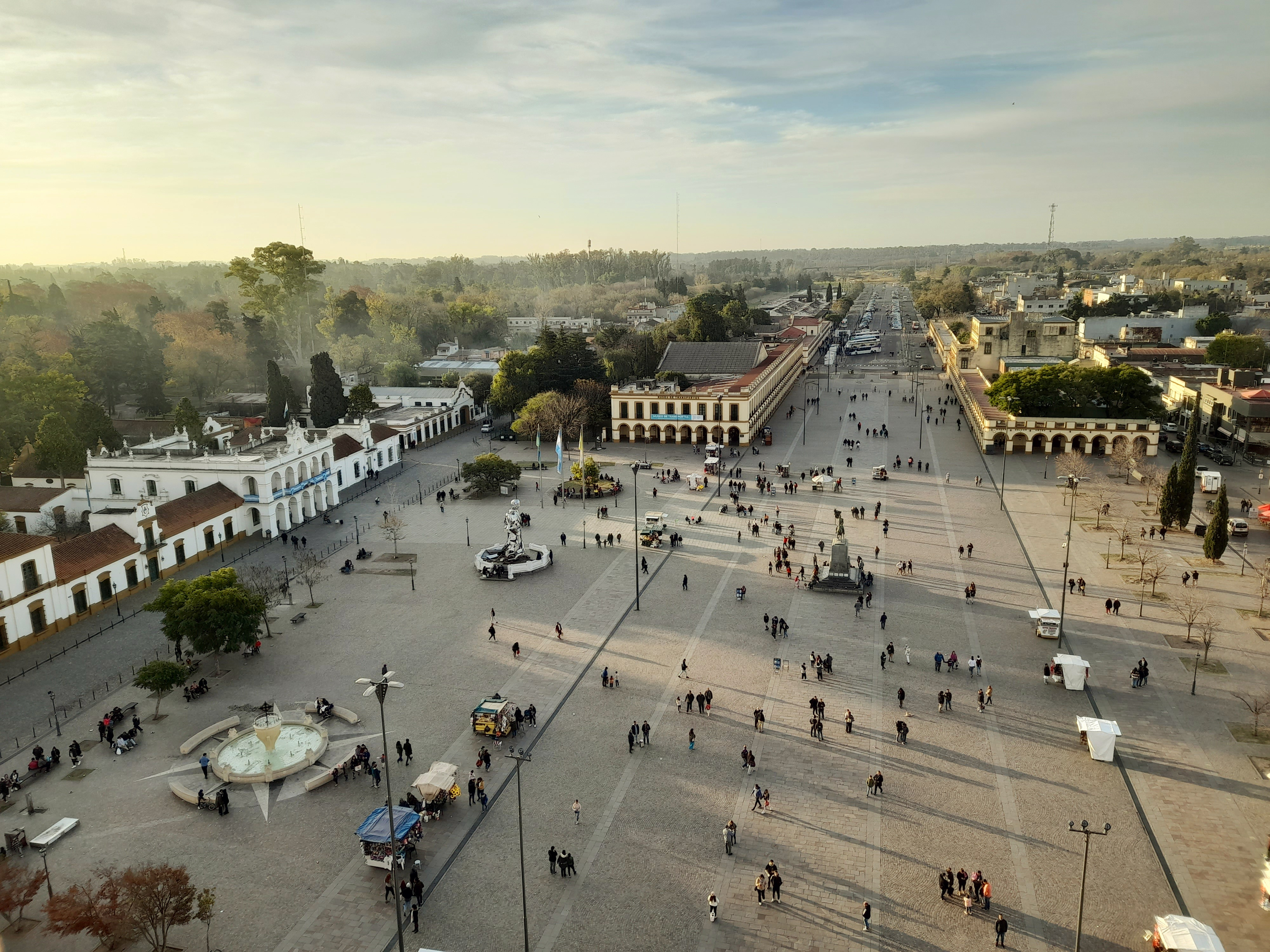

- Location in Argentina Luján (Argentina)
- Coordinates: 34°34′S 59°06′W
- Country: Argentina
- Province: Buenos Aires
- Partido: Luján
- Elevation: 21 m (69 ft)

Population (2010 census)
  - Total: 106,899
- CPA Base: B 6700
- Area code: +54 2323
- Website: Official website

Luján (pronounced [luˈxan]) is a city in the Buenos Aires province of Argentina, located 68 kilometres (42 miles) northwest of the city of Buenos Aires. The city was founded in 1755 and has a population of 106,899 (per the 2010 census [INDEC]).

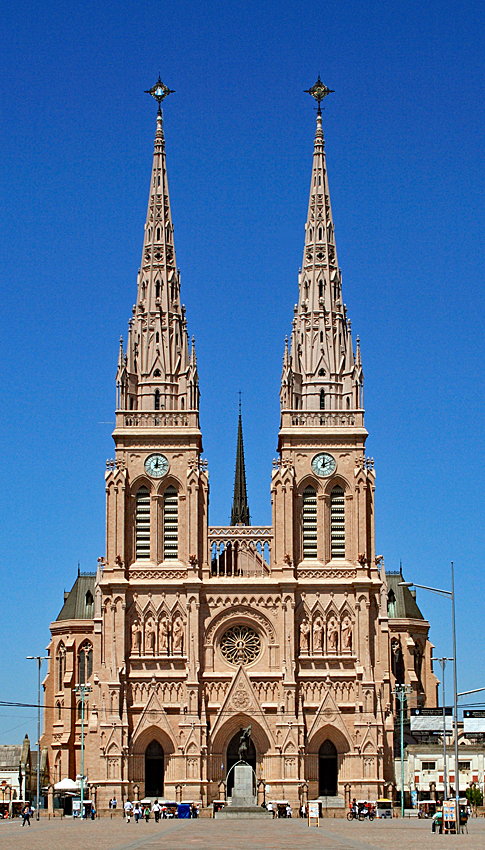
The Basilica of Our Lady of Luján.

Luján is best known for its large, neo-gothic Basilica, built in honor of the Virgin of Luján, the patron saint of Argentina. Every year, more than six million people make pilgrimages to the basilica, many walking there from Buenos Aires. The city is known as La Capital de la Fe (Capital of the Faith). It is a popular day-trip for non-believers too, with abundant grill restaurants (like most places in Argentina) and souvenir shops with kitsch religious memorabilia.

The church was designed by the French architect Ulderico Courtois and started in 1889, completed by 1937. Its towers stand 106 m (348 ft) high, and it has a copper roof and bronze doors. The huge church towers over the surrounding flat country and houses the tiny 38 cm (15 in) high statue of the Virgin. A large and important organ by French builder Cavaille-Coll stands in the gallery in a state of deterioration, although efforts are underway to see to its restoration. The development of the city was altered by the basilica's construction, as the main commercial district in the city began to move away from the basilica, being replaced by shops for religious pilgrims.

Luján is also home to the Enrique Udaondo museum complex, housing exhibitions of colonial life in the house of the Viceroy and old town hall, with art, uniforms, silverware and transport with many antique vehicles including Plus Ultra the first hydroplane to cross from Europe to Argentina and La Porteña, Argentina's first steam locomotive operated by Ferrocarril Oeste. Also on display are the prison cells where Colonel William Carr Beresford, commander of the 1806 British invading forces, and General Cornelio Saavedra, president of the first national government (Primera Junta) in 1810, were held.

Since 1987, Benedictine monks of the Cono-Sur Congregation have resided at Abadía de San Benito on the outskirts of Luján. In addition to providing retreat facilities for the residents of the city, the monks support themselves by means of agriculture and publishing.

The nearby city of Mercedes is seat of the Bishop of Mercedes and Luján. Luján is the principal settlement of the Lujan Partido or municipality. The city has a railway and bus station and is easily reached from Buenos Aires.
