= Monasterio Benedictino Santa María =

- Interactive map of Monasterio Benedictino Santa María

Monastery information
- Other name: Abadía de Los Toldos
- Order: Cono-Sur Congregation, Order of Saint Benedict
- Established: 1948
- Mother house: Abbey of Einsiedeln
- Dedication: St Mary
- Diocese: 9 de Julio
- Controlled churches: El Tejar

People
- Founder: Monks of Einsiedeln
- Abbot: Enrique Contreras
- Prior: Meinrado Hux

Site
- Location: Los Toldos, Buenos Aires Province, Argentina

Monasterio Benedictino Santa María, Los Toldos, Buenos Aires Province, Argentina, is a Benedictine monastery of the Cono-Sur Congregation. Founded by the monks of the Abbey of Einsiedeln in 1948, the monastery was raised to the rank of an abbey in 1980. As of 2000, the monastery was home to 28 monks, under the leadership of Abbot Fr Enrique Contreras.

== History ==
On May 3, 1948, a group of monks from the Abbey of Einsiedeln, Switzerland, traveled to Argentina to establish a foundation for the Swiss Congregation. The monastery, located in Argentina's Buenos Aires Province, became a conventual (independent) priory on July 31, 1968. The monastery was raised to the status of an abbey on August 6, 1980.

On July 22, 1984, the Abbey of Los Toldos established the monastery of Tupäsy María in Santiago, Misiones, Paraguay. Four of the monks of Los Toldos reside at this foundation.

== Apostolic work ==
At Monasterio Benedictino Santa María, the products of agriculture and animal husbandry sustain the monks. The monastery is known for producing its own Swiss cheese from a recipe passed on from its founders. The monks also brew beer and make dulce de leche.

The monastery guesthouse welcomes around one thousand visitors annually. Here, Bible courses are offered. Additionally, the monks evangelize a nearby population of indigenous Argentinians, and provide pastoral ministry to the parish of El Tejar and its two dependent stations.

== Personnel ==
As of 2000, the community at Los Toldos included 28 monks, 14 of whom were ordained priests. The monks of Monasterio Benedictino Santa María are under the leadership of Abbot Fr Enrique Contreras, who is assisted in his duties by Prior Meinrado Hux.

== See also ==
- Order of Saint Benedict
- Cono-Sur Congregation
- Roman Catholicism in Argentina
