= Abbey of San Gerolamo =

Italian Catholic place of worship

Coordinates: 44.3948°N 8.9885°E

- Abbazia di San Gerolamo
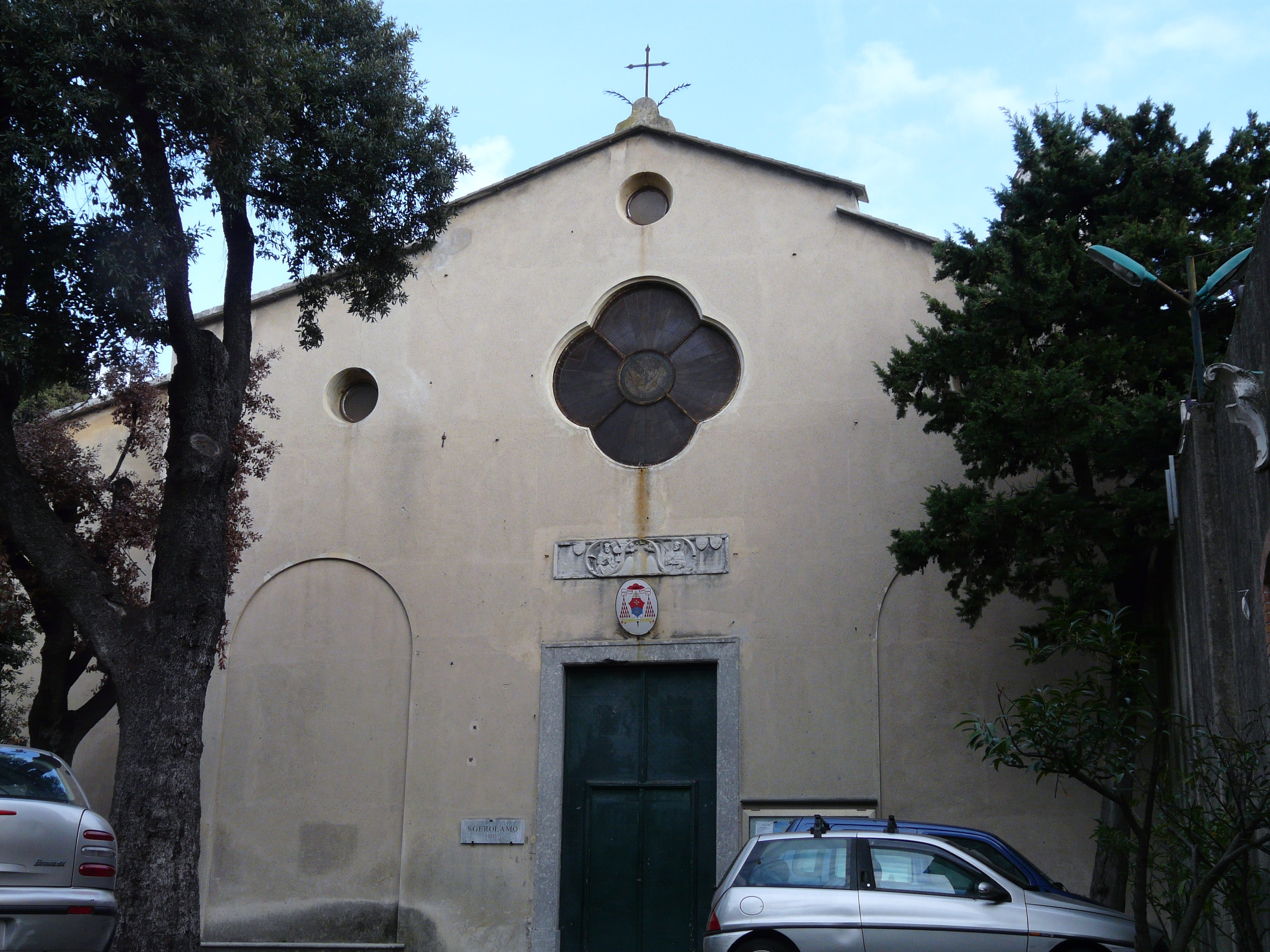
- Location: Quarto dei Mille, Genoa
- Country: Italy
- Denomination: Catholic Church

History
- Founder: Alfonso Pecha de Guadalati
- Dedication: Saint Jerome
- Consecrated: 1182

Architecture
- Style: Gothic
- Groundbreaking: 1383
- Closed: 1797 (temporarily)

Administration
- Archdiocese: Archdiocese of Genoa

The Abbey of San Gerolamo is a Catholic place of worship located in the Quarto dei Mille district, on Via Redipuglia, in the municipality of Genoa in the Metropolitan City of Genoa. The church serves as the seat of the namesake parish in the vicariate of Quarto of the Roman Catholic Archdiocese of Genoa. The building is adjacent to the Giannina Gaslini Institute.

== History ==
=== Foundation ===
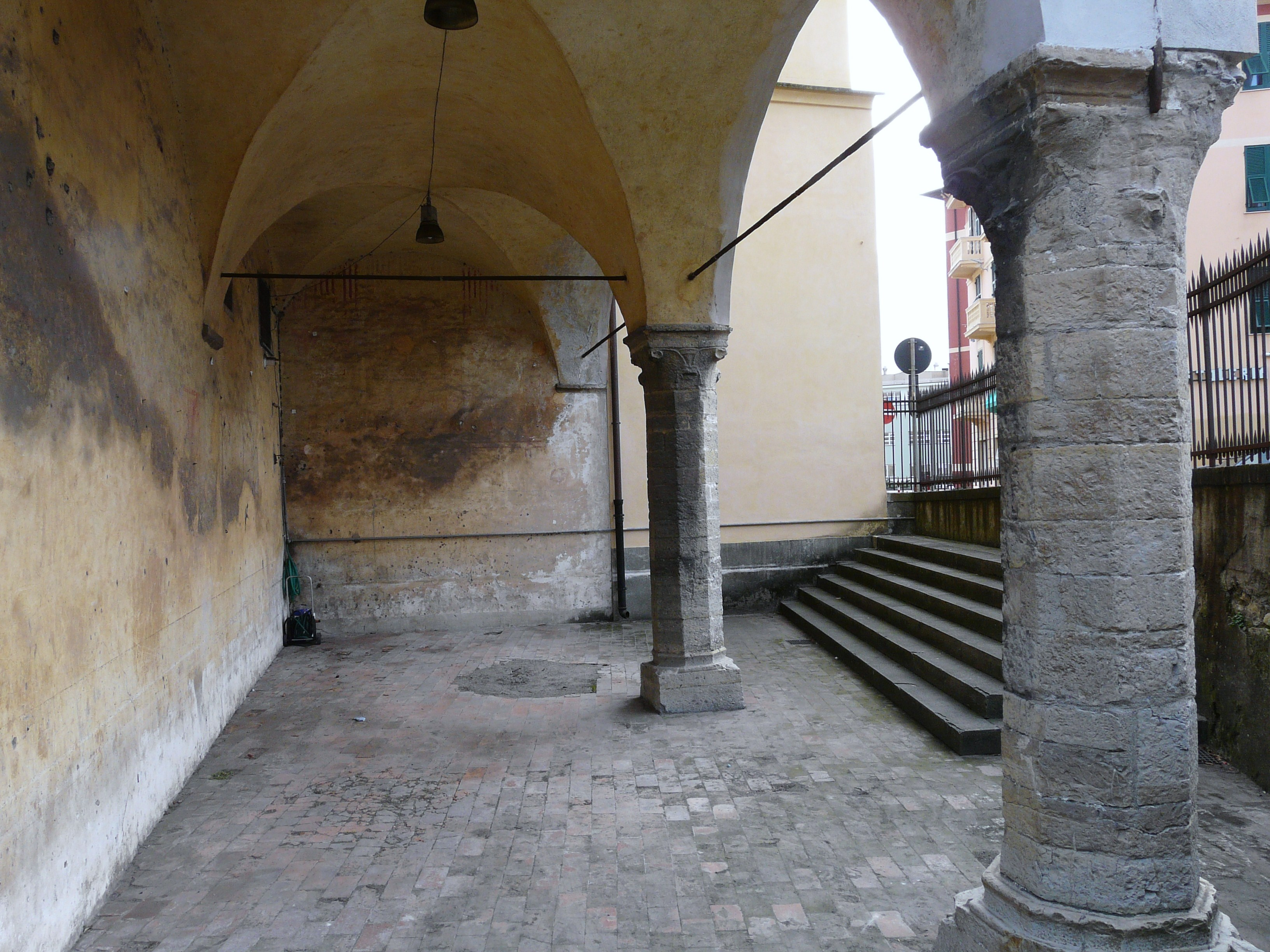
The external cloister

The events that led to the origin of the abbey began in Spain during the Western Schism of the Catholic Church in the 14th century. Following the exile of the popes to Avignon and the subsequent alignment of European forces in support of either Pope Urban IV or Antipope Clement VII, King John I of Castile and León sided with the antipope, creating an untenable situation in Spain: those who wished to remain Spanish citizens had to support the antipope or face exile. A group of Hieronymite monks, a newly established movement that professed the Rule of Saint Augustine, chose exile. Arriving in Genoa, they asked the Pope of Rome for permission to build a monastery dedicated to their protector, Saint Jerome, and on August 5, 1383, the Pope granted permission with a brief.

The monks did not arrive in Genoa by chance; Alfonso Pecha de Guadalati, a member of the congregation and brother of the Hieronymite founder and Bishop of Jaén, had the fortune of being the confessor, advisor, travel companion, and editor of the writings of Saint Bridget of Sweden. During a journey and stay in Genoa with Saint Bridget, Alfonso Pecha discovered the location where the monastery would be built, which was then a green hillock near the Ligurian Sea. To confirm that Alfonso Pecha was the one who initiated the monastery, there is a sepulchral plaque, still visible inside the church, attributing the foundation of the monastic complex to him. After papal approval, the project progressed quickly, and on December 18, 1383, the Hieronymites purchased the land where the church still stands today for 1,100 Genoese lire. With the aid of alms and a contribution from the Benedictine monks of Santo Stefano, a significant portion of the work was completed.

Four years later, in 1387, the first prior was elected, but he died shortly thereafter, as did many other monks of the community, which was quickly reduced to only two individuals: the founder Bishop Alfonso and Brother Innocenzo. Due to the grave situation, the bishop decided to transfer the foundation to the Olivetan Benedictine Congregation, which offered the assurance of completing the work he had started. Monks began arriving from Siena, forming a new community that, the following year, included another twelve monks, allowing the normal monastic life to resume.

=== The Olivetan Period ===
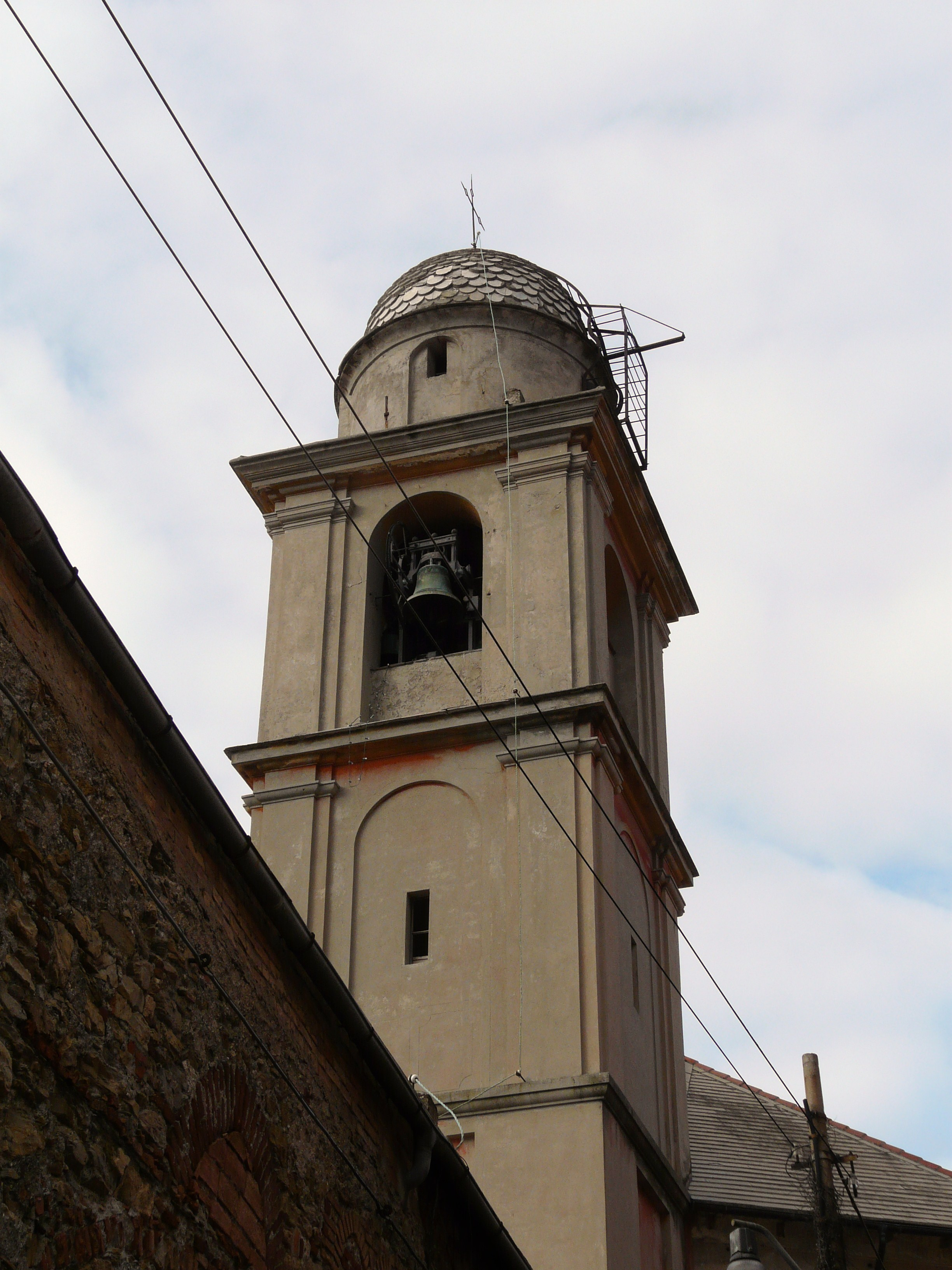
The bell tower

The first transformations were carried out by the Olivetan monks, who expanded the original apse to create the large Sancta Sanctorum, with the main altar at its center and the choir around it. After these initial transformations, the consecration of the main altar (1492) and the church (1495) took place.

In 1535, the monastery became an independent abbey with its own abbot. The position of abbot was often held by members of the most important Genoese families of the time (Adorno, Fieschi, Imperiale, Centurione), highlighting the spiritual and social significance the Abbey of San Gerolamo had gained over time. The proximity of such influential families facilitated the expansion and completion of the abbey's structures. The sacristy was built by Luciano Spinola, and the Spinola family later restored it in 1542 and again in 1609.

In 1487, Nicola Da Passano bequeathed funds for the construction of a chapel, which is the oratory chapel next to the main altar. At the end of the 15th century, the marble support for the main altar was added, which some historians claim is the sarcophagus of Agostino and Giovanni Adorno.

During the 16th and 17th centuries, side chapels were added, often used as tombs. In particular, around 1612, the Spinola family had the chapel of Saint Francesca Romana built, and in 1649, the chapel of the then-Blessed Bernardo Tolomei. In 1933, a partial recovery and restoration of the complex took place. In the late 1980s, the church underwent another restoration: the frescoed columns were recovered, the chapel of the crucifix was restored, some original frescoes on the architraves were uncovered, some paintings in the presbytery were restored, and the crucifix in the chapel of Saint Nicholas was also restored and cleaned.

=== Forced Abandonment and Conversion to Hospital ===
Life continued undisturbed until 1797, when revolutionary movements and the arrival of Napoleon's army drove the monks out of the abbey, which was returned to them in 1815. Attempts to revive the abbey (even funded by King Charles Albert of Sardinia) were thwarted by the laws of 1855, which forced the monks to leave the abbey permanently.

The property was redeemed by the Ecclesiastical Fund in 1859 and was converted into a residence for the "daughters of the house." Around 1900, the daughters were replaced by chronically ill patients, and in 1925, the building was leased to the Little House of Divine Providence (better known as "Little Cottolengo"), which remained there for three years.

=== Restoration ===
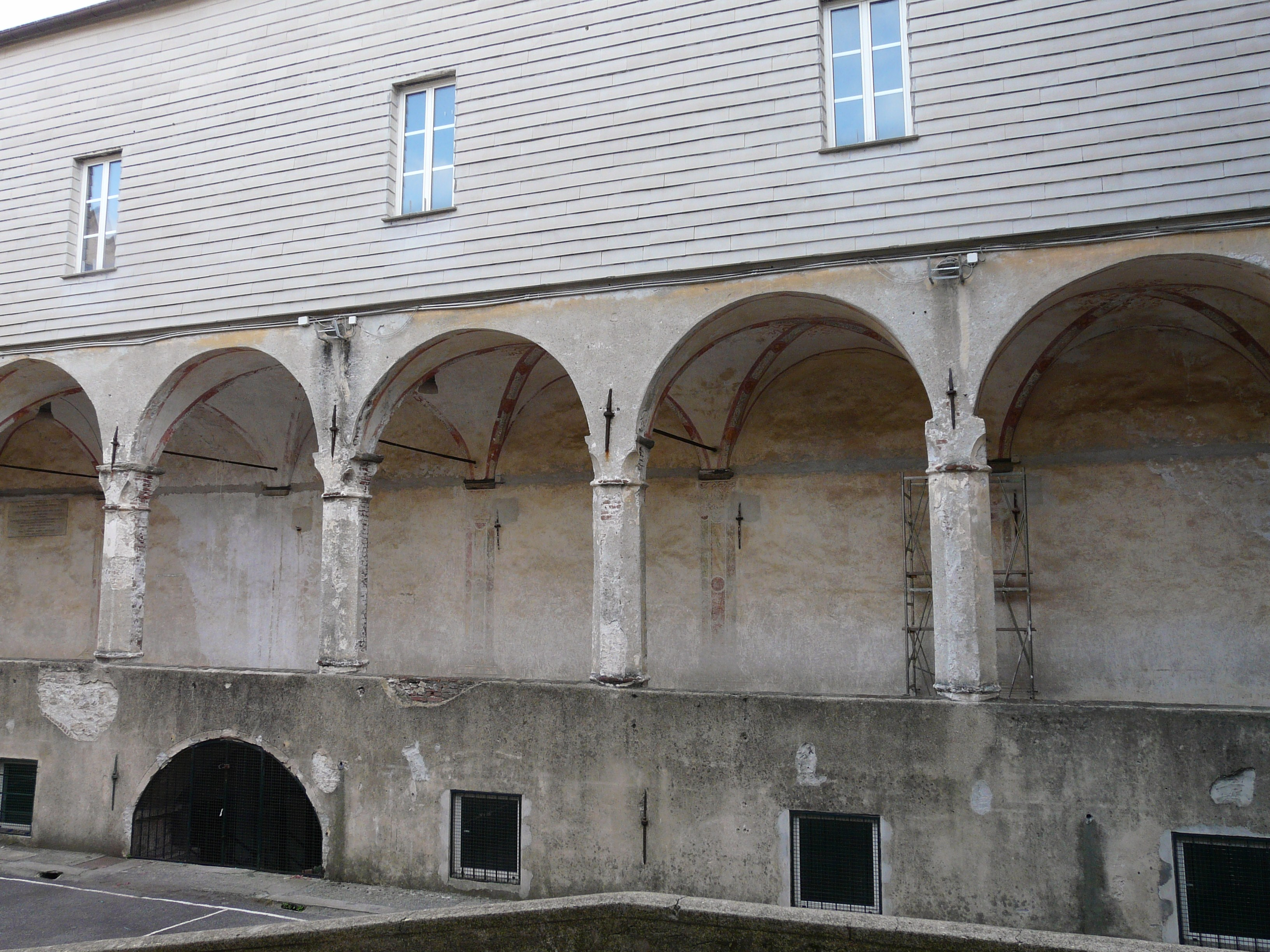
The internal cloister

The year 1933 marked the end of a long and tumultuous period: the San Gerolamo complex was included in a project to restore and renovate hospital buildings. The original architectural style was recovered, new flooring and lighting were installed, and the square in front of the entrance was reorganized.

In 1944, the hospital administration sold the San Gerolamo complex to Count Gerolamo Gaslini, who intended to use the church as a place of worship for the Giannina Gaslini Institute. In the following years, as the population grew, a new parish was needed. Count Gaslini transferred the abbey premises to the Archdiocese of Genoa so that the new parish, established by Cardinal Giuseppe Siri in 1958, could be established there. As a condition for transferring the abbey to the Archdiocese, it was stipulated that the Archbishop of Genoa and his successors would also become the abbots. The church was entrusted to the Capuchin fathers, who had been officiating for the sick since 1924. In 1984, the Capuchin friars were reassigned by the order to other duties, and the parish was entrusted to diocesan priests.

== Architecture ==
The church has a Latin cross plan with three naves, a transept, and a choir. The materials used are very modest due to limited economic means and because the original function of the abbey was that of a hermitage; a wealth of materials and styles would not have been consistent with the life of poverty and prayer that the monks were to lead. The style used for the construction of the church is primarily Gothic, but many elements have been erased by the numerous transformations over time.
