= Abadía del Niño Dios =

Monastery in Argentina

- Interactive map of Abadía del Niño Dios

Monastery information
- Other name: Abadía de Victoria
- Order: Cono-Sur Congregation, Order of Saint Benedict
- Established: 1899
- Mother house: Abbey of Belloc
- Dedication: The Christ Child
- Diocese: Roman Catholic Diocese of Gualeguaychú

People
- Founder: Monks of the Abbey of Belloc
- Abbot: Carlos Martín Oberti
- Prior: Francisco José Robles

Site
- Location: Victoria, Entre Ríos Province, Argentina
- Coordinates: 32°35′58″S 60°10′29″W

Abadía del Niño Dios, Victoria, Entre Ríos Province, Argentina, is a Benedictine monastery of the Cono-Sur Congregation. Upon its establishment in 1899, it became the first Benedictine foundation in Hispanic America. As of 2000, the monastery was home to 42 monks, under the leadership of Abbot Fr Carlos Martín Oberti.

== History ==
Abadía del Niño Dios was founded by monks from the Abbey of Belloc on August 30, 1899, becoming the first Benedictine monastery in Hispanic America. Within four years of its establishment, it was raised to the status of a simple priory. On February 12, 1929, the monastery became an independent abbey. Since then, the community has made a number of foundations in the Cono Sur Region, including the monasteries of Cristo Rey (Tucumán, Argentina) and Pascua (Canelones, Uruguay). In 1982, the monks of Victoria took over supervision of the simple priory of San Benito in Llíu Llíu, Limache, Chile.

== Apostolic work ==
The monks of Abadía del Niño Dios support themselves through various forms of work. The monastery runs a guest house where spiritual direction and sacramental assistance is provided to members of the surrounding area. The monks also staff a training college that offers degrees in a number of fields, including philosophy, theology, and agricultural sciences. Enrollment at the college is 350, while a further 500 students receive instruction from the monks at primary and secondary schools in Victoria proper.

Additionally, the monks market a number of products, including Monacal, a liquor made from 73 medicinal herbs. Additionally, honey, gelatin, wax, homeopathic medicines, and candles are produced by the community.

Finally, some members of the monastic community are engaged in pastoral work in their home diocese, where they offer retreats, provide pastoral assistance to the local bishop, and assist communities of women religious with spiritual direction.

== Personnel ==
As of 2000, the community at Victoria included 42 monks, 16 of whom were ordained priests. The monks of Abadía del Niño Dios are under the leadership of Abbot Fr Carlos Martín Oberti, who is assisted in his duties by Prior Francisco José Robles.

== See also ==
- Order of Saint Benedict
- Cono-Sur Congregation
- Roman Catholicism in Argentina
