= Tigoni Conventual Priory =

Tigoni Abbey
Monastery information
- Other name: Prince of Peace Abbey
- Order: Congregation of Missionary Benedictines of Saint Ottilien, Order of Saint Benedict
- Established: April 6, 1978
- Mother house: Peramiho Abbey
- Diocese: Roman Catholic Archdiocese of Nairobi

People
- Abbot: Fr John Baptist Oese OSB

Site
- Location: Tigoni, Nairobi Province, Kenya

Prince of Peace Abbey, Tigoni, Nairobi Province, Kenya, is a Benedictine monastery of the Congregation of the Missionary Benedictines of Saint Ottilien. Established in 1978 at the request of Maurice Cardinal Otunga, the monastery is currently home to 50 monks. Abbot John Baptist Oese Imai is the community's superior.

== History ==
=== From Peramiho to Kenya ===
From its foundation in 1898, the community of Missionary Benedictines at Peramiho, Tanzania, had sought to evangelize the surrounding population. During the monastery's period as an abbatia nullius, its monks successfully cultivated local vocations to the priesthood. In 1969, Diocese of Songea was created and a local priest ordained bishop. At this point, the monks of Peramiho found themselves at a crossroads. Their duty of primary evangelization had been largely accomplished; now it was time to focus mission efforts elsewhere.

Bishop Emilio Njiru of Eldoret, Kenya, invited the monks of Peramiho Abbey to settle in the northern part of his diocese, in the Kerio Valley, an area that had seen little mission work. The Congregation's 11th General Chapter, meeting in 1971, gave their approval to this idea. The first Missionary Benedictines arrived in the Diocese of Eldoret on February 10, 1972. Soon, they began evangelizing the Pokot and Marakwet, residents of the Kerio Valley. Reflecting previous mission efforts of the Congregation, religious instruction was accompanied by social, educational, and medical services.

The popularity of the Benedictines spread, and in 1977, Maurice Cardinal Otunga of Nairobi invited the monks to make a foundation in the capital city. The monks of Peramiho Abbey were to build a parish in the northern suburbs of Nairobi, including the slums of the Mathare Valley. It was also decided that local vocations would be recruited as soon as the facilities (which were to include a monastery, retreat center, and Christian education center) had been constructed.

=== Consolidating the Foundation ===
The foundation in Nairobi, St Benedict's Monastery, opened on April 6, 1978. In early 1979, construction of the monastery itself began, designed to house a community of 16 monks. At this time, the community began to accept candidates. To ensure that the monastic quality of the house was not overshadowed by the mission apostolate, the Congregation raised the foundation to the status of a simple priory on June 22, 1979. A retreat house and a church were completed in 1982.

Local vocations arrived quickly. A formation house had been established in Nanyuki, 200 km north of Nairobi. By 1981, four local monks had pronounced their vows. By 1984, ten postulants were in formation. Neighboring Uganda proved to be a ready source of vocations. However, the existence of a separate formation house ended up being a disadvantage. Not only did its administration require extra personnel, it also made consolidation of the quickly growing monastic community a challenge. The goal of having a midsized monastery was not being realized either at the Nanyuki formation house or at the Nairobi monastery. In 1988, St Benedict's Monastery in Nairobi was raised to the status of a conventual priory, and Pius Mühlbacher became the community's first conventual prior.

To solve this problem, Cardinal Otunga offered the Missionary Benedictines a large farm in Tigoni, 30 km northwest of Nairobi. In 1987, construction of a new monastery here began; the official day of Tigoni's founding is November 20, 1987. By 1990, quarters for 24 monks had been built. Cardinal Otunga consecrated the monastery's church in 1991. The monastery's properties in Nairobi and Nanyuki were converted to domus religiosa, and the monastic community transferred to Tigoni on June 30, 1992.

Questionable

Magnus Rao.

== Dependencies ==
- St Benedict's Monastery, Nairobi, Archdiocese of Nairobi: Founded in 1978, currently a domus religiosa of Tigoni.
- Our Lady Queen of the World Monastery, Nanyuki, Diocese of Nyeri: Founded in 1979 as a formation house, a domus religiosa on the foothills of Mount Kenya.
- Monastery of St Peter the Fisherman, Ileret, Diocese of Marsabit: Founded in 2005, a domus religiosa on the shores of Lake Turkana.

== Personnel ==
As of September 2020, 26 solemnly professed monks (12 of them priests) resided at Tigoni. At this time, the community also included another 24 monks in various stages of formation.

Abbot John Baptist Oese OSB is the current superior of the monastic community. He was elected and confirmed for a twelve-year term on September 23, 2020.

== See also ==
- Congregation of Missionary Benedictines of Saint Ottilien
- Roman Catholicism in Kenya
- Order of Saint Benedict
