= Santiago, Paraguay =

City in Paraguay

Santiago
- City
- Santiago
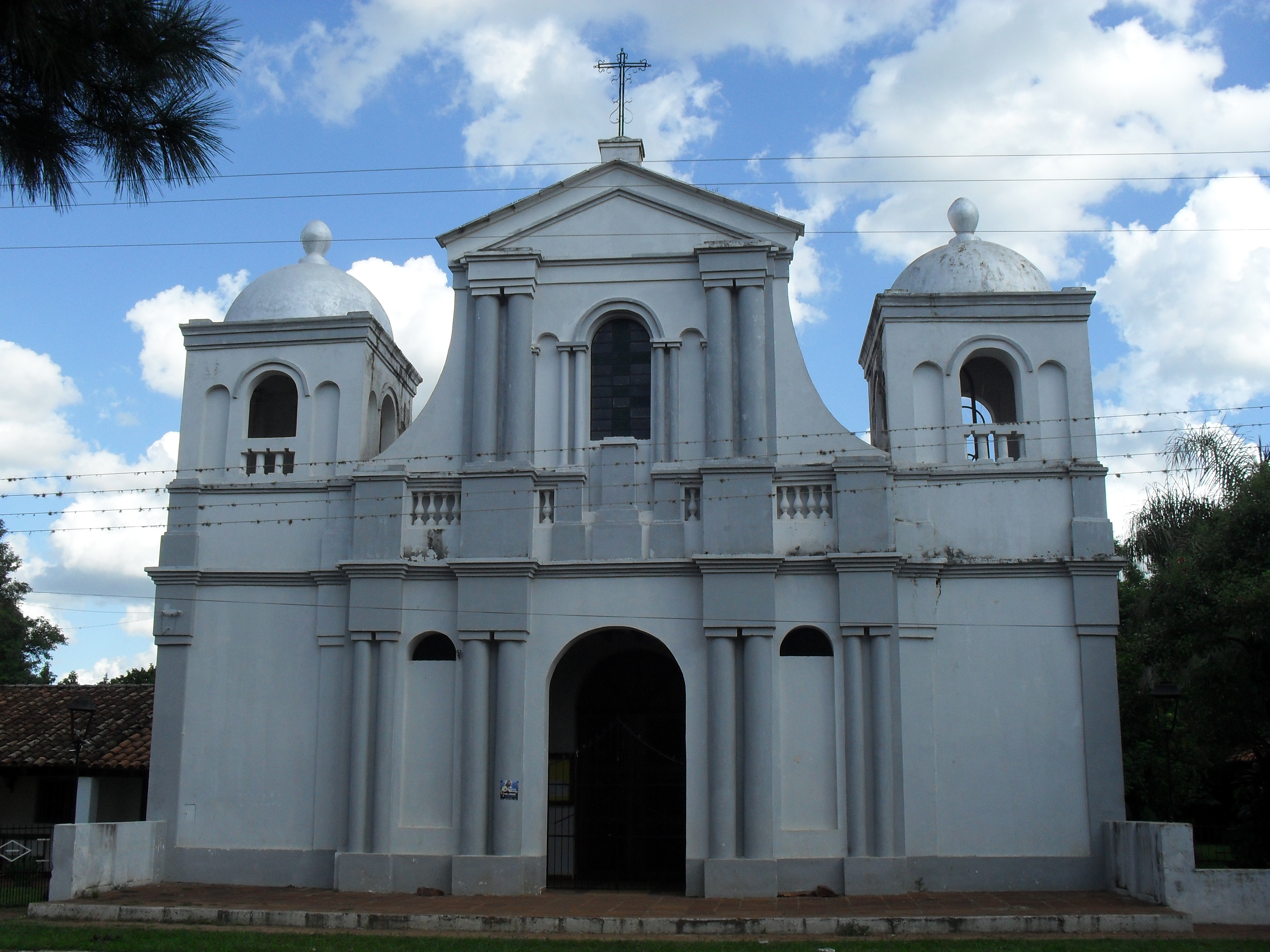
- Iglesia de Santiago

- Location within Paraguay
- Coordinates: 27°9′0″S 56°47′0″W
- Country: Paraguay
- Department: Misiones
- Re-founded: 1669

Government
  - Intendente Municipal: Américo Romero Sanabria (Liberal Party)

Area
  - Total: 740 km^{2} (290 sq mi)
- Elevation: 69 m (226 ft)

Population (2008)
  - Total: 7,702
  - Density: 9/km^{2} (23/sq mi)
- Time zone: UTC−04:00
- Code Postal: 4860
- Area code: (595) (782)

Santiago is a city in Paraguay, located in the Misiones Department in the south of the country.

== Toponym ==
Originally named San Ignacio de Caaguazú, it was re-founded in the Misiones department, Paraguay, in 1669 with the name of Santiago Apostol.

== History ==
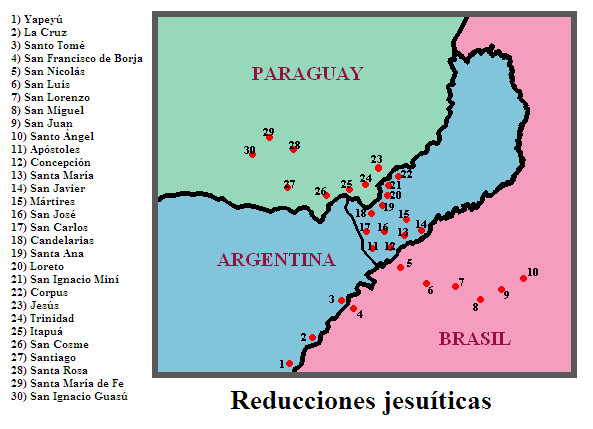
Jesuit Reductions in the zone of Misiones

Santiago is an old Jesuit mission city and today still preserves many characteristics of colonial times, like its large main square, the "house of the Indians" and a museum that preserves objects of art from colonial times. During colonial times, Santiago had a population of about 3,000 inhabitants.

During the holidays, it organized the Opera of Santiago.

== Geography ==
Santiago is located 278 kilometers from Asunción, the capital Paraguay. It is located on a hill between the cities of Ayolas and San Patricio.

The geography of Santiago is characterized by rolling hills, forests, and grasslands. The city is surrounded by dense forests and agricultural land, with the Paraguayan Chaco to the west and the Paraná Plateau to the east.

The Tebicuary River is an important part of the geography of Santiago, providing a source of water for agriculture and transportation. The river is also home to a variety of fish species, which support the local fishing industry.

== Climate ==
In summer, the temperature reaches 39 °C, and in winter can drop to 0 °C. The average annual temperature is 21 °C.

The climate of Santiago is subtropical, Santiago has relatively stable warm temperatures for most of the year. There are also frequent waves of cool air from the south. This can cause the weather to alternate between clear and stormy conditions quickly. During the winter months some days and nights can be close to freezing temperatures. However most winter days are usually cool to mild. Santiago rarely sees multiple days with below freezing temperatures in any given winter. There is a distinct rainy season from October to April. This ensures the region receives ample rainfall, which supports the growth of lush vegetation and crops.

== Demographics ==
Santiago has a population of 7,702 inhabitants, 4,017 men and 3,685 women, according to the General Direction of Polls, Statistics and Census.
