= Diepenveen =

- Village
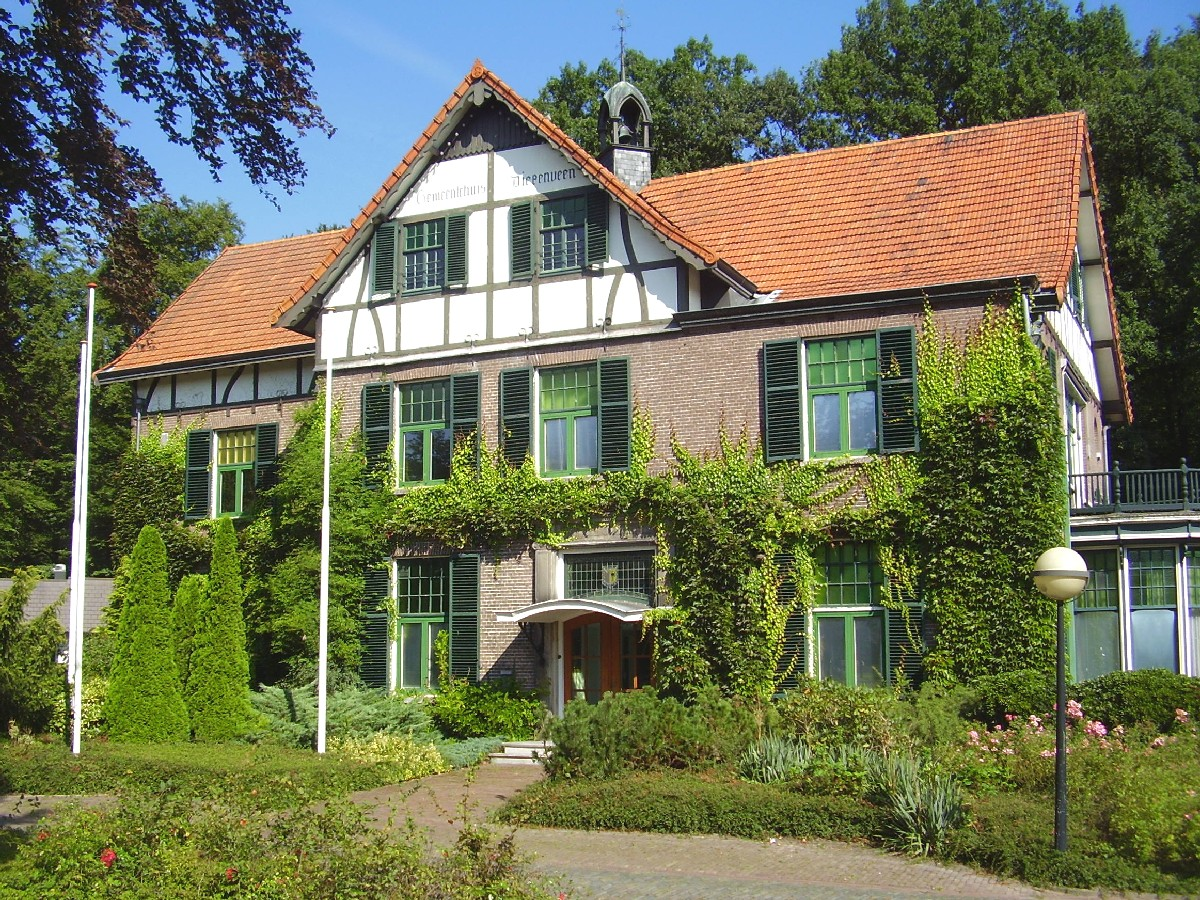
- Former town hall of Diepenveen in Schalkhaar

- Flag Coat of arms

- Location in the Netherlands Diepenveen (Netherlands)
- Coordinates: 52°17′22″N 6°9′0″E
- Country: Netherlands
- Province: Overijssel
- Municipality: Deventer

Area
  - Total: 4.78 km^{2} (1.85 sq mi)
- Elevation: 6 m (20 ft)

Population (2021)
  - Total: 4,460
  - Density: 933/km^{2} (2,420/sq mi)
- Time zone: UTC+1 (CET)
  - Summer (DST): UTC+2 (CEST)
- Postal code: 7430-7431
- Dialing code: 0570
- Major roads: N337, N766

Diepenveen is a village in the eastern Netherlands. It is located in the municipality of Deventer, Overijssel, about 4 km north of the city centre.

== History ==
The village was first mentioned in 1417 as Diepenveen, and means "low lying peat". Diepenveen is a village on a sand hill which developed around the Augustinian nunnery which was founded in 1408. The monastery was destroyed during the Siege of Deventer in 1578 by George de Lalaing, Count of Rennenberg.

The church of monastery was taken by the Dutch Reformed Church in 1659. The building dates between 1409 and 1411. It was restored in 1720 and again in 1838.

The havezate (manor house) Oud Rande was originally built in the 15th century. Between 1570 and 1580, a new estate was built by Willem van Doetinchem. The estate was demolished in 1838, however the tower from 1574 has remained.

Diepenveen was home to 274 people in 1840. Deventer tried to annex Diepenveen several times and it had lost quite a lot of territory to its neighbour, however it was a separate municipality until 1999, when it became a part of Deventer.

== Notable people ==
- Hanneke de Vries (1960), long track speed skater

== Gallery ==
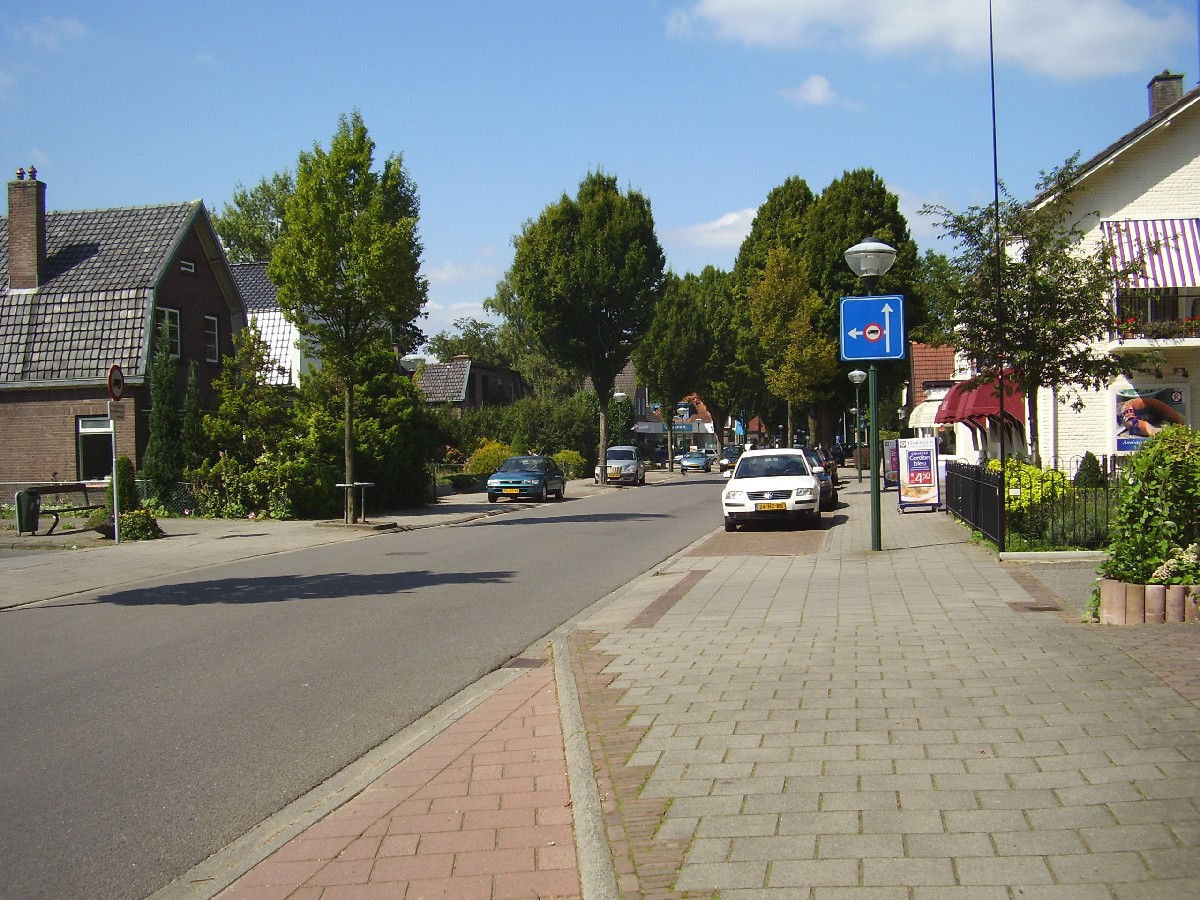
Dorpsstraat, Diepenveen

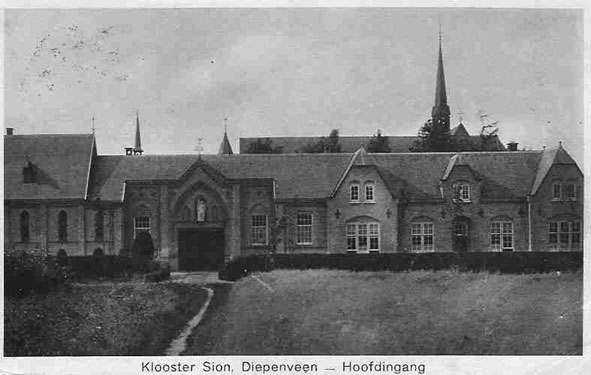
Zion Monastery, Diepenveen in 1929
