= Los Toldos =

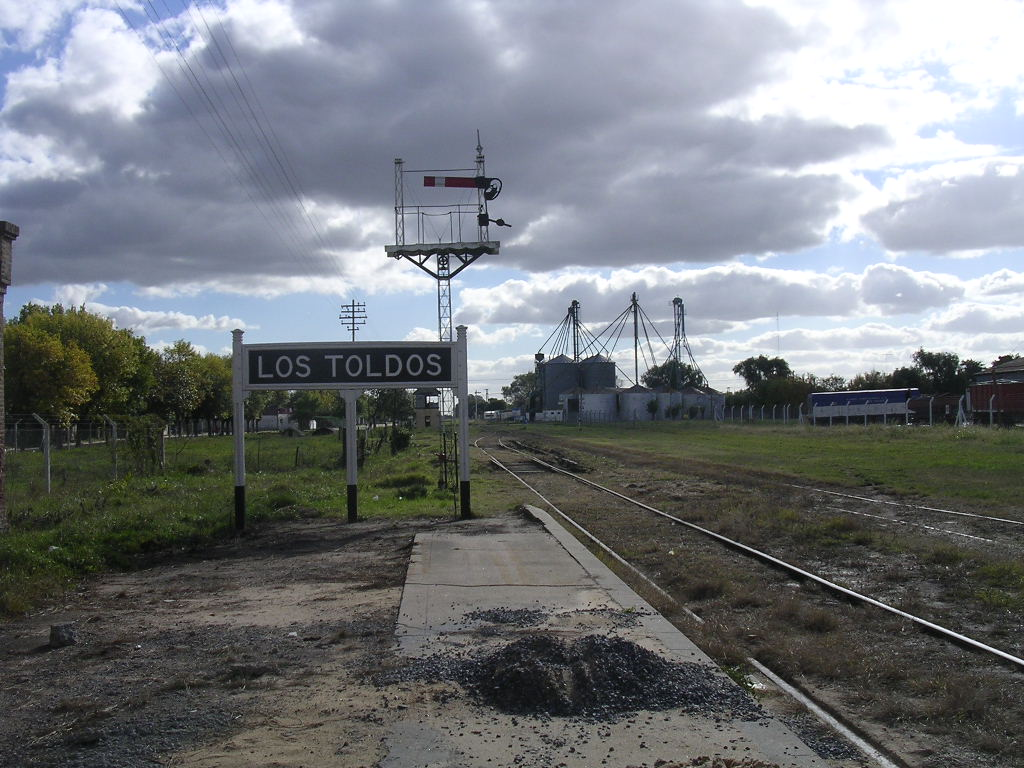
- FF.CC. Los Toldos Train Station

- Location in Argentina Los Toldos (Argentina)
- Coordinates: 34°59′S 61°02′W
- Country: Argentina
- Province: Buenos Aires
- Partido: General Viamonte
- Elevation: 73 m (240 ft)

Population (2001 census [INDEC])
  - Total: 13,462
- CPA Base: B 6015
- Area code: +54 2358

Los Toldos (Sometimes referred to as General Viamonte) is a small town in Buenos Aires Province, Argentina, situated in General Viamonte Partido, which developed around a station of the same name on the Buenos Aires Western Railway. It is located at 310 km (193 mi) from the city of Buenos Aires and had about 13,400 inhabitants in 2001.

It is most famous as the birthplace of Argentine First Lady Eva Perón in 1919.

The town of Los Toldos is home to an Indigenous Mapuche colony.

== Tourist attractions ==
- Parque Balneario Municipal (Municipal Balneario Park)
- (in Spanish) Carnaval de Los Toldos
- Laguna La Azotea or Rehue
- (in Spanish) La Casa de María Eva Duarte de Perón (María Eva Duarte de Perón's House)
- Monasterio Benedictino Santa María (Benedictine Monastery of St Mary)
- Monumento al Indio (Indian Monument)
- Plaza Bernardino Rivadavia (Bernardino Rivadavia Square)
- Iglesia Nuestra Señora del Pilar (Nuestra Señora del Pilar Church)
- Monasterio Hermanas de la Santa Cruz (Hermanas de la Santa Cruz Monastery)
- Museo de Artes e Historia de Los Toldos (Los Toldos Museum of Art and History)
- Aeroclub General Viamonte
- Vivero Escuela de Educación Especial Nº 501
