= Yevgeniy Zinkovskiy =

Kazakh Roman Catholic prelate

The Most Reverend Yevgeniy Zinkovskiy
- Titular Bishop of Maiuca, Auxiliary Bishop of Diocese of Karaganda
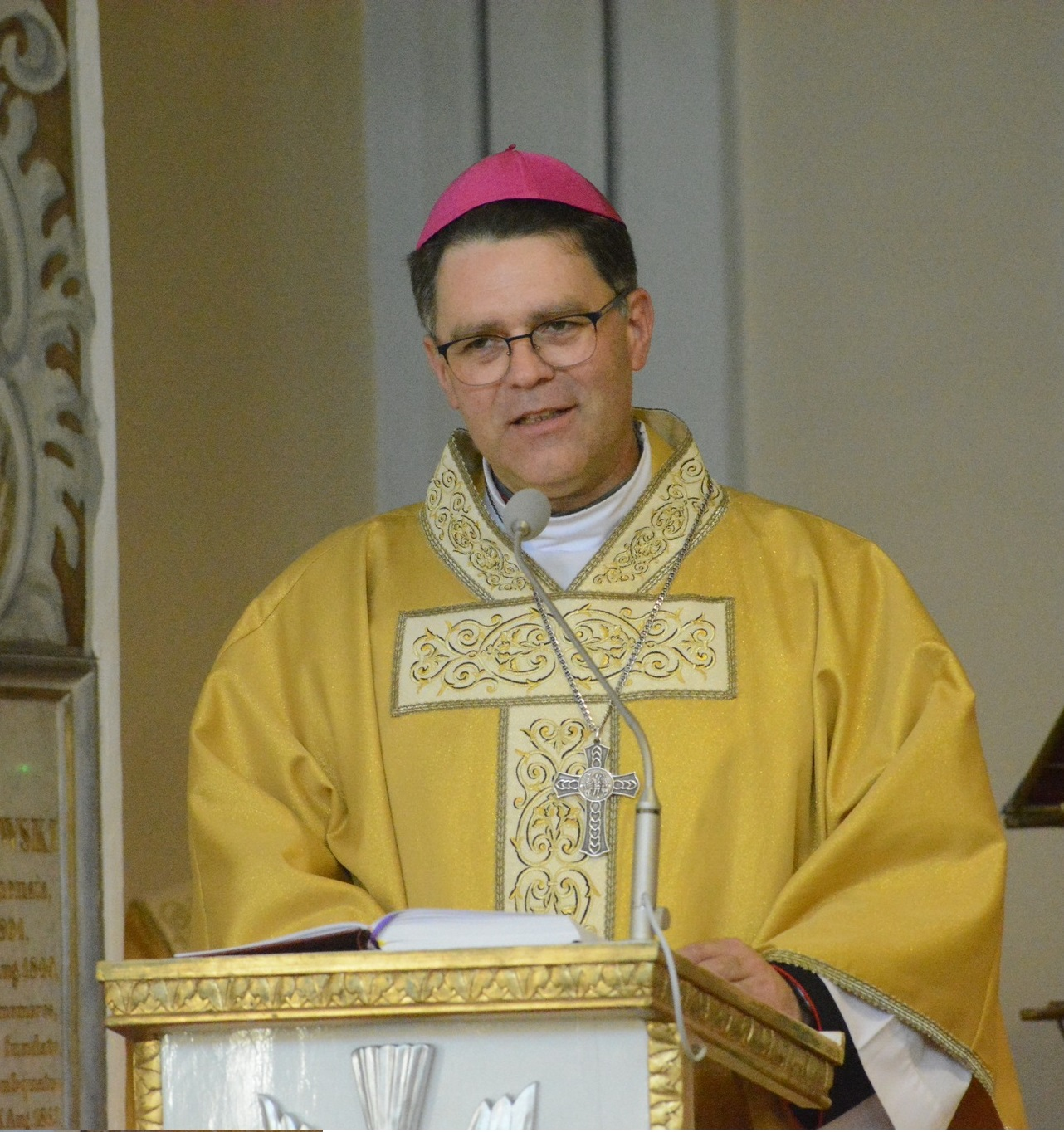
- Church: Roman Catholic Church
- Appointed: 29 June 2021
- Other post: Vicar General of the Diocese of Karaganda (since 2015)

Orders
- Ordination: 1 August 1999
- Consecration: 12 September 2021 by Adelio Dell'Oro

Personal details
- Born: Yevgeniy Zinkovskiy; 27 July 1975 (age 51) Shortandy, Tselinograd Region, Kazakh SSR
- Education: Major Theological Seminary in Gniezno, Pontifical University of the Holy Cross, Pontifical University of John Paul II

Bishop Yevgeniy Zinkovskiy (Kazakh: Евгений Зинковский; born 27 July 1975) is a Kazakh Roman Catholic prelate, who currently serves as the Titular Bishop of Maiuca and Auxiliary bishop of the Roman Catholic Diocese of Karaganda since 29 June 2021.

== Early life and education ==
Zinkovskiy was born in the present day Akmola Region in a family of a Polish descents. His grandparents were forcibly deported by the Soviets from present day Western Ukraine. His family emigrated to Poland in 1997.

After graduation of the school education in Shortandy, he joined Major Theological Seminary in Gniezno, Poland (1992–1998) and was ordained as a priest for the Diocese of Karaganda on 1 August 1999, after completed his philosophical and theological studies.

== Pastoral and educational work ==
He returned to Kazakhstan and began to work in the formational and pastoral camps. Fr. Zinkovskiy was a prefect in the Major Theological Seminary in Karaganda (1998–1999) and assistant priest in the St. Joseph parish in Maikuduk (1999–2001), with the break during 2001–2003, when he studied at the Pontifical University of the Holy Cross in Rome, Italy with the licentiate of the philosophy degree. Returning to Karaganda, he was appointed a lecturer of philosophy at the Interdiocesan Seminary. At the same time, in 2003–2011, he served as a parish priest, first in Balkhash (2003–2009), and then in Temirtau (2009–2011).

In 2011, Fr. Yevgeniy was appointed chancellor of the diocesan curia and editor-in-chief of the Kazakh Catholic magazine Credo. During 2014–2015, he was also the diocesan administrator of the Diocese of Karaganda, during vacancy of this see.

Since 2015 Fr. Zinkovskiy holds the positions of vicar general and chancellor of the curia of the Diocese of Karaganda. In 2018, he received his Doctor of Philosophy degree from the Pontifical University of John Paul II in Kraków, Poland.

== Prelate ==
On 29 June 2021 Fr. Zinkovskiy was appointed by Pope Francis as an auxiliary bishop of the Roman Catholic Diocese of Karaganda and Titular Bishop of Maiuca. On 12 September 2021 he was consecrated as bishop by Bishop Adelio Dell'Oro and other prelates of the Roman Catholic Church in the Cathedral of Our Lady of Fatima in Karaganda.

On 29 April 2022 he was elected the General Secretary of the newly created Bishops' Conference of Central Asia.

Catholic Church titles
Preceded by Jan Stefan Gałecki	Titular Bishop of Maiuca; 2021–	Incumbent
