= List of Catholic dioceses in Central Asia =

The Catholic church in Central Asia (the five ex-Soviet republics of western Turkestan, where Islam is very dominant) comprises solely a Latin hierarchy, consisting of:

- a Latin ecclesiastical province in Kazakhstan as a joint national episcopal conference with the (non-exempt) Apostolic Administration of Atyrau.
- four exempt pre-diocesan jurisdictions (two apostolic administrations and two independent missions), without province or episcopal conference, one for the each of other four republics.

They are all members of the Federation of Asian Bishops’ Conferences (F.A.B.C.), which as the name suggests consists mainly of episcopates from countries with national episcopal conferences.

There are no Eastern Catholic jurisdictions (although Nestorianism still remains in the region).

There is an Apostolic Nunciature to Kazakhstan as papal diplomatic representation (embassy-level), in the national capital Astana, into which are also vested the formal Apostolic Nunciatures to Kyrgyzstan and to Tajikistan.

There is an Apostolic Nunciature to Uzbekistan as papal diplomatic representation (embassy-level), in the national capital Tashkent.

There is formally an Apostolic Nunciature to Turkmenistan, but it's vested in the Apostolic Nunciature to Turkey, in its capital Ankara.

== Current Latin jurisdictions ==
=== Exempt, pre-diocesan jurisdictions ===
(all directly dependent on the Holy See, and notably its missionary Roman Congregation for the Evangelization of Peoples)

- Apostolic Administration of Kyrgyzstan, in Bishkek, for all Kyrgyzstan
- Apostolic Administration of Uzbekistan, in Tashkent, for all Uzbekistan
- Mission sui juris of Tajikistan, for all Tajikistan
- Mission sui juris of Turkmenistan, in Asgabat, for all Turkmenistan

=== Ecclesiastical Province of Astana ===
covering all of Kazakhstan, including a pre-diocesan yet suffragan see

- Metropolitan Archdiocese of Mary Most Holy in Astana
  - Diocese of Most Holy Trinity in Almaty
  - Diocese of Karaganda
  - Apostolic Administration of Atyrau

== Defunct jurisdictions ==
There are no titular sees.

Nearly all defunct jurisdictions (mostly promoted) have current Latin successor sees, except :

- Latin Diocese of Samarcanda, 14th century, with see at Samarkand, in present Uzbekistan

== See also ==
- List of Catholic dioceses (structured view)

== Sources and external links ==
- GCatholic - Kazachstan
- GCatholic - Kyrgyzstan
- GCatholic - Tajikistan
- GCatholic - Turkmenistan
- GCatholic - Uzbekistan
