= Władysław Bukowiński =

Polish Roman Catholic priest

Blessed Władysław Bukowiński
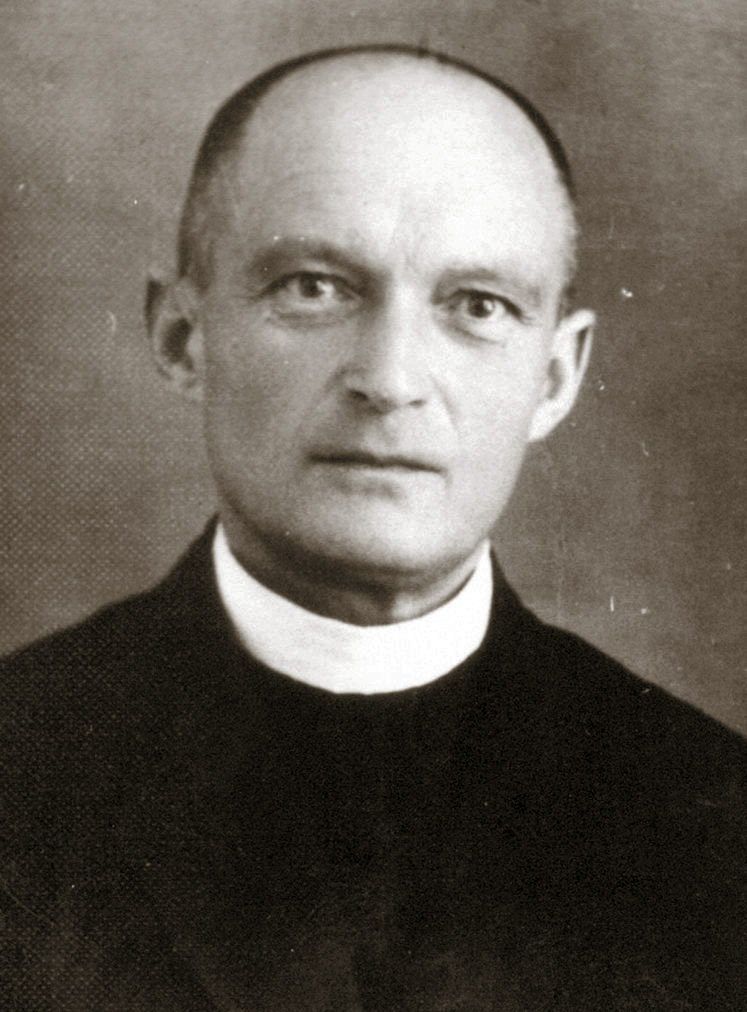
- Bukowiński prior to 1945.
- Born: 22 December 1904; Berdychiv, Russian Empire
- Died: 3 December 1974 (aged 69); Karaganda, Kazakh SSR, Soviet Union
- Resting place: Cathedral of Our Lady of Fátima, Karaganda, Kazakhstan
- Venerated in: Roman Catholic Church
- Beatified: 11 September 2016, Cathedral of Our Lady of Fátima, Karaganda, Kazakhstan by Cardinal Angelo Amato
- Feast: 20 June
- Patronage: Prisoners; Missionaries; Diocese of Karaganda; Dialogue with Islam

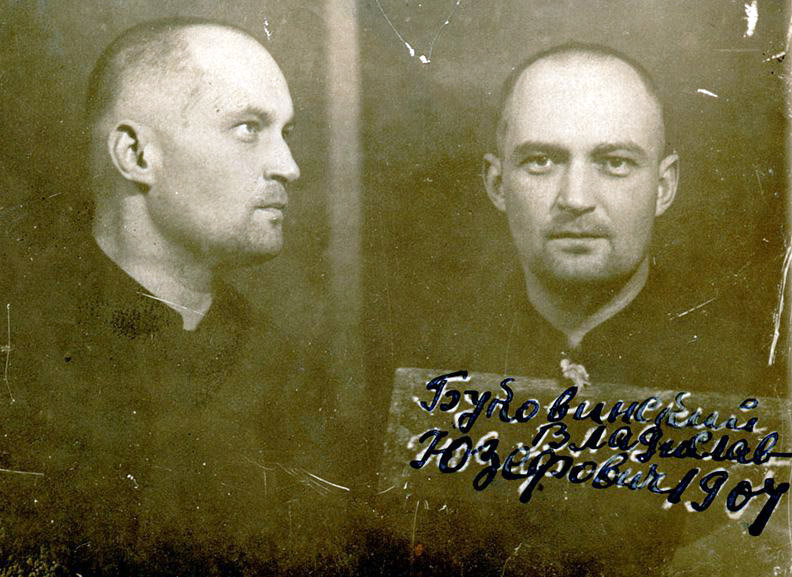
Władysław Bukowiński after arrest by NKVD

Władysław Bukowiński (also known as Ladislao Bukowinski; 22 December 1904 – 3 December 1974), was a Polish Roman Catholic priest who served in the diocese of Karaganda in Kazakhstan. He served in Poland during World War II and became renowned among his parishioners for his calmness and his intelligence. He made an effort to meet the conflict with the love of Jesus Christ and the message of the Gospel. He was arrested on several occasions and was a prisoner for a time in a Soviet gulag. After he was released, he served a long-term mission in Kazakhstan.

Pope Francis proclaimed him to be venerable in 2015 upon the confirmation of his life of heroic virtue, and approved a miracle attributed to him twelve months later. His beatification, in which Cardinal Angelo Amato presided on behalf of the pontiff, was celebrated on 11 September 2016 in Karaganda where he had served.

== Life ==
=== Childhood and education ===
Władysław Bukowiński was born on 22 December 1904 in nowadays Ukraine (then in Russian Empire) but was an ethnic Pole. He was the eldest son of Jozef Cyprian Bukowiński (16 March 1874 – 15 September 1952) and Jadwiga Monika Scipio del Campo (1885–1918) and was the brother of Gustav and Irene Bukowiński-Davidovskaya (d. 1930). He was baptized on 26 December in the church of Saint Barbara with the names of "Władysław Antoni". He had a half-brother named Zygmunt (d. 1982). Following his mother's death, his father married her sister, Victoria Scipio del Campo.

He spent his childhood in a Ukrainian region until 1912 when he relocated to Opatów. (He moved again in 1920 after the death of his mother and the remarriage of his father.) In 1914, he began his education in Kiev and then studied in Podolia until 1917 when he began to attend a coed Polish grammar school in Płoskirow. In 1920, the Bolshevik invasion caused him to move with his family to the village of Sandomierz.

On 24 September 1921, he passed his examinations in Kraków and began preparations to study theology. He studied law in addition to his theological studies at the Jagiellonian University, and in 1925, was one of the founders of Praetoria (Polish Academic Corporation) in Kraków. He served as its editor from 1925 to 1926. During the course of his studies, he published three papers on the history of medieval law; two of these papers received awards from the competent faculty. From 1923 until 1925, he studied and graduated with honors from the Polish School of Political Science in the Faculty of Law at the university. He belonged to the Academic Borderland while serving two consecutive terms as its president. He graduated on 24 June 1926 and was awarded a Master of Law.

=== Priesthood and arrests ===
Bukowiński's call to join the ecclesiastical life came when he met a cleric and then decided to begin his theological studies in 1926. He was ordained to the priesthood in the diocese of Kraków, Poland, on 28 June 1931 by Cardinal Adam Stefan Sapieha, and served as a vicar between 1 September 1931 to 20 June 1935. He served as a catechist in Rabka in that same period. He served as a vicar and catechist in Sucha Beskidzka from 1935 until 1936 at which time he was reassigned. He left for Łucka in August 1936 and worked there until January 1945; he worked alongside Polish immigrants as well as both political and criminal prisoners. It was back in Rabka that he founded the academic association "Revival" for young students.

From 18 August 1936 to 1939, he taught sociology and catechism at the major seminary there at his own request, and was the general secretary of the Diocesan Institute of Catholic Action from 1938, while simultaneously serving as the director of the Higher Institute of Religious Sciences and the deputy editor of The Catholic Life.

At the outbreak of World War II in 1939, the Bishop of Łuck appointed him as a pastor of the main cathedral on 17 September 1939, where he became known for his calmness in the face of war as well as for his intelligence and spiritual values in the defense of the freedom of religion. He became an outstanding preacher and he became a well-known figure to the faithful.

== Persecution ==
He was arrested by the NKVD (Soviet Secret Police Organization) on 22 August 1940, and sentenced to eight years of hard labour for the crime of being a priest in a Communist-controlled area. When Germany invaded the Soviet Union, the NKVD began to massacre prisoners, and though he was sentenced to that fate with other prisoners on 23 June 1941, he was not killed. He was released when the German army overran the area. He resumed his pastoral work which included hiding Jewish children with Catholic families.

He was arrested a second time on the evening of 3 January 1945, along with the priests of the diocese and Bishop Adolf Szelążek. On 22 January 1945, he and his fellow captives were relocated to Kovel and then to Kiev where they were imprisoned until June that same year, when all were accused of treason. In July 1946, he was sentenced to a decade in the gulag, meaning more hard labour in the mines of Karaganda, Kazakhstan. He spent his time in prison ministering to other prisoners.

In November 1947, he was transferred to another prison where he contracted severe pneumonia and was taken to the hospital under guard before being sent back to prison. He was sent to another camp in 1950. During his imprisonment, he administered the sacraments and visited the sick.

On 10 August 1954, he was released from the camp and ordered to remain in exile in Karaganda, Kazakh Soviet Socialist Republic. He worked as a watchman at a construction site and was the first Catholic priest to arrive in the nation; he secretly celebrated Mass in private homes with curtained windows in order to avoid detection. As an exile, he was obligated to report to a police station each month and, in June 1955, rejected a proposition put forth that he return to Poland. He became a Soviet citizen in June 1955 instead. In May 1956, he received his passport and then resigned as a watchman to return to his priestly duties.

He was in Alma-Ata in June 1957 to aid Polish displaced people, though on 3 December 1958 he was arrested, and on 25 February 1959 was subjected to a hearing and accused of illegal actions that prompted him to defend himself with a speech he composed; the verdict was for three years in a labour camp at Irkutsk. He remained there from March 1959 until June 1961 when he was transferred to another camp on 3 December 1961. He returned to Karaganda in 1962 and continued his pastoral duties.

=== Final years and death ===
He visited Poland three times between 1963 and 1973 where he met with the Archbishop of Kraków Karol Józef Wojtyła - the future pope. But during his visits to Poland, he was the subject of surveillance by the Communist secret service forces. In 1965, the Polish authorities granted him permission to return to visit his relatives and he then returned to Karaganda on 31 August. Bukowiński travelled on a mission to Tajikistan in December 1967, and it was his last visit due to poor health. He returned from that mission on 3 March 1968, where he continued his work after a week of battling an illness. He travelled again to Poland in September 1969 and was there for a month before returning on 16 December 1969; he came back to Poland in December 1972, where he spent time in a hospital for treatment.

Bukowiński spent two months in the hospital in Poland until he returned to Karaganda on 19 April 1973, and settled in August 1974 with a widow Teresa Bitz. In October 1974, he spent a period of rest in Wierzbowca with the priest Józef Kuczynski. He then spent time that same October with the priest Antoni Chomicki who invited him to Murafa. The priest celebrated his final Mass on 25 November 1974 and then received the sacraments for the last time from Alexander Chiry.

He died, with a rosary in his hands, on 3 December 1974 in a Karaganda hospital at 5:00 pm due to a hemorrhage. His relics (remains) were later enshrined in the Karaganda Cathedral in 2008. The funeral was celebrated on 7 December at a new cemetery located just outside the town where a marble grave was erected with an inscription in Polish and German.

== Legacy ==
Commander's Cross

On 13 November 2011, he was granted the posthumous award of Commander's Cross with the Star of the Order of the Rebirth of Poland. It was given to the Bishop of Karaganda Janusz Kaleta.

== Beatification ==
The beatification process commenced in 2005; the cause was transferred from Karaganda to Kraków on 28 February 2005 and the Congregation for the Causes of Saints granted their approval to the cause three months later on 16 May 2005, titling Bukowiński a Servant of God. The diocesan process spanned from 19 June 2006 until 8 March 2008. The process was validated on 6 February 2009 which allowed for the positio to be submitted in 2012. Theologians approved the cause on 22 November 2013. Pope Francis recognized that Bukowiński had lived a life of heroic virtue on 22 January 2015 and proclaimed Bukowiński to be venerable.

A miracle was investigated in Karaganda from 22–31 May 2013 and validated in Rome on 22 November 2013; the miracle was Mariusz Kowalski's healing of a brain hemorrhage that took place in 2008. It received the approval of the Rome-based medical board and received the approval of theologians on 10 September 2015. Pope Francis approved it on 14 December 2015 which allowed for his beatification to take place; it was celebrated on 11 September 2016 in Karaganda and Cardinal Angelo Amato presided over the celebration on the pope's behalf. Over a thousand pilgrims attended the beatification from places such as Belarus and Russia, while around fifteen bishops were in attendance. The postulator assigned to the cause is Jan Nowak.
