= Cathedral of Our Lady of Fatima, Karaganda =

Coordinates: 49.7813°N 73.1348°E

Cathedral of Our Lady of Fatima
- Собор Пресвятой Девы Марии Фатимской
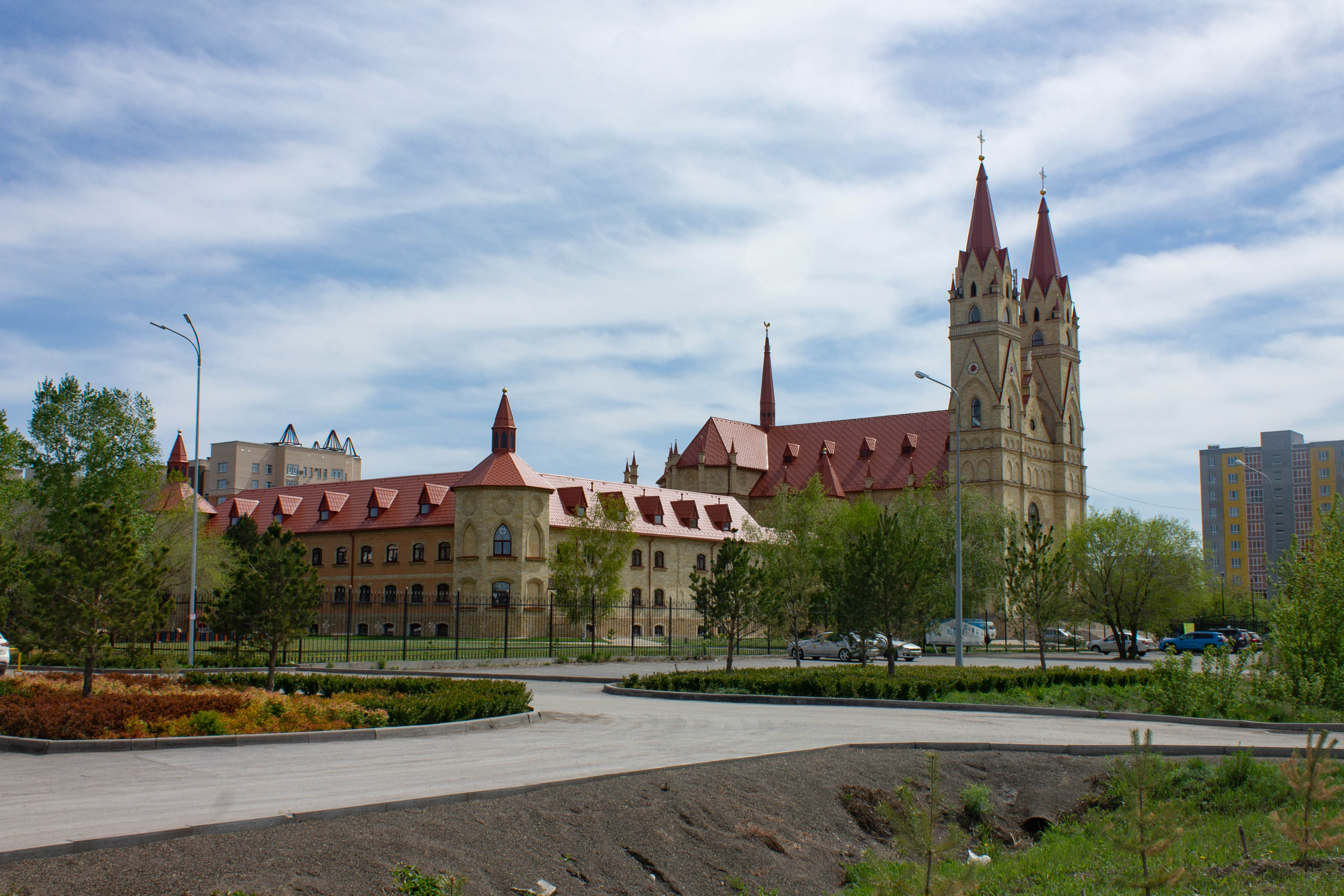
- Cathedral of Our Lady of Fatima
- Country: Kazakhstan
- Denomination: Catholic Church

History
- Founded: 2012

The Cathedral of Our Lady of Fatima (Russian: Собор Пресвятой Девы Марии Фатимской, Sobor Presvyatoy Devy Marii Fatimskoy, Kazakh: Әулие Фатима Мариямның шіркеу, romanized: Äulie Fatima Mariiamnyñ şırkeu) is a Catholic cathedral in neo-Gothic style. It is the seat of the Diocese of Karaganda, Kazakhstan. It was built between 2003 and 2012, and was consecrated by Cardinal Angelo Sodano on September 9, 2012.

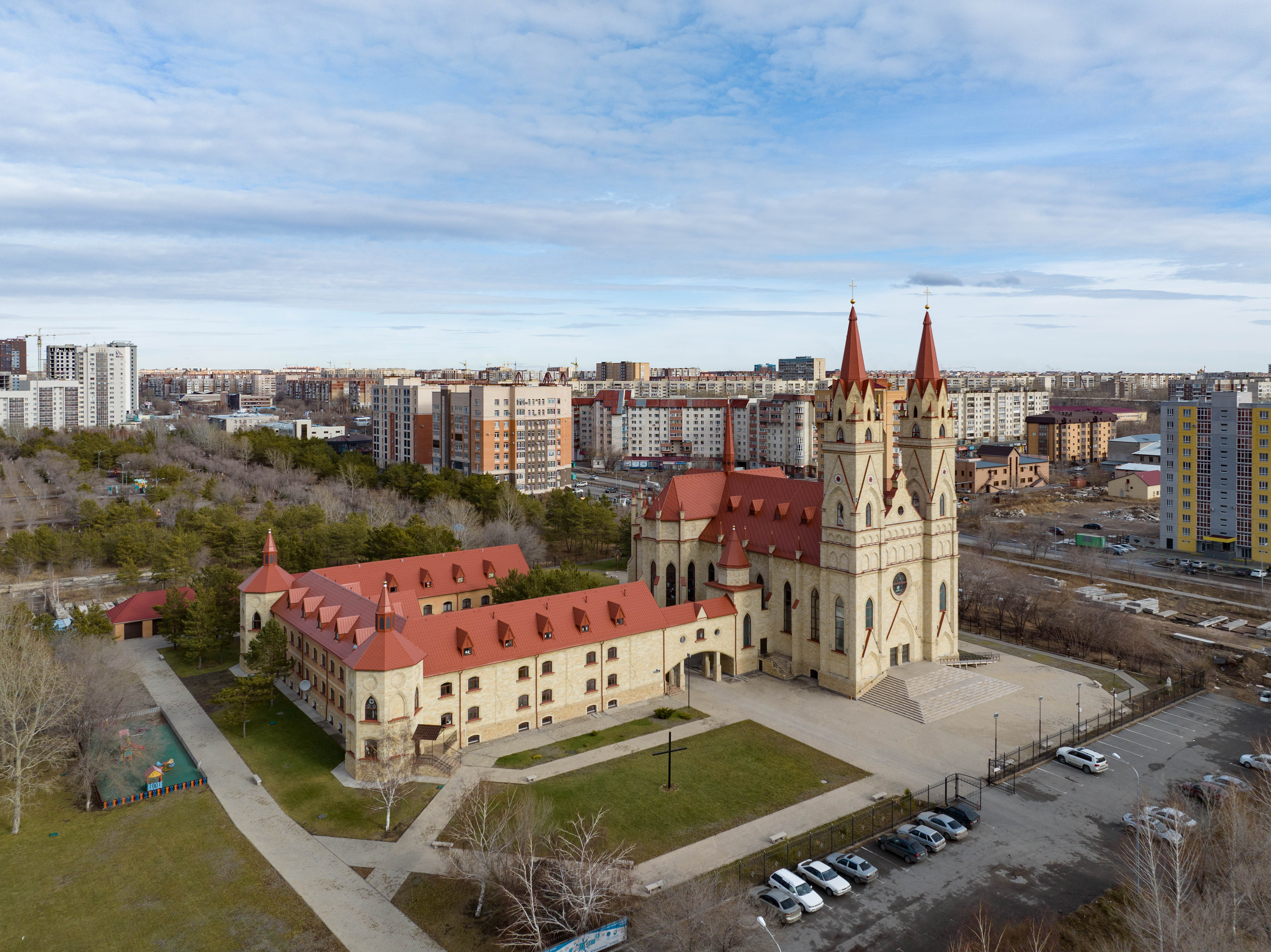
Cathedral of Our Lady of Fatima

In 2003, Bishop Lenga, Apostolic Administrator of Karaganda, obtained permission from the authorities to acquire land for the construction of a new cathedral. This decision was made because the old seat of the Diocese of Karaganda, the Minor Basilica of St. Joseph, is small in size. The work was financed by donations from abroad to honor victims of the persecutions of the communist regime that sent many priests and lay Catholics to the correctional complex Karlag. Carried out under the neo-Gothic style, it was built according to Vladimir Sergeyev's plans. Bishop Schneider actively participated in the search for funding from Germany.

== See also ==
- Cathedral of Our Lady of Fatima, Cairo
- Cathedral Of Our Lady Of Fatima, Maputo
- Catholic Church in Kazakhstan
- Persecution of Christians in the Soviet Union
