= Amoris laetitia =

2016 apostolic exhortation of Pope Francis

Amoris laetitia Latin for 'The Joy of Love' Apostolic exhortation of Pope Francis
- Signature date: 19 March 2016
- Subject: On love in the family
- Pages: 256
- Number: 2 of 7 of the pontificate
- Text: In Latin; In English

Amoris laetitia (The Joy of Love) is a post-synodal apostolic exhortation by Pope Francis addressing the pastoral care of families. Dated 19 March 2016, it was released on 8 April 2016. It follows the Synods on the Family held in 2014 and 2015. (Note: The two synods are known formally as the Third Extraordinary General Assembly of the Synod of Bishops and the Fourteenth Ordinary General Assembly of the Synod of Bishops.)

The exhortation covers a wide range of topics related to marriage and family life as well as the contemporary challenges faced by families throughout the world. It encourages both pastors and laypeople to accompany and care for families and others in situations of particular need. Amoris laetitia also includes an extended reflection on the meaning of love in the day-to-day reality of family life.

Controversy arose following the publication of Amoris laetitia regarding whether Chapter 8 of the exhortation had changed the Catholic Church's sacramental discipline concerning access to the sacraments of Reconciliation and the Eucharist for divorced persons who have civilly remarried.

== Background ==
=== Catholic teaching on marriage ===
==== Doctrine ====
The Catholic Church holds that marriage is a sacrament creating an indissoluble union between one man and one woman. While the Catholic Church allows for the possibility of separation from a marriage in certain cases, it does not recognize the validity of a subsequent marriage unless a declaration of nullity has been obtained regarding the first marriage or the first spouse is deceased. Any sexual act outside of marriage is considered a grave sin, and if the subjective elements of full knowledge and deliberate consent are present in an individual committing such an act, the individual would be deemed to have committed a mortal sin and would be deprived of access to Holy Communion until they have received sacramental absolution.

==== Canon law ====
The 1917 Code of Canon Law stated:

Bigamists who, in violation of the rights of their lawful partner, live in concubinage with another party, are after having been admonished without avail to be punished with personal interdict or with excommunication.

Canon 915 of the 1983 Code of Canon Law states that persons "obstinately persevering in manifest grave sin are not to be admitted to Holy Communion". In 2000, the Pontifical Council for Legislative Texts (PCLT) released a declaration which states that canon 915 applies to the divorced and civilly remarried. According to the PCLT, this prohibition "is derived from divine law" and based on the canonical notion of "scandal", which exists even if this kind of behaviour "no longer arouses surprise". Given the divine nature of this prohibition, "no ecclesiastical authority may dispense the minister of Holy Communion from this obligation in any case, nor may he emanate directives that contradict it". If the divorced and civilly remarried are not able to separate for serious reasons, such as the upbringing of children, and they assume the task of living in full continence, they can only receive the Communion privately ("remoto scandalo"), in order to avoid scandal.

==== Magisterial development ====
On 11 April 1973, Cardinal Franjo Šeper, Prefect of the Congregation for the Doctrine of the Faith (CDF), wrote to the president of the National Conference of Catholic Bishops (in the U.S.), "In regard to admission to the Sacraments the Ordinaries are asked on the one hand to stress observance of current discipline and, on the other hand, to take care that the pastors of souls exercise special care to seek out those who are living in an irregular union by applying to the solution of such cases, in addition to other right means, the Church's approved practice in the internal forum (probatam Ecclesiae praxim in foro interno)." Following a request for clarification, on 21 March 1975, then Archbishop Jean Jérôme Hamer, secretary of the CDF, wrote, "I would like to state now that this phrase [probata praxis Ecclesiae] must be understood in the context of traditional moral theology. These couples [Catholics living in irregular marital unions] may be allowed to receive the sacraments on two conditions, that they try to live according to the demands of Christian moral principles and that they receive the sacraments in churches in which they are not known so that they will not create any scandal".

In 1981, Pope John Paul II issued the apostolic exhortation Familiaris consortio, which states, "the Church reaffirms her practice, which is based upon Sacred Scripture, of not admitting to Eucharistic Communion divorced persons who have remarried". The exhortation continues, "Reconciliation in the sacrament of Penance which would open the way to the Eucharist, can only be granted to those who, repenting of having broken the sign of the Covenant and of fidelity to Christ, are sincerely ready to undertake a way of life that is no longer in contradiction to the indissolubility of marriage. This means, in practice, that when, for serious reasons, such as for example the children's upbringing, a man and a woman cannot satisfy the obligation to separate, they 'take on themselves the duty to live in complete continence, that is, by abstinence from the acts proper to married couples.'"

Two articles of the 1992 Catechism of the Catholic Church address the reception of the sacraments of Penance and Holy Communion by divorced persons who are civilly remarried. Article 1650 states, "they cannot receive Eucharistic Communion as long as this situation persists". Article 1650 continues, "Reconciliation through the sacrament of Penance can be granted only to those who have repented for having violated the sign of the covenant and of fidelity to Christ, and who are committed to living in complete continence". Article 2390 states that outside of marriage, the sexual act "constitutes a grave sin and excludes one from sacramental communion".

In 1993 German bishops Walter Kasper, Karl Lehmann, and Oskar Saier had a letter read in the churches of their dioceses saying this question of Communion for divorced Catholics "in complex, individual cases" needed to be addressed. These bishops are said to have supported Cardinal Bergoglio for the papacy in 2005. When Cardinal Ratzinger was elected the group disbanded, but when Bergoglio was elected in 2013 Kasper returned to prominence on this issue.

In 1994, the Congregation for the Doctrine of the Faith released a letter which states that divorced and civilly remarried persons cannot receive the sacraments of Penance and Holy Communion unless, where they cannot separate due to serious reasons, such as the upbringing of children, "they 'take on themselves the duty to live in complete continence, that is, by abstinence from the acts proper to married couples'". The letter also states that even if a divorced person is subjectively certain in conscience that their previous marriage had never been valid, this determination can only be made by a competent ecclesiastical tribunal.

In his encyclical Ecclesia de Eucharistia, Pope John Paul II states: "those who 'obstinately persist in manifest grave sin' are not to be admitted to Eucharistic communion".

In 2007, Pope Benedict XVI released the apostolic exhortation Sacramentum caritatis. Benedict XVI "confirmed the Church's practice, based on Sacred Scripture (cf. Mk 10:2- 12), of not admitting the divorced and remarried to the sacraments, since their state and their condition of life objectively contradict the loving union of Christ and the Church signified and made present in the Eucharist". With regard to divorced persons living in new unions, Benedict XVI states, "Finally, where the nullity of the marriage bond is not declared and objective circumstances make it impossible to cease cohabitation, the Church encourages these members of the faithful to commit themselves to living their relationship in fidelity to the demands of God's law, as friends, as brother and sister; in this way they will be able to return to the table of the Eucharist, taking care to observe the Church's established and approved practice in this regard".

=== 2014 and 2015 Synods on the Family ===
The 2014 and 2015 Synods on the Family addressed the Catholic Church's pastoral care of families. With regard to the access of divorced persons living in new unions to the sacraments of Reconciliation and the Eucharist, the relatio (final document) of the 2014 Synod states:

52. The synod fathers also considered the possibility of giving the divorced and remarried access to the Sacraments of Penance and the Eucharist. Various synod fathers insisted on maintaining the present discipline, because of the constitutive relationship between participation in the Eucharist and communion with the Church as well as her teaching on the indissoluble character of marriage. Others proposed a more individualized approach, permitting access in certain situations and with certain well-defined conditions, primarily in irreversible situations and those involving moral obligations towards children who would have to endure unjust suffering. Access to the sacraments might take place if preceded by a penitential practice, determined by the diocesan bishop. The subject needs to be thoroughly examined, bearing in mind the distinction between an objective sinful situation and extenuating circumstances, given that "imputability and responsibility for an action can be diminished or even nullified by ignorance, inadvertence, duress, fear, habit, inordinate attachments, and other psychological or social factors" (Catechism of the Catholic Church, 1735). 53. Some synod fathers maintained that divorced and remarried persons or those living together can have fruitful recourse to a spiritual communion. Others raised the question as to why, then, they cannot have access to sacramental Communion. As a result, the synod fathers requested that further theological study in the matter with a view to making clear the distinctive features of the two forms and their connection with the theology of marriage.

With regard to the pastoral care of divorced persons living in new unions, the relatio of the 2015 Synod states,

[85.] Moreover, one cannot deny that in some circumstances "imputability and responsibility for an action can be diminished or even nullified" (CCC, 1735) due to several constraints. Accordingly, the judgment of an objective situation should not lead to a judgment on "subjective imputability" (Pontifical Council for Legislative Texts, Declaration of 24 June 2000, 2a). Under certain circumstances people find it very difficult to act differently. Therefore, while supporting a general rule, it is necessary to recognize that responsibility with respect to certain actions or decisions is not the same in all cases. Pastoral discernment, while taking into account a person's properly formed conscience, must take responsibility for these situations. Even the consequences of actions taken are not necessarily the same in all cases. 86. The path of accompaniment and discernment guides the faithful to an awareness of their situation before God. Conversation with the priest, in the internal forum, contributes to the formation of a correct judgment on what hinders the possibility of a fuller participation in the life of Church and Church practice which can foster it and make it grow. Given that gradualness is not in the law itself (cf. FC 34), this discernment can never prescind from the Gospel demands of truth and charity as proposed by the Church. This occurs when the following conditions are present: humility, discretion and love for the Church and her teaching, in a sincere search for God's will and a desire to make a more perfect response to it.

Schönborn said that when the 2015 synod participants formed small discussion groups some of them began by sharing their own family histories and discovered that many of them had direct experience in their own families of marriages that fail to conform to the ideal, which he termed "patchwork families". He said his own experience – his parents divorced when he was about 14 years old – made him thankful that the text "goes beyond the artificial, superficial, clear division between 'regular' and 'irregular', placing everyone under the common lens of the Gospel, in accordance with the words of St. Paul: 'God has consigned all to disobedience, that He may have mercy on all.'"

=== Redaction ===
Archbishop Víctor Manuel Fernández took part in the redaction of the document.

== Content ==
The text of Amoris laetitia was released in Arabic, Chinese, English, French, German, Italian, Latin, Polish, Portuguese, Russian, and Spanish. The English text runs about 250 small-format pages with nearly 400 footnotes. Its introduction and 9 chapters comprise 325 numbered paragraphs. Quotations are drawn from the writings of earlier popes, documents of the Second Vatican Council and regional episcopal conferences, St. Thomas Aquinas, and Martin Luther King, Jr. It includes references to works by Jorge Luis Borges, Octavio Paz, Antonin Sertillanges, Gabriel Marcel, and Mario Benedetti.

Introduction

The introduction to Amoris laetitia begins with Pope Francis recalling the Synods' examination of the situation of families in today's world and calls for "a broader vision and a renewed awareness of the importance of marriage and the family". (paragraph 2) He says that the document addresses many issues in different ways and therefore says: "I do not recommend a rushed reading of the text". He asks the reader to consider the text "patiently and carefully". (paragraph 7)

1. In the Light of the Word

This chapter is "a biblical meditation on key themes related to the topic of marriage and family life" and includes a section on the importance of work.

2. The Experiences and Challenges of Families

Here the Pope considers the contemporary realities of family life, acknowledging the unique challenges faced at the present time, including phenomena like migration, lack of housing, inattention to persons with disabilities, lack of respect for the elderly, and "the ideological denial of differences between the sexes". He concludes that only by adopting a point of view of realism can we avoid an abstract and artificial notion of marriage which has little to do with the lived experiences of families in today's world.

3. Looking to Jesus, The Vocation of the Family

Chapter three deals with the vocation of the family according to the Catholic tradition and the Gospels. It stresses the sacramental nature of marriage, its indissolubility, and its role in the transmission of life. Pope Francis states that the family is an image of the Trinity, Christ's love for the Church, and "the espousal of our human nature by the Son of God". (paragraphs 71 and 73) This chapter touches on "imperfect situations" and "wounded families" and calls pastors "to exercise careful discernment of situations". (Familiaris consortio, 84)

4. Love in Marriage

Pope Francis examines each phrase of St. Paul's passage on love in 1 Corinthians 13:4–13:7 in detail. The progressive "transformation of love" that takes place throughout the marriage is a point of focus, stressing that the ideal represented by the union cannot happen at once, and it is observed that longer lifespans necessitate a renewal of commitment.

5. Love Made Fruitful

In this chapter the focus shifts entirely to the procreative aspect of marriage. Pope Francis discusses the spiritual and psychological issues that come into play when welcoming new life into the world, and touches on subjects such as adoption and the role of the extended family. It is notable that Amoris laetitia does not speak only of the "nuclear family," insisting that the family must be understood as operating within a much wider network of relationships. (paragraph 187)

6. Some Pastoral Perspectives

Chapter six is aimed at ministers who will have to accompany couples in the early years of marriage, when in contemporary culture risk of crisis is at its highest. This discussion transitions into the need to minister to abandoned, separated, or divorced persons, stressing the importance of the recently reformed annulment process. The Pope also speaks to families with members who have homosexual tendencies. The section concludes with a discussion of death and widowhood.

7. Towards a Better Education of Children

As suggested by the title, chapter 7 speaks to pedagogy. The Pope encourages ethical formation, discipline, prudent punishment, realism, and sex education, warning against the tendencies to want to control every experience of children which results in a desire to dominate. Instead, Pope Francis asks parents to lovingly help children grow in freedom in order to achieve real autonomy through development and discipline.

8. Accompanying, Discerning and Integrating Weakness

Chapter 8 focuses on the pastoral care of church members who have been divorced and entered into new unions, or are affected by these "irregular unions" in some way. Rather than "provide a new set of canonical rules, canonical in nature and applicable to all cases," Chapter 8 encourages "a responsible personal and pastoral discernment of particular cases, one which would recognize that, since 'the degree of responsibility is not equal in all cases', the consequences or effects of a rule need not necessarily always be the same". (paragraph 300) Pope Francis continues, "The Church possesses a solid body of reflection concerning mitigating factors and situations. Hence it can no longer simply be said that all those in any 'irregular' situation are living in a state of mortal sin and are deprived of sanctifying grace. More is involved here than mere ignorance of the rule. A subject may know full well the rule, yet have great difficulty in understanding 'its inherent values', or be in a concrete situation which does not allow him or her to act differently and decide otherwise without further sin". (paragraph 301)

Following an exhortation to help guide the conscience of persons living in irregular situations (paragraph 303), Pope Francis observes, "Because of forms of conditioning and mitigating factors, it is possible that in an objective situation of sin – which may not be subjectively culpable, or fully such – a person can be living in God's grace, can love and can also grow in the life of grace and charity, while receiving the Church's help to this end". (paragraph 305) In a footnote, Pope Francis states, "In certain cases, this can include the help of the sacraments. Hence, 'I want to remind priests that the confessional must not be a torture chamber, but rather an encounter with the Lord's mercy' (Evangelii gaudium, 44). I would also point out that the Eucharist 'is not a prize for the perfect, but a powerful medicine and nourishment for the weak'" (Footnote 351).

Pope Francis then reminds his audience, "In order to avoid all misunderstanding, I would point out that in no way must the Church desist from proposing the full ideal of marriage, God's plan in all its grandeur: 'Young people who are baptized should be encouraged to understand that the sacrament of marriage can enrich their prospects of love and that they can be sustained by the grace of Christ in the sacrament and by the possibility of participating fully in the life of the Church'". (paragraph 307)

9. The Spirituality of Marriage and the Family

The closing chapter is devoted to marital and family spirituality. Persons called to family life are reassured that this context does not detract from their spiritual growth or potential, and says that this vocation should be seen as their own path to mystical union. He closes by emphasizing the necessity of mercy within the family, explaining that all are called to grow, develop, and mature, helping one another in spite of weaknesses and limitations.

== Sacraments for Catholics in "irregular" situations ==
Controversy arose following the publication of Amoris laetitia regarding whether Chapter 8 of the exhortation had changed the Catholic Church's sacramental discipline concerning access to the sacraments of Reconciliation and the Eucharist for divorced couples who have civilly remarried.

The Apostolic exhortation has in the chapter VIII the following sentence: "Because of forms of conditioning and mitigating factors, it is possible that in an objective situation of sin – which may not be subjectively culpable, or fully such – a person can be living in God's grace, can love and can also grow in the life of grace and charity, while receiving the Church's help to this end". The footnote 351 of this sentence states: "In certain cases, this can include the help of the sacraments. Hence, 'I want to remind priests that the confessional must not be a torture chamber, but rather an encounter with the Lord's mercy' (Apostolic Exhortation Evangelii Gaudium [24 November 2013], 44: AAS 105 [2013], 1038). I would also point out that the Eucharist 'is not a prize for the perfect, but a powerful medicine and nourishment for the weak' (ibid., 47: 1039)".

This footnote 351 created confusion and still created confusion as of 2018.

=== Schönborn's commentary at the official press conference ===
The day Amoris laetitia was released, 8 April 2016, a press conference sponsored by the Vatican Press Office to present Amoris laetitia took place. During this press conference, Cardinal Christoph Schönborn (Archbishop of Vienna), Cardinal Lorenzo Baldisseri (Secretary General of the Synod of Bishops), Franco Miano, and Giuseppina De Simone, discussed the document.

Cardinal Schönborn made a presentation of Amoris laetitia in which, regarding the possibility of access to the sacraments of Reconciliation and of the eucharist for Catholics living in "irregular" situations, he stated:

Naturally this poses the question: what does the Pope say in relation to access to the sacraments for people who live in 'irregular' situations? Pope Francis reiterates the need to discern carefully the situation in keeping with St. John Paul II's Familiaris consortio. 'Discernment must help to find possible ways of responding to God and growing in the midst of limits. By thinking that everything is black and white, we sometimes close off the way of grace and of growth, and discourage paths of sanctification which give glory to God', ... in the sense of this 'via caritatis', the Pope affirms, in a humble and simple manner, in a note that the help of the sacraments may also be given in 'certain cases'. But for this purpose he does not offer us case studies or recipes, but instead simply reminds us of two of his famous phrases: 'I want to remind priests that the confessional should not be a torture chamber but rather an encounter with the Lord’s mercy' and the Eucharist 'is not a prize for the perfect but a powerful medicine and nourishment for the weak'. Is it an excessive challenge for pastors, for spiritual guides and for communities if the 'discernment of situations is not regulated more precisely? Pope Francis acknowledges this concern: 'I understand those who prefer a more rigorous pastoral care which leaves no room for confusion.' However, he challenges this, remarking that 'we put so many conditions on mercy that we empty it of its concrete meaning and real significance. That is the worst way of watering down the Gospel'.

In April 2016, after the release of Amoris laetitia, a journalist asked Pope Francis: "For a Catholic who wants to know: are there new, concrete possibilities that didn't exist before the publication of the exhortation or not?" Pope Francis replied: "I can say yes, period. But it would be an answer that is too small. I recommend that you read the presentation of Cardinal Schönborn, who is a great theologian. He was the secretary for the Congregation of the Doctrine of the Faith, and he knows the doctrine of the faith well. In that presentation, your question will find an answer".

=== Letter of the bishops of Buenos Aires ===
In the beginning September 2016, the bishops of Buenos Aires sent their priests a document on the interpretation an application of the 8th chapter of Amoris laetitia; this interpretation was to integrate remarried divorcees with admission to the sacraments on a case-by-case basis. The same month, the pope sent the bishops of Buenos Aires a letter concerning their document; in his letter, Francis stated that the "text is very good and fully captures the meaning of chapter VIII of the 'Amoris Laetitia'. There are no other interpretations. I am sure it will do much good. May the Lord reward you for this effort of pastoral charity". In the AAS of October 2016, the document of the bishops of Buenos Aires was published along with the previous answer of the pope; below the two documents was a papal rescriptum dated 5 June 2017, signed by the Sectetary of State Pietro Parolin; this rescriptum stated: "The Supreme Pontiff decrees that the two preceding Documents be published on the Vatican website and the Acta Apostolicae Sedis as Authentic Magisterium. Written at the Vatican Palace on June 5, 2017, Card. Pietro Parolin, Secretary of State". Cardinal Francesco Coccopalmerio, president of the Pontifical Council for Legislative Texts, said: "The fact that the Pope requested that his letter and the interpretations of the Buenos Aires bishops be published in the AAS means that His Holiness has given these documents a particular qualification that elevates them to the level of being official teachings of the church. While the content of the Pope's letter itself does not contain teachings on faith and morals, it does point toward the interpretations of the Argentine bishops and confirms them as authentically reflecting his own mind. Thus together the two documents became the Holy Father's authentic magisterium for the whole church".

=== Answer to cardinal Duka's dubia ===
On 2 October 2023, the Holy See released the Dicastery for the Doctrine of the Faith's answers to 10 dubia Czech cardinal Duka had sent on behalf of the Czech Bishops' Conference concerning "the administration of the Eucharist to divorced couples living in a new union" regarding Amoris laetitia. The document of the Dicastery states, among other things, that Amoris laetitia is "a document of the ordinary pontifical magisterium, toward which all are called to offer the obsequiousness of intelligence and will", that the 2016 letter of the bishops of Buenos Aires is "authentic magisterium" and that "the issue is sufficiently explained in the [2016 letter of the bishops of Buenos Aires]".

=== Implementation ===
Bishops in different regions of the world have each implemented their own guidelines concerning the pastoral care of persons living in "irregular" situations in accordance with chapter 8 of Amoris laetitia.

==== Portsmouth (April 2016) ====
Bishop Philip Egan of Portsmouth, England, published a letter in the same month that Amoris laetitia was released in which he observed: "What to me is new in Amoris Laetitia is the Pope's application of the traditional distinction between mortal and venial sin to the many messy situations people find themselves in with regards to love, sexuality and relationships. For a mortal sin to be committed, three conditions are necessary: grave matter, full knowledge and full consent of the will (cf. Catechism 1857).... Some people are in messy situations through no real fault of their own, but through the actions of another. Bearing all this in mind can help pastors and individuals find creative ways forward". Bishop Egan added: "Does the Pope say the divorced and civilly remarried may now be readmitted to Holy Communion? No. What he says is that instead they need a good priest to reach out to them, to accompany them, to help them discern their situation before the Lord and to enable them to develop, to change and to take their proper place in the Church's life and mission".

==== Buenos Aires (September 2016) ====
The bishops of Buenos Aires issued guidelines for priests concerning the implementation of Amoris laetitia in September 2016. The Buenos Aires guidelines state, "When the concrete circumstances of a couple make it feasible, especially when both are Christians with a path of faith, the commitment to live in continence can be proposed". The guidelines continue, "In other more complex circumstances, and when a declaration of nullity could not be obtained, the aforementioned option may not be in fact feasible. However, a path of discernment is also possible. If it is recognized that, in a specific case, there are limitations that mitigate liability and guilt (see 301 – 302), particularly when a person considers that he would fall on a further fault damaging the children of the new union, Amoris laetitia opens the possibility of access to the sacraments of Reconciliation and the Eucharist (see notes 336 and 351)".

Pope Francis approved the Buenos Aires guidelines in a letter dated 5 September 2016, stating, "The writing is very good and explicitly the meaning of chapter VIII of Amoris laetitia. There are no other interpretations. May the Lord reward you for this effort of pastoral charity".

In December 2017, both the Buenos Aires guidelines and Pope Francis' letter of approval were published in the October 2016 edition of the Acta Apostolicae Sedis, followed by a statement by Vatican Secretary of State Cardinal Pietro Parolin that Pope Francis had decreed that both documents be promulgated as authentic magisterium.

==== Malta (January 2017) ====
Similarly to the bishops of Buenos Aires, the bishops of Malta issued guidelines in January 2017 which state, "Despite the fact that this ideal is not at all easy, there may be couples who, with the help of grace, practice this virtue [continence] without putting at risk other aspects of their life together. On the other hand, there are complex situations where the choice of living "as brothers and sisters" becomes humanly impossible and gives rise to greater harm (see AL, note 329)". The guidelines continue, "If, as a result of the process of discernment, undertaken with 'humility, discretion and love for the Church and her teaching, in a sincere search for God's will and a desire to make a more perfect response to it' (AL 300), a separated or divorced person who is living in a new relationship manages, with an informed and enlightened conscience, to acknowledge and believe that he or she is at peace with God, he or she cannot be precluded from participating in the sacraments of Reconciliation and the Eucharist (see AL, notes 336 and 351)".

==== Ordinariate of the Chair of St Peter (January 2017) ====
Bishop Steven J. Lopes, head of the Personal Ordinariate of the Chair of Saint Peter, issued guidelines in January 2017 which state, "A civilly remarried couple, if committed to complete continence, could have the Eucharist available to them, after proper discernment with their pastor and making recourse to the sacrament of reconciliation. Such a couple may experience continence as difficult, and they may sometimes fail, in which case they are, like any Christian, to repent, confess their sins, and begin anew".

==== Germany (February 2017) ====
In February 2017, the German Bishops' Conference issued a pastoral letter that concludes that after a decision-making process is carried out with the accompaniment of one's pastor, "in which the consciences of all parties must be highly engaged", a divorced and remarried Catholic can receive the sacraments of Reconciliation and the Eucharist.

==== Belgium (May 2017) ====
The bishops of Belgium released guidelines in May 2017 that state, "A process of discernment does not lead to a yes or no automatic power to commune. It can happen that someone decides not to receive the Eucharist. We have the greatest respect for such a decision. It is also possible that someone decides in conscience to receive the Eucharist. This decision also deserves respect. Between laxity and rigorism, Pope Francis chooses the path of personal discernment and a decision taken carefully and conscientiously".

==== Brazil (August 2017) ====
The National Conference of Bishops of Brazil published guidelines in August 2017 which state, "There are limited cases where the existence of excuses for non-interruption of conjugal coexistence, for example, the existence of children and certain moral circumstances, may attenuate or even annul the moral responsibility and imputability of unlawful acts". The guidelines continue, "The practice of sexual continence for couples in a second union is not excluded. In this case, the confessor may be merciful with eventual falls".

==== Ghana (November 2017) ====
The bishops of Ghana released a communique in November 2017 that states, "In considering a pastoral approach towards people who have contracted a civil marriage, who are divorced and remarried, or simply living together, the Church has the responsibility of helping them understand the divine teaching of grace in their lives and offering them assistance so they can reach the fullness of God's plan for them, something which is always possible by the power of the Holy Spirit". The communique continues, "Discernment must help to find possible ways of responding to God and growing in the midst of limits. By thinking that everything is black and white, we sometimes close off the way of grace and of growth, and discourage paths of sanctification which give glory to God. Let us remember that 'a small step, in the midst of great human limitations, can be more pleasing to God than a life which appears outwardly in order, but moves through the day without confronting great difficulties'. The practical pastoral care of ministers and of communities must not fail to embrace this reality. (cf. AL, 305)"

==== Poland (June 2018) ====
In June 2018, the bishops of Poland published guidelines for implementing Chapter 8 of Amoris laetitia. The guidelines do not address the issue of Holy Communion for people living in non-sacramental relationships.

==== Dioceses in North America ====
Philadelphia (July 2016)

Archbishop Charles J. Chaput of Philadelphia published guidelines in July 2016 that state, "Undertaking to live as brother and sister is necessary for the divorced and civilly-remarried to receive reconciliation in the Sacrament of Penance, which could then open the way to the Eucharist. Such individuals are encouraged to approach the Sacrament of Penance regularly, having recourse to God's great mercy in that sacrament if they fail in chastity".

Alberta and the Northwest Territories (September 2016)

The bishops of Alberta and the Northwest Territories released guidelines in September 2016 that state with regard to divorced and civilly remarried Catholics, "If, for example, they are unable to separate for the sake of the care of children, they will need to refrain from sexual intimacy and live in chastity "as brother and sister" (cf. Familiaris Consortio, 84). Such a firm resolution to live in accordance with the teaching of Christ, relying always on the help of his grace, opens to them the possibility of celebrating the sacrament of Penance, which in turn may lead to the reception of Holy Communion at Mass".

San Diego (October 2016)

In a pastoral letter published in October 2016, Bishop Robert W. McElroy of San Diego writes that there is "a role for the discernment of conscience on the question of participation in the life of the Church and the reception of the Eucharist". McElroy writes, "Some Catholics engaging in this process of discernment will conclude that God is calling them to return to full participation in the life of the Church and the Eucharist. Others will conclude that they should wait, or that their return would hurt others". He concludes, "Rules have an essential role in the life of the believer in conveying the wisdom and grace of the Church and providing a firm check on rationalization. But it is in the act of conscience, well-formed and profoundly considered, that the believer is most Christlike in carrying out his moral mission in the world".

Portland (May 2017)

Archbishop Alexander King Sample of Portland, Oregon, released guidelines in May 2017 that repeat the guidelines issued by the Archdiocese of Philadelphia in July 2016: "Undertaking to live as brother and sister is necessary for the divorced and civilly-remarried to receive reconciliation in the Sacrament of Penance, which could then open the way to reception of the Holy Eucharist. Such individuals are encouraged to approach the Sacrament of Penance regularly, having recourse to God's great mercy in that sacrament if they fail in chastity".

==== Dioceses in Italy ====
Rome (October 2016)

In October 2016, the Cardinal Vicar of the Diocese of Rome issued guidelines that state, "But when the concrete circumstances of a couple make it feasible, that is, when their faith journey has been long, sincere and progressive, it can be proposed they live in continence; if this choice is difficult to practice for the stability of the couple, Amoris Laetitia does not exclude the possibility of access to Penance and the Eucharist". The guidelines continue, "Who can decide? From the tenor of the text and mind of its Author, I do not think that there is any other solution than that of the internal forum. In fact the internal forum is a conducive way to open our hearts to the most intimate confidences, and if a relationship of trust with a confessor or a spiritual guide has been established over time, you can start and develop with him a long journey of conversion: patient, with small steps and progressive inspections. Therefore, there can be no one other than the confessor, at a certain point, in his consciousness, after much reflection and prayer, to assume responsibility before God and the penitent and to request that access to the sacraments takes place in a confidential manner. In these cases the journey of discernment (AL, 303: "Dynamic discernment" ) in order to reach new milestones towards the full Christian ideal does not end".

Sicily (June 2017)

The Sicilian Bishops' Conference released guidelines in June 2017 that state, "In some circumstances, therefore, concerning the divorced and remarried according to the evaluation of the confessor and taking into account the good of the penitent, it is possible to absolve and admit to the Eucharist, even if the confessor knows that it is for the Church an objective disorder. However, it must be clear that if one flaunts an objective sin as if it were part of the Christian ideal, or wants to impose something different from what the Church teaches, ... they need to hear again the proclamation of the Gospel and the invitation to conversion (AL 297)". The guidelines continue, "The requirement to access the sacraments is repentance and the commitment to go through a new path, human and spiritual, in the current objective situation in which the person finds themselves, and not abstract perfection. There are circumstances, in fact, in which every norm must be traced back to its own end which is the salvation of souls, the good of people".

Piedmont (January 2018)

In January 2018, the Episcopal Conference of Piedmont and Valle D'Aosta issued guidelines that cite Pope Francis' approval of the Buenos Aires guidelines and propose a path of case-by-case integration where it is not "practicable" for a divorced person in a new civil union to abstain from the acts proper to married couples.

==== Dioceses in Portugal ====
Braga (January 2018)

In January 2018, the Archdiocese of Braga, Portugal, released guidelines for a process of discernment for divorced and civilly remarried couples who are unable to obtain a declaration of nullity with respect to a prior marriage. Jorge Ortiga, Primate Archbishop of Braga, explained, "After several steps and a course of a few months, it will ultimately be up to the couple to take the decision before God". While noting that "It is not a matter of granting a general 'authorization' to access the sacraments, but a process of personal discernment", Archbishop Ortiga said the process of discernment "is likely to culminate in access to the sacraments (reconciliation and communion), but may also be directed towards other forms of greater integration in Church's life".

Lisbon (February 2018)

In February 2018, Cardinal Patriarch Manuel Clemente of Lisbon issued guidelines under Chapter 8 of Amoris Laetitia which state the following:

Bearing all this in mind, I present herein some operative guidelines: a) To accompany and integrate people into the life of the community, in line with the post-synodal Apostolic Exhortations Familiaris Consortio, 84, Sacramentum Caritatis, 29 and Amoris Laetitia, 299. b) Carefully examine the specificity of each case. c) Not to exclude recourse to the diocesan tribunal, whenever there is doubt concerning the validity of the matrimony. d) In cases in which validity is ascertained, not to neglect the proposal of a life in continence in the new situation. e) To bear in mind exceptional circumstances and the possibility of the sacraments, in line with the aforementioned apostolic exhortation and documents. f) To continue the process of discernment, bringing the practice ever closer to the ideal of Christian matrimony and sacramental consistency.

On 26 June 2018, Pope Francis wrote a letter to Cardinal Clemente thanking him for these guidelines.

== Requests for clarifications ==
=== 2016 ===
==== Early reactions ====
On 29 June 2016, forty-five Catholics presented a letter to the Dean of the College of Cardinals, Cardinal Angelo Sodano, in which they claimed to find 12 heretical propositions and 8 propositions falling under lesser theological censures.

Also in June 2016, Carlos José Errázuriz Mackenna, professor of canon law at Pontifical University of the Holy Cross, wrote that Amoris laetitia invited the Catholic Church to deepen its understanding of the demands of justice in the context of the marital bond, understanding them as positive affirmations rather than merely negative limits.

In August 2016, Father Salvador Pie-Ninot, a professor of ecclesiology, wrote that Amoris laetitia is an example of the "ordinary magisterium," papal teaching to which Catholics are obliged to give "religious submission of will and intellect".

Some traditionalists, notably Kazhakstani Bishop Athanasius Schneider and the group Voice of the Family, have criticized Francis' exhortation. Voice of the Family has called on him to "recognise the grave errors in the recently published Apostolic Exhortation, Amoris Laetitia, in particular those sections which will lead to the desecration of the Holy Eucharist and to the harming of our children, and to withdraw the Apostolic Exhortation with immediate effect."

==== Dubia ====
In September 2016, four cardinals (Raymond Burke, Carlo Caffarra, Walter Brandmüller, Joachim Meisner) asked Pope Francis in a private letter for clarifications regarding Chapter 8 of Amoris laetitia. The letter contained five questions (dubia), and requested a yes or no answer. The cardinals publicized their letter in November 2016 after not receiving a response from Pope Francis. Their questions focus on "whether there are now circumstances under which divorced and remarried persons can receive communion, whether there are still 'absolute moral norms' that prohibit Catholics from taking certain acts, and how the pope understands Catholic teaching on the role of conscience in making moral decisions".

Some Catholic scholars, including German philosopher Robert Spaemann and British academic Joseph Shaw, have expressed support for their initiative. Cardinal George Pell, Prefect of the Vatican Secretariat for the Economy, asked: "How can you disagree with a question?" In December 2016, the head of the Congregation for the Doctrine of the Faith, Cardinal Gerhard Müller, while declaring that it was not the role of the Congregation to engage in the controversy, indicated that he does not believe that the doctrine on communion can change.

Oxford philosopher John Finnis and theologian Germain Grisez also expressed their concern in a detailed letter, requesting the pope to condemn eight positions against the Catholic faith "that are being supported, or likely will be, by the misuse" of Amoris laetitia.

However, according to close Pope Francis adviser, Antonio Spadaro, the controversial questions on communion were already answered. Archbishop of Brisbane Mark Coleridge said that prelates supporting the dubia are pursuing a "false clarity that comes because you don't address reality". In line with this view, it has been suggested that Pope Francis declined to answer the dubia because he wants to emphasize a more humane, pastoral approach and de-emphasize the demand for legal clarity.

Cardinal Caffarra said that after Amoris laetitia "only a blind man could deny there's great confusion, uncertainty and insecurity in the Church".

=== 2017 ===
In January 2017, three Kazakhstan bishops issued a joint statement imploring prayer that Pope Francis will "confirm the unchanging praxis of the Church with regard to the truth of the indissolubility of marriage". They affirmed that some of the recent "pastoral guidelines contradict the universal tradition of the Catholic Church".

In February 2017, several confraternities of priests, in the United States, the United Kingdom, Ireland and Australia, asked for a formal clarification of Chapter 8 of Amoris laetitia.

On 14 February 2017, Cardinal Francesco Coccopalmerio, head of the Pontifical Council for Legislative Texts, which interprets Church law, authored a 50-page booklet stating that Chapter 8 of Amoris laetitia allows access to the sacraments for the divorced and civilly remarried only if they recognize that their situation is sinful and desire to change it. He wrote that the intention to change, even if the couple cannot do so immediately, "is exactly the theological element that allows absolution and access to the Eucharist as long as – I repeat – there is the impossibility of immediately changing the situation of sin".

In a private letter hand-delivered on 6 May 2017 to Pope Francis, Carlo Caffarra, on behalf of the four cardinals, asked for a papal audience. Caffarra stated that "interpretations of some objectively ambiguous passages" of Amoris laetitia have been given that are "not divergent from, but contrary to, the permanent Magisterium of the Church". In June, having not yet received a response from Pope Francis, the cardinals made the letter public.

In an interview in June 2017, Cardinal Schönborn challenged the notion that Amoris laetitia might weaken respect for the sacrament of marriage, stating, "I think discernment, in the sense of Amoris Laetitia, would in some areas of the Church, lead into a stricter attitude. In the West, generally, we are rather tempted by laxity. In some areas, some people are tempted by rigorism. And Pope Francis said something very important: Neither the rigorists nor the laxists do the work of discernment. The rigorist knows everything in advance and those who are lax let go of everything".

Cardinal Meisner died on 5 July 2017, and Cardinal Caffarra died on 6 September 2017.

In September 2017, Pope Francis told a gathering of Jesuits in Colombia, "I hear many comments – they are respectable for they come from children of God, but wrong concerning the post-synod apostolic exhortation. To understand Amoris Laetitia you need to read it from the start to the end. Beginning with the first chapter, and to continue to the second and then on … and reflect. And read what was said in the Synod". He continued, "A second thing: some maintain that there is no Catholic morality underlying Amoris Laetitia, or at least, no sure morality. I want to repeat clearly that the morality of Amoris Laetitia is Thomist, the morality of the great Thomas. You can speak of it with a great theologian, one of the best today and one of the most mature, Cardinal Schönborn".

One year after the publication of the dubia, Cardinal Burke made a "final plea" to Pope Francis, mentioning the "continually worsening" gravity of the situation in the Church in the wake of the exhortation.

Commenting in November 2017 on critics of Amoris laetitia, Italian philosopher Rocco Buttiglione wrote that among them "a new deviation emerges" which Buttiglione called "ethical objectivism".

==== Filial correction ====
In July 2017, a group of 40 (now over 260) Catholic clergy, lay scholars, and theologians signed and presented to Pope Francis a 25-page document entitled Correctio filialis de haeresibus propagatis (A Filial Correction Concerning the Propagation of Heresies). The document states that certain passages from Amoris laetitia and other "words, deeds, and omissions" of Pope Francis "are serving to propagate heresies". The document had 62 signatories when it was made public in September after the group received no reply. The most prominent signatories were Bishop Bernard Fellay, the superior general of the Society of Saint Pius X, which has been at odds with the Holy See for decades; Ettore Gotti Tedeschi, former president of the Vatican bank; and Joseph Shaw, tutorial fellow in philosophy at Oxford University. Dr. Jacob Wood, assistant professor of theology at Franciscan University of Steubenville, said that Amoris laetitia does not explicitly state any of the heresies alleged by the signatories. Rather, "The signatories claim that the pope has failed to stop the spread of heresy, rather than that he has committed the sin of heresy himself". Cardinal Pietro Parolin, Vatican Secretary of State, indirectly addressed the controversy, advocating for those who disagree with the Pope to dialogue with the church and "find ways to understand one another".

==== Petition about Sacramental Marriage ====
On 31 December 2017, three bishops of Kazakhstan, including Bishop Athanasius Schneider, issued a "Profession of Immutable Truths about Sacramental Marriage". The Profession states that some pastoral guidelines issued by bishops that allow the divorced and civilly remarried to receive the sacraments of Penance and Holy Communion have caused confusion among the Catholic faithful and clergy. The Profession states: "An approval or legitimation of the violation of the sacredness of the marriage bond, even indirectly through the mentioned new sacramental discipline, seriously contradicts God's express will and His commandment". One month after its release, seven other bishops, including Cardinal Janis Pujats and Archbishops Carlo Maria Viganò and Luigi Negri, had added their names to the Profession.

=== 2018 ===
Early in 2018, Father Kevin J. Flannery, professor at Pontifical Gregorian University, and Father V. Thomas Berg, professor at Saint Joseph's Seminary, published an article in Nova et Vetera that challenges Amoris laetitia's reliance on the writings of Thomas Aquinas.

In January 2018, Cardinal Pietro Parolin, Vatican Secretary of State, said that Amoris laetitia "resulted from a new paradigm which Pope Francis is carrying forward with wisdom, prudence, and patience," and that difficulties surrounding the document "besides some aspects of content, are due to this change of attitude the Pope is asking of us". In February 2018, Cardinal Blase Cupich of Chicago stated that Amoris laetitia "represents a major shift in our ministerial approach that is nothing short of revolutionary". Referring to critics of Amoris laetitia, Cupich said, "Instead of actually attending to the present reality of people's lives today in all its complexity, they limit their scope to an idealistic understanding of marriage and family".

In reply, Cardinal Müller wrote in February 2018 that, when understood in the sense of a "fundamental change in theoretical forms of thought and social behavior," there can be no paradigm shifts in the Catholic faith. Müller wrote that "a paradigm shift, by which the Church takes on the criteria of modern society to be assimilated by it, constitutes not a development, but a corruption". Müller also wrote that Familiaris Consortio established the discipline "that the divorced living in a new union must resolve to live in continence or else refrain from approaching the sacraments," and that any claim that Familiaris Consortio anticipated a change in this discipline "would have to violate the basic rules of logic".

In May 2018, Archbishop Vincenzo Paglia, President of the Pontifical Academy for Life, compared the controversy surrounding Amoris laetitia to that generated by Humanae vitae in the 1960s. Paglia stated that the care for injured family relationships found in Amoris laetitia is rooted in the teaching of Humane vitae on the "inseparable connection" between nuptial sexuality and responsible generation. Paglia wrote that, without wanting to furnish a new general norm, Pope Francis invited the whole Church to make further personal and pastoral discernment, which foresees, within a path of pastoral accompaniment and in specific cases, the possibility that a divorced and remarried couple access the sacraments, while maintaining a conjugal life to all intents and purposes. Paglia wrote that Pope Francis' primary concern is the pastoral care of the family and that he does not deny or even diminish the commandment of conjugal fidelity because the work of personal and pastoral discernment may come to recognize that in an objective situation of sin a person may not be subjectively guilty.

In August 2018, Pope Francis wrote to English author Stephen Walford, giving the following explanation for Amoris laetitia:

The Exhortation Amoris Laetitia is a unified whole which means that, in order to understand its message, it must be read in its entirety and from the beginning. This is because there is a development both of theological reflection and of the way in which problems are approached. It cannot be considered a vademecum on different issues. If the Exhortation is not read in its entirety and in the order it is written, it will either not be understood or it will be distorted. Over the course of the Exhortation, current and concrete problems are dealt with: the family in today’s world, the education of children, marriage preparation, families in difficulty, and so on; these are treated with a hermeneutic that comes from the whole document which is the magisterial hermeneutic of the Church, always in continuity (without ruptures), yet always maturing. In this regard, in your letter you mentioned Saint Vincent of Lérins in his Commonitorium Primum: "ut annis scilicet consolidetur, dilatetur tempore, sublimetur aetate" (Note: Which is translated as, "and [the Christian dogma] is solidified over the years, extended with time, and refined with age"). With respect to the problems that involve ethical situations, the Exhortation follows the classical doctrine of St. Thomas Aquinas.

The same month, Cardinal Scola publicly expressed for the first time his opposition to the communion of the divorced and civilly remarried unless they live in complete continence. According to Scola, the removal of this prohibition would be a break with the doctrine, because it is "not a punishment that can be taken away or reduced, but is inherent in the very character of Christian marriage "

== See also ==
- Pauline privilege
- Petrine privilege
- Matrimonial nullity trial reforms of Pope Francis
