= Athanasius Schneider =

Kazakhstani Catholic bishop

The Most Reverend Athanasius Schneider O.R.C.
- Auxiliary Bishop of Mary Most Holy in Astana
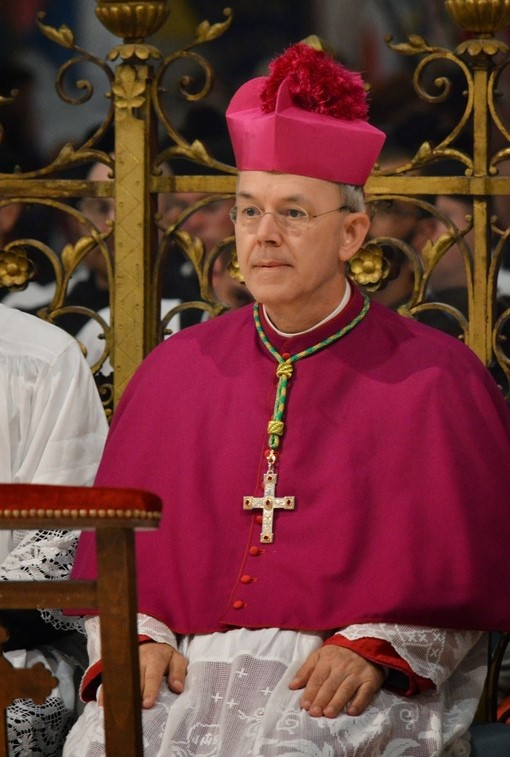
- Schneider in Chartres, France (2015)
- Archdiocese: Mary Most Holy in Astana
- Appointed: 5 February 2011
- Other post: Titular Bishop of Celerina (2006 - )
- Previous post: Auxiliary Bishop of Karaganda (2006–2011)

Orders
- Ordination: 25 March 1990 by Manuel Pestana Filho
- Consecration: 2 June 2006 by Angelo Sodano

Personal details
- Born: Anton Schneider; 7 April 1961 (age 65) Tokmok, Kirghiz SSR, Soviet Union (present day Kyrgyzstan)
- Denomination: Catholic Church
- Motto: Kyrie eleison (Lord, have mercy)
- Coat of arms

Styles of Athanasius Schneider
- Reference style: The Most Reverend
- Spoken style: Your Excellency
- Religious style: Bishop

Athanasius Schneider, O.R.C. (born Anton Schneider on 7 April 1961) is a Catholic prelate, serving as the Auxiliary Bishop of Astana in Kazakhstan. He is a member of the Canons Regular of the Holy Cross of Coimbra. He is known for championing the pre-Vatican II liturgical traditions and practices of the Catholic Church, such as the Tridentine Mass, and for protesting certain current policies including some associated with Pope Francis.

== Family and early life ==
Anton Schneider was born in Tokmok, Kirghiz Soviet Socialist Republic, in the Soviet Union. His parents were Black Sea Germans (ethnic German settlers who lived along the northern coast of the Black Sea in the Russian Empire), who at the end of World War II were evacuated to Berlin, then deported to a labor camp in Krasnokamsk in the Ural Mountains. His family was closely involved with the underground church. Schneider's mother Maria was one of several women to shelter the Blessed Oleksiy Zaryckyy, a Ukrainian priest later imprisoned at the infamous Karlag and in 1963 martyred by the Soviet regime for his ministry. The family relocated to the Kirghiz Soviet Socialist Republic after being released from the camps, then left Central Asia for Estonia. As a boy, Schneider and his three siblings would attend clandestine Masses with their parents, often traveling sixty miles from the family's home in Valga to Tartu, taking the first train in the morning under the cover of darkness and returning with the last train at night. Due to the great distance, infrequent visits by the clergy, and crackdowns by the Soviet authorities, they were able to make the trip only once a month. In 1973, shortly after making his First Holy Communion in secret, Schneider emigrated with his family to Rottweil in West Germany.

== Training and priesthood ==
In 1982 in Austria, Schneider joined the Canons Regular of the Holy Cross of Coimbra, a Roman Catholic religious order within the Opus Sanctorum Angelorum, and took the religious name "Athanasius". He was ordained a priest by Bishop Manuel Pestana Filho, Bishop of Anápolis, on 25 March 1990, and spent several years as a priest in Brazil before returning to Central Asia. Starting in 1999, he taught patristics at Mary, Mother of the Church Seminary in Karaganda. On 2 June 2006, he was consecrated a bishop at the altar of the Chair of Saint Peter in the Vatican by Cardinal Angelo Sodano. Schneider then served as an auxiliary bishop in the Diocese of Karaganda in Kazakhstan. In 2011, he was transferred to the position of auxiliary bishop in the Archdiocese of Astana. He is the General Secretary of the Bishops' Conference of Kazakhstan.

Schneider speaks German, Russian, Portuguese, Spanish, English, French and Italian. He also can read Latin and Ancient Greek.

== Views ==
Schneider is known for his traditionalism. He has criticized clergy members who he believes do not fully adhere to the faith and instead surrender to what he calls a "cruel pagan world". In 2014, he compared them to "members of the clergy and even bishops who put grains of incense in front of the statue of the emperor or of a pagan idol or who delivered the books of the Holy Scripture to be burned". He alleged that the present Catholic Church is beset by "traitors of the Faith".

Schneider has frequently traveled to conferences hosted by conservative and traditional Catholics. In 2018, he was warned by the Holy See to limit his travel outside his diocese, as canon law only allows a bishop to be absent for no more than a month unless on official duty. This led to him increasingly appearing at conferences via video. Schneider's views have made him generally well liked by Traditional Catholics who favor use of the Tridentine Mass.

=== Holy Communion ===
Schneider supports the liturgical tradition of receiving Holy Communion on the tongue while kneeling, which he explains as a sign of love for the body and blood of Jesus. This is the theme of his 2008 book Dominus Est, published in Italian, and since translated into English, German, Estonian, Lithuanian, Polish, Hungarian and Chinese. The book contains a foreword written by Malcolm Ranjith, then the Secretary of the Congregation for Divine Worship, currently Archbishop of Colombo and Metropolitan head of the church in Sri Lanka. In the book, Schneider writes that receiving Holy Communion in this way had become standard practice in the church by the 5th century and that Pope Gregory I strongly chastised priests who refused to follow this tradition. He wrote in 2009: "The awareness of the greatness of the eucharistic mystery is demonstrated in a special way by the manner in which the body of the Lord is distributed and received."

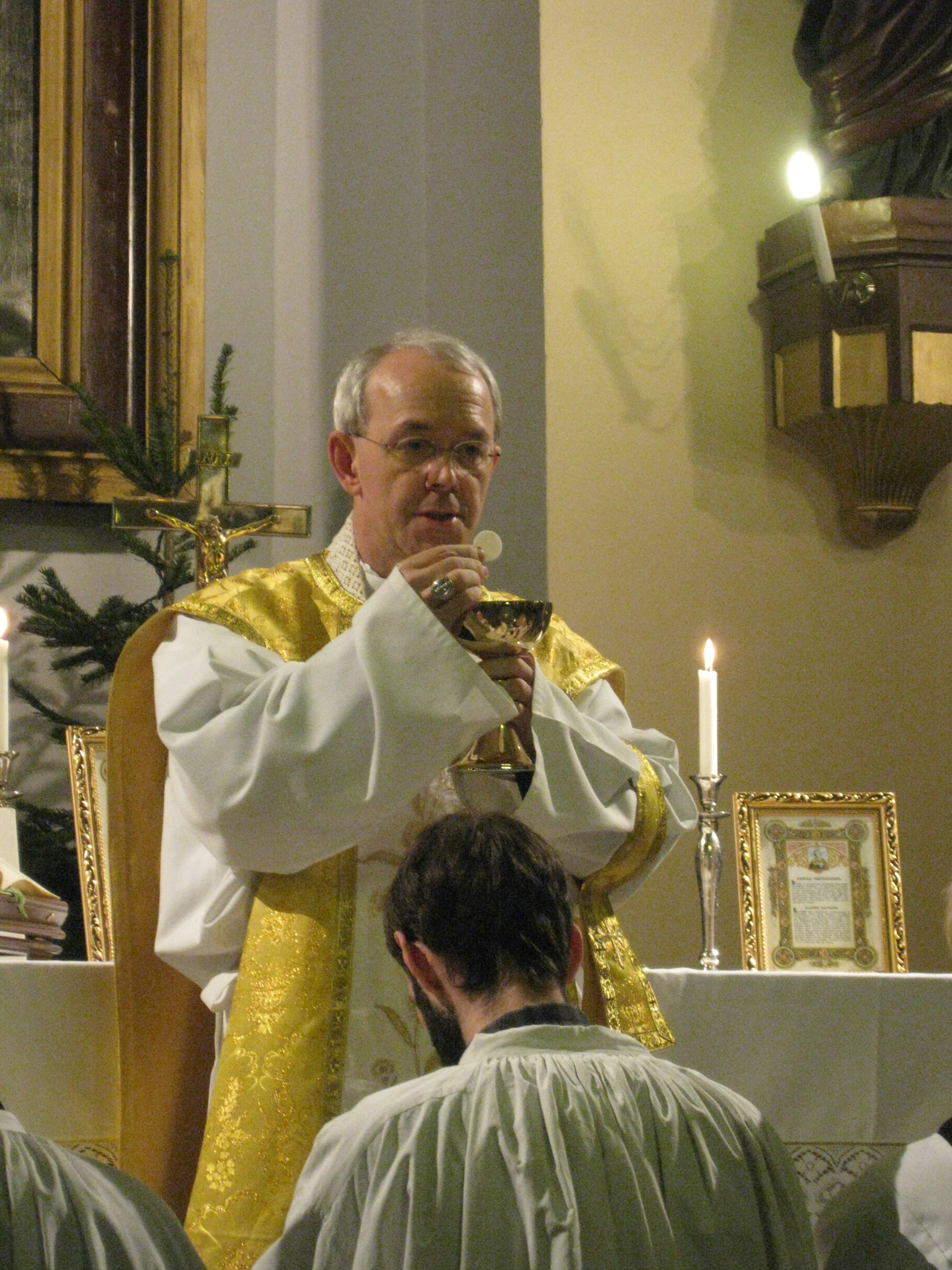
Schneider offering Mass in 2009

Schneider has upheld the traditional teaching of the Catholic Church that divorce and remarriage without a declaration of annulment constitutes the mortal sin of adultery, which condition renders a person ineligible to receive Holy Communion. In a 2014 interview, Schneider said that calls to change this practice came from "anti-Christian media". He suggested this was "a false concept of mercy", saying: "It is comparable to a doctor who gives a [diabetic] patient sugar, although he knows it will kill him." In 2016, Pope Francis released the apostolic exhortation Amoris laetitia which seemed to allow divorced and civilly remarried persons to take the Eucharist under some circumstances, and this was put into practice by some bishops, arousing intense controversy. Schneider strongly criticized this, asserting that the perennial teaching is "more powerful and surer than the discordant voice and practice of admitting unrepentant adulterers to Holy Communion, even if this practice is promoted by a single Pope or the diocesan bishops". On 7 April 2018, Schneider, along with conservative cardinals Raymond Leo Burke and Walter Brandmüller, participated in a conference rejecting the outline proposed by German bishops to allow divorced and civilly remarried Catholics to receive the Eucharist. Schneider spoke of the duty of popes to be "custodians" of authority.

=== Clergy sex abuse ===
On 25 August 2018, Archbishop Carlo Maria Viganò, former apostolic nuncio to the United States, released an 11-page letter describing a series of warnings to the Vatican regarding sexual misconduct by Theodore McCarrick, accusing Francis of failing to act on these reports and calling on him to resign. Schneider said that there was "no reasonable and plausible cause to doubt the truth content of the document". He demanded "ruthlessness and transparency" in cleansing the church of evils, particularly "homosexual cliques and networks" in the curia that he and some others have blamed for helping to cause the abuse epidemic. Schneider called on all "cardinals, bishops and priests to renounce any compromise and any flirtation with the world".

=== Interreligious relations ===
Schneider stated in a January 2013 interview that proselytizing by "false religions and sects" should be restricted in majority-Catholic counties. "When there is (a Catholic majority) then false religions and sects have not the right to make propaganda there", he said. Schneider added that this does not mean that governments can "suppress them, they can live, but (governments) cannot give them the same right to make propaganda to the detriment of Catholics".

Schneider has spoken out against Muslim immigration into Europe. He stated in 2018 that heavy Muslim immigration during the 2010s was orchestrated by "international powerful political organizations ... to take away from Europe its Christian and its national identity. It is meant to dilute the Christian and the national character of Europe." Schneider alleged that the Syrian Civil War was orchestrated by international powers to stir up a migrant crisis to de-Christianize Europe and that mass immigration into Europe from Northern Africa was likewise "artificially created".

During Pope Francis's visit to Kazakhstan in September 2022, Schneider criticized him for promoting a "supermarket of religions" from which people could freely choose. "This is not correct because there is only one true religion, which is the Catholic Church, founded by God himself, but commanded to all men, to all religions, to believe and accept his son Jesus Christ, the only savior," Schneider said.

=== Liturgy ===
Schneider is a strong promoter of the Tridentine Mass, or the "Traditional Latin Mass," the form of the Mass commonly offered in the Church for centuries but which largely fell out of use following the reforms of the Second Vatican Council, and which some conservative Catholics continue to champion. In a July 2018 interview, he rebuked priests for using "a careless and superficial–almost an entertainment style" of liturgy, adding that liturgy must be conducted with "beauty and reverence." According to Schneider, "You cannot change the liturgy by the tastes of the time. The liturgy is timeless." Schneider has offered Divine Liturgy in the Byzantine Rite numerous times, praising it as "permeated with respect, with reverence, with a supernatural spirit and adoration".

Schneider criticized Traditionis custodes, a 2021 motu proprio issued by Pope Francis which placed restrictions on the Tridentine Mass. He characterized it as an attack on the church's traditions and encouraged Catholics to maintain their attachment to the traditional form. According to Schneider, the Traditional Latin Mass is "a treasure that belongs to all saints and to the Church of all time—a sacred treasure of which no fallible administrative ordinances, even at the highest levels of the Church, can rob us". Schneider stated that in a meeting with Pope Leo XIV in December 2025, he had asked him to issue a new document on the Traditional Latin Mass to reverse the restrictions imposed on it by Pope Francis and to guarantee complete freedom for priests to conduct the liturgy according to the older form.

=== Criticism of Pope Francis and hierarchy ===
At a theological conference in Rome in December 2010, Schneider proposed the need for "a new Syllabus" (recalling the Syllabus of Errors of 1864 by Pope Pius IX), in which papal teaching authority would correct erroneous interpretations of the documents of the Second Vatican Council.

On 10 June 2019, Schneider, along with cardinals Burke and Jānis Pujats, as well as Kazakh archbishops Tomasz Peta of Astana and Jan Paweł Lenga, published a 40-point "Declaration of Truths" claiming to reaffirm traditional church teaching. The bishops wrote that such a declaration was necessary in a time of "almost universal doctrinal confusion and disorientation". Specific passages in the declaration implicitly reply to the writings of Pope Francis. The declaration states that "the religion born of faith in Jesus Christ" is the "only religion positively willed by God," seemingly alluding to the Document on Human Fraternity signed by Pope Francis, which stated that the "diversity of religions" is "willed by God." Following recent changes to the Catechism of the Catholic Church to oppose capital punishment, the declaration states that the church "did not err" in teaching that civil authorities may "lawfully exercise capital punishment" when it is "truly necessary" and to preserve the "just order of societies."

In September 2019, Schneider and Burke published an 8-page letter denouncing six alleged theological errors in the working document for the Synod of Bishops for the Pan-Amazon region, and asking that Pope Francis "confirm his brethren in the faith by an unambiguous rejection of the errors." Burke and Schneider criticized the Synod document for what they characterized as its "implicit pantheism," support for married clergy and a greater role for women in the liturgy, and excessive openness to Amazonian pagan rituals and practices. They asked the laity and clergy to pray at least one decade of the Rosary and to fast weekly for the rejection of such ideas over a 40-day period from September 17 to October 26.

In November 2023, Schneider denounced Pope Francis's decision to remove Bishop Joseph Strickland from his diocese. Strickland was a frequent critic of Pope Francis. "This will go down in history as a great injustice against a bishop who did only his task in a time of confusion," Schneider said. He lamented what he called an "internal persecution of faithful Catholics" while bishops and cardinals who were "publicly distorting or undermining the faith" went unpunished.

Schneider was critical of the November 2025 document Mater Populi Fidelis published by the Dicastery for the Doctrine of the Faith, which rejected the use of the title of Co-Redemptrix for the Virgin Mary. He alleged that the document conflicted with centuries of Catholic theological teaching which upheld this role for Mary. Schneider maintained that it was impossible that "the Church's saints, doctors, and popes have for centuries led the faithful astray."

=== Credo ===
In 2023, Schneider published Credo: Compendium of the Catholic Faith with Sophia Institute Press, a catechism written from a traditionalist perspective. It received an imprimatur by Bishop Peter Anthony Libasci of Manchester. The catechism was endorsed by Cardinal Robert Sarah and bishops Elias Nassar and Strickland, as well as theologian Scott Hahn, who praised it as clear and thorough. Credo has received attention for its focus on issues particular to traditionalist Catholicism, especially its intended "clarification" of allegedly ambiguous statements in the documents of the Second Vatican Council and the Catechism of the Catholic Church, for which it has been both praised and criticized.

=== Society of Saint Pius X ===
Schneider has been largely supportive of the Society of Saint Pius X, a traditionalist priestly society founded in the immediate aftermath of the Second Vatican Council which rejects many of the Council's reforms and operates independently of Vatican authorities. Under Pope Francis, Schneider was an official visitor to the Society. In 2026, after the Society announced its intention to consecrate new bishops without papal authorization, Schneider encouraged Pope Leo XIV to approve the consecrations. The Society carried out the consecration of four new bishops on July 1, 2026, against express papal prohibition, resulting in the Vatican declaring the entire Society and its lay following excommunicated. In August, Schneider issued a public statement implying support for the Society's actions, framing its position as a choice between obeying the Pope and preserving the authentic Catholic Faith. He endorsed the Society's doctrinal positions and critiques of statements from the Holy See.

== Bibliography ==
- Schneider, Athanasius (1999). "Propter sanctam ecclesiam suam": die Kirche als Geschöpf, Frau und Bau im Bussunterricht des Pastor Hermae (in German). Rome: Patristic Institute Augustinianum. ISBN 88-7961-030-9. LCCN 00688210.
- Schneider, Athanasius (2008). Dominus Est, it is the Lord: Reflections of a Bishop of Central Asia on Holy Communion [Dominus est, riflessioni di un vescovo dell' Asia Centrale sulla sacra Comunione]. Translated by Gregoris, Nicholas L. Pine Beach, N.J.: Newman House Press. ISBN 978-0-9778846-1-2. LCCN 2011276875.
- Schneider, Athanasius (2019). Christus Vincit: Christ's Triumph Over the Darkness of the Age: In conversation with Diane Montagna, Angelico Press, ISBN 978-1-62138-490-8.
- Schneider, Athanasius (2021). The Springtime That Never Came: Bishop Athanasius Schneider in conversation with Pawel Lisicki, Sophia Institute Press, ISBN 978-1-64413-513-6
- Schneider, Athanasius (2021). The Catholic Mass: Steps to Restore the Centrality of God in the Liturgy by Athanasius Schneider with Aurelio Porfiri Translated by Diane Montagna, Sophia Institute Press, ISBN 978-1-64413-540-2.
- Schneider, Athanasius (2023). Credo. Compendium of the Catholic Faith. Sophia Institute Press, ISBN 978-1-64413-940-0.
- Schneider, Athanasius (2024). Flee from Heresy: A Catholic Guide to Ancient and Modern Errors, Sophia Institute Press, ISBN 9798889113188.
