= Diocese of Karaganda =

Diocese of the Catholic Church in Kazakhstan

Coordinates: 49.7811°N 73.1345°E

Diocese of Karaganda Dioecesis Karagandansis Карагандинская епархия Qaraǵandy qalasynyń eparhiyasy
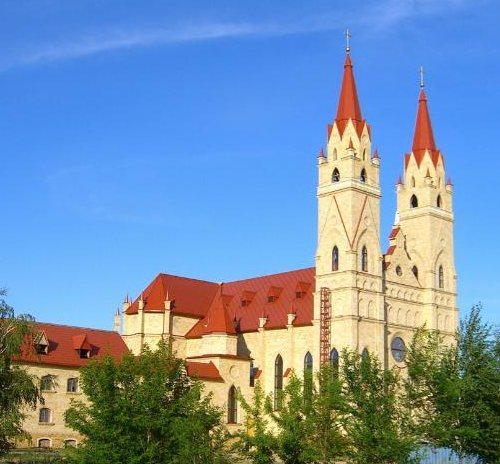

Location
- Country: Kazakhstan
- Ecclesiastical province: Maria Santissima in Astana
- Metropolitan: Maria Santissima in Astana

Statistics
- Area: 711,300 km^{2} (274,600 sq mi)
- Population: Total; Catholics: (as of 2013); 3,590,000; 31,300 (0.9%)
- Parishes: Karaganda: St. Joseph Parish; Karaganda: Maria Mother of the Church Parish; Abaj: Annunciation of the Lord Parish; Temirtau: St. Andrew Parish; Balkhash: St. Francis of Assisi Parish; Zhezkazgan: Transfiguration of our Lord Parish

Information
- Denomination: Catholic
- Sui iuris church: Latin Church
- Rite: Roman Rite
- Established: 13 April 1991
- Cathedral: Cathedral of Our Lady of Fatima, Karaganda

Current leadership
- Pope: Leo XIV
- Bishop: Piotr Pytlowany
- Metropolitan Archbishop: Tomasz Peta
- Auxiliary Bishops: Yevgeniy Zinkovskiy
- Bishops emeritus: Jan Paul Lenga

Map
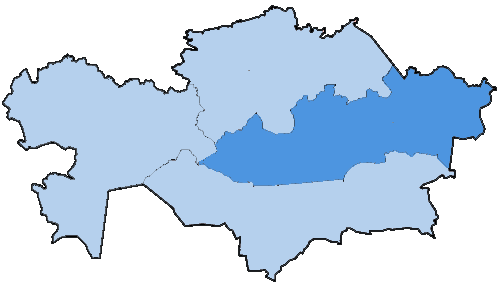

Website
- catholic-kazakhstan.org/Karag/En

The Diocese of Karaganda is a Latin diocese of the Catholic Church, suffragan in the ecclesiastical province of the Metropolitan of Mary Most Holy in Astana, yet remains subject to the missionary Congregation for the Evangelization of Peoples.

Its cathedral episcopal see is the Marian Cathedral of Our Lady of Fatima, in the city of Karaganda in Kazakhstan. The city also had the former Cathedral of St. Joseph.

== History ==
On 13 April 1991 the Apostolic Administration of Kazakhstan was established on vast territory, most of ex-Soviet Turkestan, split off from the Diocese of Vladivostok.

On 29 September 1997, territory was split off to form the Mission sui juris of Uzbekistan, the Mission sui juris of Tajikistan and the Mission sui juris of Turkmenistan. Additionally, on 22 December 1997, further territory was removed from the Apostolic Administration to establish the Mission sui juris of Kyrgyzstan.

The Apostolic Administration was promoted on 7 July 1999 as the Diocese of Karaganda, losing further territory to establish the Apostolic Administration of Astana, the Apostolic Administration of Almaty and the Apostolic Administration of Atyrau.

== Statistics ==
As per 2014, the diocese pastorally served 8,340 Catholics (0.2% of the territory's 3,640,000 total) on 711,208 km² in 19 parishes and 2 missions with 19 priests (15 diocesan, 4 religious) and 38 lay religious (4 brothers, 34 sisters).

== Episcopal ordinaries ==
(all Roman Rite)

Apostolic Administrator of Kazakhstan

- Jan Pawel Lenga, M.I.C. (13 April 1991—7 July 1999 see below), Ukrainian; Titular Bishop of Arba (13 April 1991—7 July 1999)

Suffragan Bishops of Karaganda

- Jan Pawel Lenga, M.I.C. (see above 7 July 1999—17 May 2003), personally promoted Archbishop-Bishop of Karaganda (emeritate 17 May 2003—5 February 2011)
- Janusz Wiesław Kaleta (5 February 2011—15 July 2014), Polish; previously Titular Bishop of Phelbes (15 September 2006—5 February 2011) as Apostolic Administrator of Atyrau (Kazakhstan) (7 July 1999—5 February 2011) and later Apostolic Administrator ad nutum Sanctae Sedis of above Atyrau (5 February 2011—7 December 2012); lay state since 30 May 2016
- Adelio Dell’Oro (31 January 2015–10 August 2026), Italian; previously Titular Bishop of Castulo (7 December 2012—31 January 2015) as Apostolic Administrator of Atyrau (7 December 2012—16 May 2015)
- Piotr Pytlowany (since 10 August 2026)

=== Auxiliary bishops ===
- Athanasius Schneider, O.R.C., titular bishop of Celerina (8 April 2006 – 11 February 2011)
- Yevgeniy Zinkovskiy, titular bishop of Maiuca (since 29 June 2021)

== See also ==
- List of Catholic dioceses in Central Asia

== Sources ==
- GCatholic, with Google map and satellite photo - data for all sections
