= Ruthenian Catholic Apostolic Administration of Târgul-Siret =

The Ruthenian Catholic Apostolic Administration of Târgul-Siret was a short-lived 20th century Interbellum permanent Apostolic Administration (pre-diocesan missionary jurisdiction) of the Ruthenian Greek Catholic Church sui iuris (Eastern Catholic, notably Byzantine Rite) in Romania.

== History ==
It was established in 1922 on territory without proper Ordinary of the particular church sui iuris and suppressed in 1930. No incumbent recorded.

== Source and External links ==
- GCatholic
