= Jan Paweł Lenga =

Polish Catholic prelate (born 1950)

His Excellency Jan Paweł Lenga MIC
- Archbishop Emeritus of Karaganda
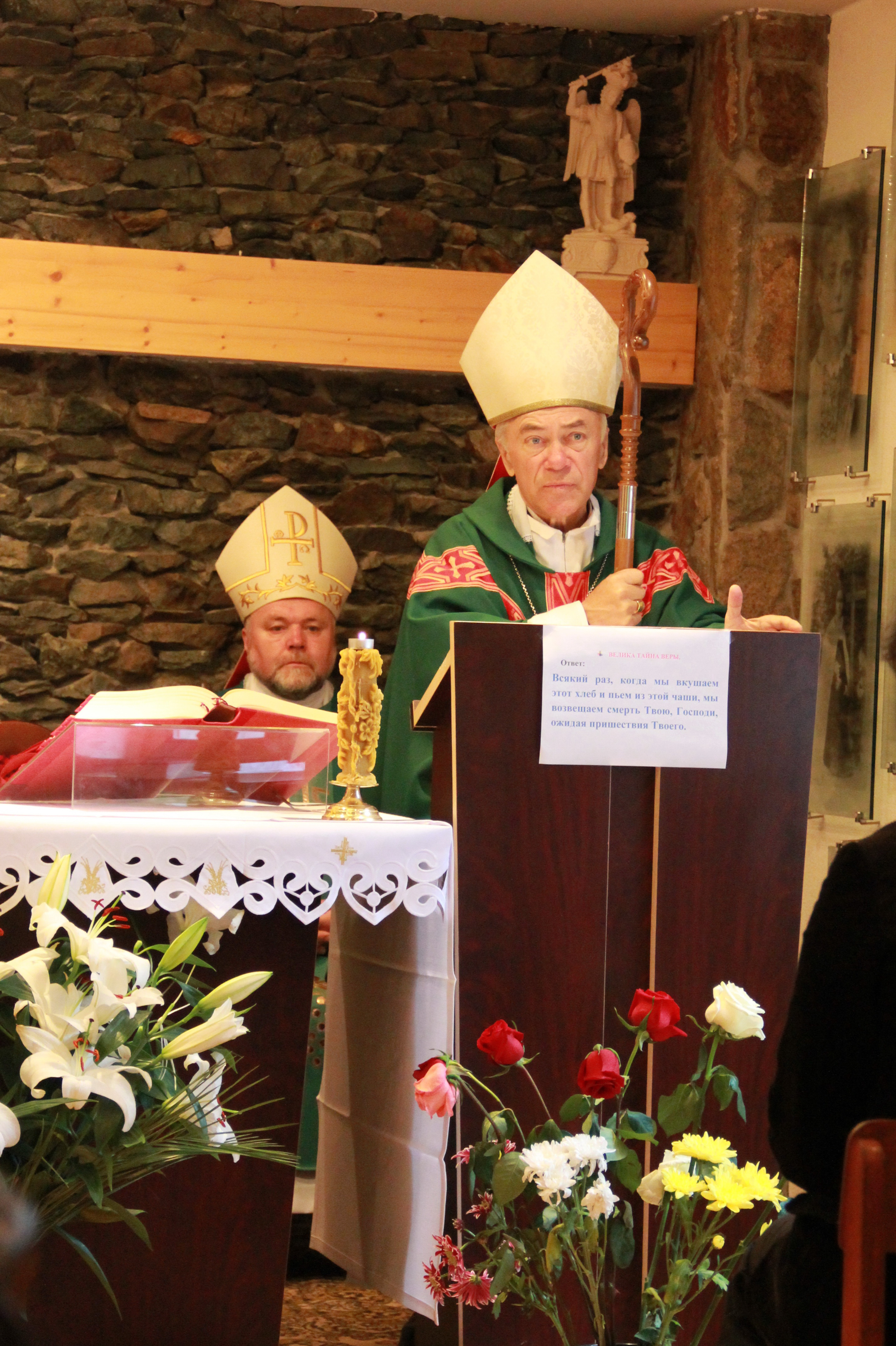
- Church: Catholic
- Diocese: Karaganda
- Appointed: 7 July 1999
- Term ended: 5 February 2011
- Successor: Janusz Kaleta
- Previous post: Apostolic Administrator of Kazakhstan & Titular Bishop of Arba (1991-1999)

Orders
- Ordination: 28 May 1980 by Vincentas Sladkevičius
- Consecration: 28 May 1991 by Francesco Colasuonno
- Rank: Archbishop

Personal details
- Born: 28 March 1950 (age 76): Grodek Podolski; (now Horodok, Khmelnytskyi Oblast, Ukraine)

Jan Paweł Lenga (born 28 March 1950) is a Polish Catholic prelate who served as the Archbishop of the Diocese of Karaganda in Kazakhstan from 1999 to 2011.

== Biography ==
His family moved to Latvia, where the former chaplain worked on the railroad. Lenga spent his one-year novitiate in the Marian Order, then spent a week visiting a monk, his spiritual mentor. From Latvia, he moved to Kaunas, Lithuania where there was one of only two Catholic seminaries in the then Soviet Union. He secretly graduated from the seminary and was ordained in secret on 28 May 1980 by Bishop Vincentas Sladkevicius. In 1981, he arrived in Kazakhstan, where he performed pastoral ministry for 10 years. Lenga was appointed Apostolic Administrator of Kazakhstan and Central Asia, and Titular Bishop of Arba on 13 April 1991. He was consecrated a bishop on 28 May 1991. Lenga was next appointed bishop of Karaganda on 6 August 1999. He received the personal title of Archbishop on 17 May 2003.

On 5 February 2011 Pope Benedict XVI accepted the resignation of Lenga, which he admittedly filed in accord with canon 401 § 2 of the Code of Canon Law. Diocesan bishops, who due to ill health or some other compelling reason are not fully able to perform their duties, are urged to submit their resignation. However, Archbishop Lenga denies ever filing such a resignation. Lenga was appointed as the successor to the apostolic administrator of Atyrau, Bishop Janusz Kaleta. At this time, the retired archbishop was a resident of the monastic house of the Congregation of priests.

== Declaration of Truths ==
On 10 June 2019, Lenga, along with cardinals Raymond Leo Burke and Jānis Pujats, with Kazakh bishops Athanasius Schneider and Tomasz Peta published a 40-point "Declaration of Truths" claiming to reaffirm traditional Church teaching. The bishops wrote that such a declaration was necessary in a time of "almost universal doctrinal confusion and disorientation." Specific passages in the declaration implicitly relate to several writings by Pope Francis. The declaration states that "the religion born of faith in Jesus Christ" is the "only religion positively willed by God," seemingly alluding to the Document on Human Fraternity signed by Pope Francis on February 4, which stated that the "diversity of religions" is "willed by God." Following recent changes to the Catechism to oppose capital punishment, the declaration states that the Church "did not err" in teaching that civil authorities may "lawfully exercise capital punishment" when it is "truly necessary" and to preserve the "just order of societies."

== Awards ==
Lenga was awarded the Commander's Cross of the Order of Merit of the Republic of Poland in recognition of outstanding merits in the activities for the benefit of Polish diaspora as well as in promoting Polish culture in Kazakhstan. The award was presented to archbishop Jan Paweł Lenga on 2 September 2011 on behalf of the President of Poland Bronisław Komorowski by Piotr Florek, the voivode of Greater Poland Voivodeship.
