= Apostolic Administration of Atyrau =

Catholic pastoral area in Kazakhstan

Coordinates: 47.1137°N 51.9037°E

Apostolic Administration of Atyrau Apostolica Administratio Atirauensis Апостольская администратура Атырау
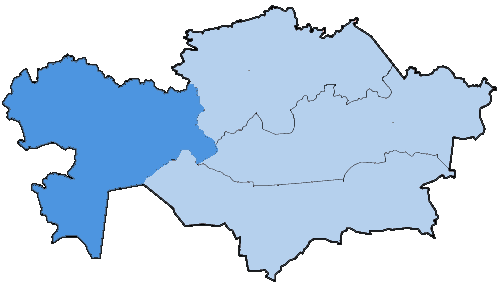

Location
- Country: Kazakhstan
- Ecclesiastical province: Maria Santissima in Astana
- Metropolitan: Maria Santissima in Astana

Statistics
- Area: 736.257 km^{2} (284.270 sq mi)
- Population: Total; Catholics: (as of 01.01.2026); 3 187 514; 2 650 (0,09%)
- Parishes: 7
- Churches: 7
- Congregations: 1

Information
- Denomination: Catholic
- Sui iuris church: Latin Church
- Rite: Roman Rite
- Established: 7 July 1999

Current leadership
- Pope: Leo XIV
- Apostolic Administrator: Peter Sakmár
- Metropolitan Archbishop: Tomasz Peta
- Bishops emeritus: Dariusz Buras

Map
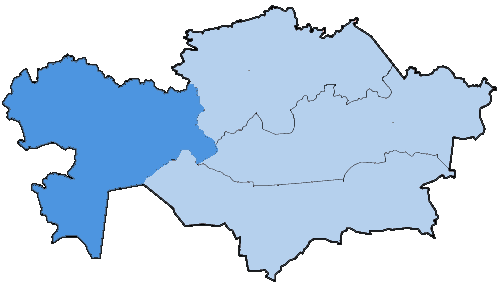

The Apostolic Administration of Atyrau is a pastoral area sui iuris, not yet fully a diocese, in western Kazakhstan which forms part of the Catholic Church in this country, namely of the metropolitan Archdiocese of Mary Most Holy in Astana.

It covers the territory of Western Kazakhstan (736 257 km²), which is inhabited by 3 187 514 people as of 1 January 2026. The number of Catholics is estimated at around 2 633.

Its head is a prelate called Apostolic Administrator, member of the Catholic Bishops' Conference of Central Asia. His see is the Cathedral of the Transfiguration of Our Lord, in Atyrau. Current Administrator is a Slovak priest, Fr. Peter Sakmár. Former Apostolic Administrator, Italian Bishop Adelio Dell'Oro became the diocesan bishop of the Diocese of Karaganda.

== History ==
In Kazakhstan, church structures could only develop after the fall of communism.

On 13 April 1991, the Apostolic Administration for Kazakhstan and Central Asia was established. The apostolic administration of Atyrau against the background of the whole of Kazakhstan.

On 7 July 1999 by the decree of the Congregation for the Evangelization of Peoples, Kazakhstan was divided into four ecclesiastical units: the diocese of Karaganda and three apostolic administrations: in Astana, Almaty and Atyrau.

Another reorganization of the structures of Catholic dioceses in Kazakhstan on 17 May 2003 led to the establishment of the Archdiocese of Mary Most Holy in Astana, to which the following are subordinate: the Diocese of Karaganda, the Diocese of Most Holy Trinity in Almaty, and the apostolic administration in Atyrau.

In 1978, until 1999, there was only one parish in Western Kazakhstan – in Aktyubinsk and a prayer house in Khromtau, 100 km away. One priest worked here. In 1999, a pastoral ministry was established in Atyrau (registration itself took place in 2003), then in 2003 a parish was founded in Uralsk. In 2004, parishes in Kulsary and Khromtau were registered, and the parish in Aktau in 2007. On 19 March 2021, a parish in Aksay was established by Peter Sakmár.

== Administrators ==
- Janusz Kaleta (1999.07.07 – 2011.02.05), Titular Bishop of Phelbes (2006.09.15 – 2011.02.05);
  - stayed on as Apostolic Administrator ad nutum Sanctae Sedis of Atyrau (Kazakhstan) (2011.02.05 – 2012.12.07) while elevated to the see of Karaganda, then went on solely as Bishop of Karaganda
- Adelio Dell’Oro (2012.12.07 – 2015.05.16), Titular Bishop of Castulo
- Fr. Dariusz Buras (2015.05.16 – 2020.12.08)
- Fr. Peter Sakmár Apostolic Administrator ad nutum Sanctae Sedis of Atyrau (2020.12.08 – ...)

== Ministry ==
Currently (as of September 2026) 14 priests exercise pastoral ministry in the territory of the Administration: eight Poles, including four from the Tarnów Diocese, two from the Archdiocese of Warsaw, and one each from the Archdiocese of Lublin and the Archdiocese of Białystok. Furthermore, there are two Slovaks; two Filipinos; a citizen of Kazakhstan and a Belarusian who was ordained in the Archdiocese of Warsaw (after formation at the Redemptoris Mater Seminary).

On June 29 2020, permanent deacon Jerzy Demski was ordained in Opole, and in October 2020 he was incardinated into the apostolic administration of Atyrau.

Currently, two nuns serve here – from congregation susters of the Elizabethan Sisters (Atyrau).

== Parishes ==
There are several churches in the main cities of Western Kazakhstan which belong to the Apostolic Administration of Aturau.

- The Good Shepherd Church in Aktobe (from 21 October 1993)
- Our Lady of Perpetual Help Church in Uralsk (from 25 March 2003)
- Cathedral church of the Transfiguration of Our Lord in Atyrau (from 6 August 2003)
- Divine Mercy Church in Kulsary (from 2 February 2004)
- Holy Family Church in Khromtau (from 4 February 2004)
- Sacred Heart Church in Aktau (from 10 January 2007)
- Saint Joseph Church in Aksay (from 18 March 2021)

== Priests incardinated in the Atyrau Administration ==
- Fr. Ruslan Mursaitov – ordained a priest on 1 May 2017
- Fr. Milan Patrick Napal CJD – ordained a priest on 2 April 2019
- Fr. Lacapag Ronald Lamban – ordained a priest on 6 August 2021
- Fr. Millanas Felipe Jr. Membreve – ordained a priest on 8 September 2026

== See also ==
- Catholic Church in Kazakhstan
