= Catholic Church in Kazakhstan =

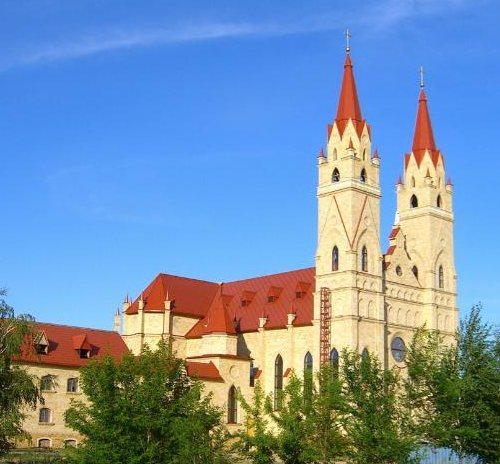
Karaganda cathedral

The Catholic Church in Kazakhstan is part of the worldwide Catholic Church, under the spiritual leadership of the Pope in Rome.

== Demographics ==
The 2021 census noted that Kazakhstan is 17.19% Christian. Other figures suggest that less than 1% of the population is Catholic. This is approximately 125,000 people, or half of the membership that the church had in 2007.

In 2020, there were 104 priests and 133 nuns serving 81 parishes in the country.

In 2007, most Catholics in the country were ethnic Poles, Germans and Lithuanians; the population of Catholics had decreased after the fall of communism as many German Catholics emigrated to Germany. There were also 3,000 Greek Catholics, also referred to as Eastern Rite Catholics, in the country.

== History ==
In the second century AD, Christian Roman prisoners of war were taken to what is now Kazakhstan after their defeat by the Sassanid Persians. A bishop's see existed in the fourth century, and there was also a Melkite monastery in the late fourth and early fifth centuries.

A Franciscan monk, William of Rubruck travelled around Kazakhstan in 1254 and met Möngke Khan and Sartaq Khan (great-grandson of Genghis Khan). A few years later Pope Nicholas III established the Diocese of Kipciak.

=== Communist period ===
The head of the Soviet Union Joseph Stalin caused a great increase in the Catholic population of Kazakhstan by the deportation of Catholics and their clergy to concentration camps in the country. Some of the priests later decided to help build the church in that country. In the late 1960s, two Catholic churches were registered, one in Alma-Ata and one in Kustanai, and later disbanded and were re-registered.

=== 1991 to the present ===
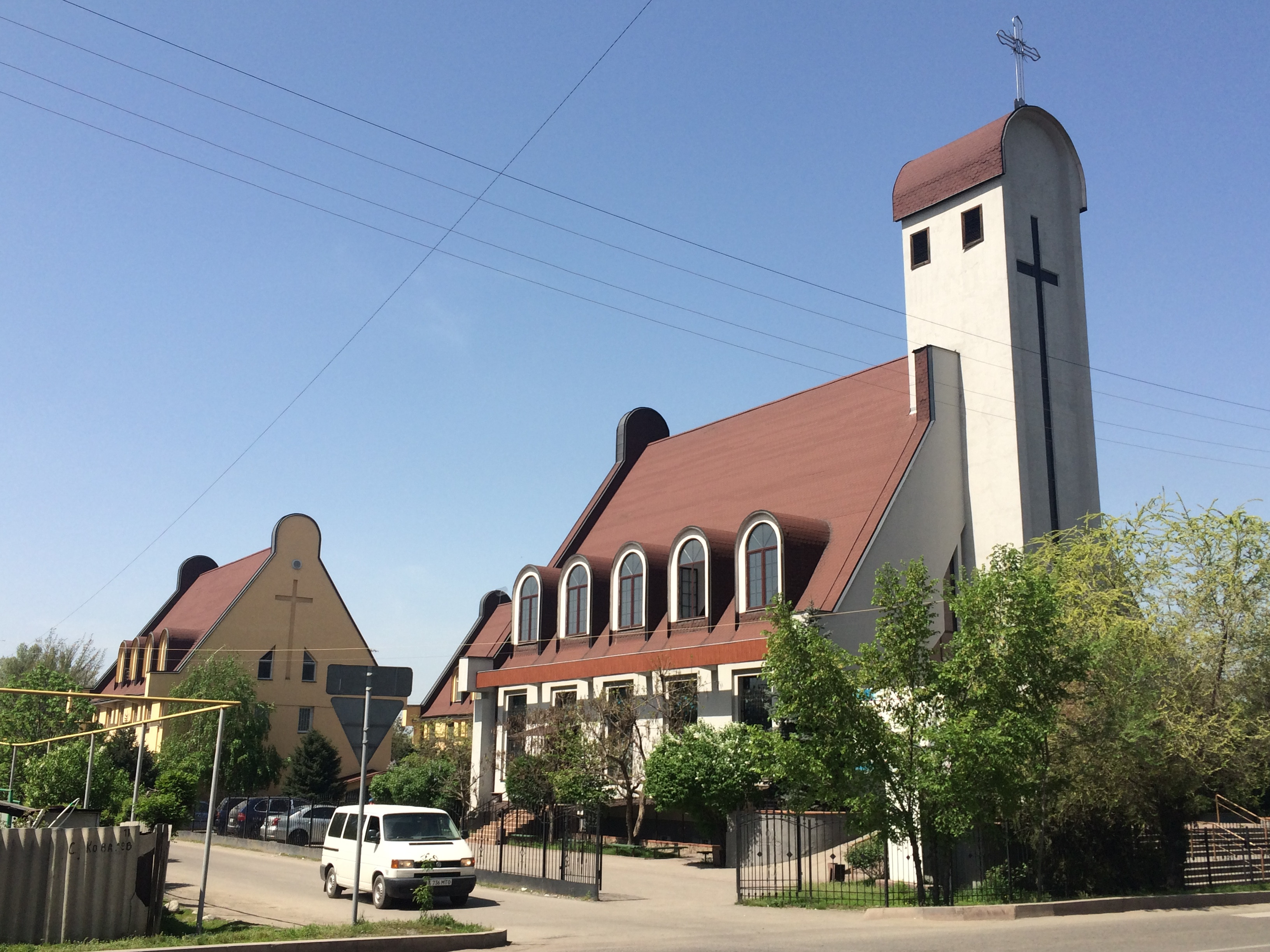
The Cathedral of the Holy Trinity in Almaty

With the fall of communism in 1991, the Catholic community fully came back out into the open. In 1991, Pope John Paul II established an Apostolic Administration that covered all of Central Asia. Diplomatic relations between the Holy See and Kazakhstan were established in 1994. In 1997, the other four countries of the region, Kyrgyzstan, Tajikistan, Turkmenistan, and Uzbekistan all became independent missions, so the Apostolic Administration became for only Kazakhstan and was based in Karaganda. In 1999, the apostolic administration was split in four; three new apostolic administrations were created, based in Almaty, Astana, and Atyrau, and a diocese was created in Karaganda. Pope John Paul II became the first Pope to visit Kazakhstan in the country's history in 2001. In 2003, John Paul II elevated Astana to an archdiocese and Almaty to a diocese. In 2006, Catholic priests were ordained for the first time ever in the country.

Bishop José Luis Mumbiela Sierra, of Almaty Diocese, described the variety of the Catholic population in Kazakhstan during a conference with Aid to the Church in Need: "A large proportion of the Catholics live in the north of the country, where there is a Polish majority. In the larger cities there is a bigger mix of people. For example, there are many Koreans, from past deportations, who are Catholic. There are also people from non-Christian populations who converted to Catholicism. It is like a river that keeps flowing, because people are attracted by the Church’s message."

In 2008, the Church in Kazakhstan affirmed its Asiatic identity when its episcopal conference was formally accepted into the Federation of Asian Bishops' Conferences.

In 2022 three of the Catholic Church's bishops issued calls for peace, following the episodes of civil unrest that led to hundreds of deaths in the country.

=== Byzantine Rite faithful ===
In 1996 here was appointed by the Holy See an Apostolic Visitor, who was replaced in 2002 by Apostolic Delegate, who depended from the Congregation for the Oriental Churches. But on 1 June 2019 by Pope Francis was established the Apostolic Administration of Kazakhstan and Central Asia for the all Byzantine Rite (mainly Ukrainian Greek Catholic) parishes. The circumscription encompasses Kazakhstan and others four Central Asia states.

Location of dioceses in Kazakhstan

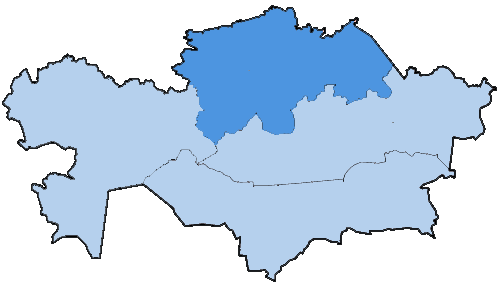
Catholic Archdiocese of Mary Most Holy in Astana

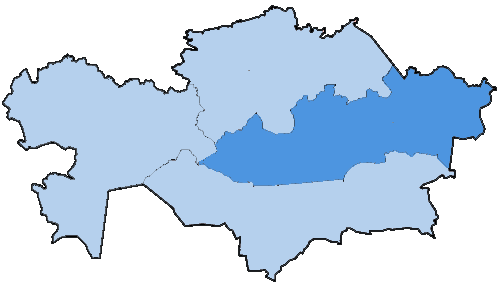
Catholic Diocese of Karaganda

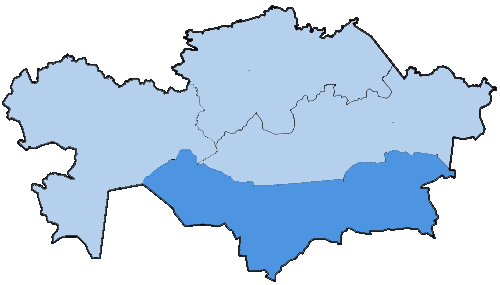
Catholic Diocese of Most Holy Trinity in Almaty

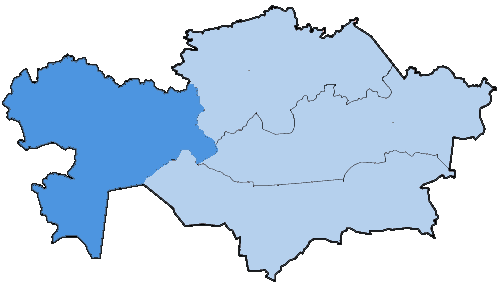
Apostolic Administration of Atyrau

== See also ==
- Religion in Kazakhstan
- Christianity in Kazakhstan
- Eastern Orthodoxy in Kazakhstan
- List of Saints from Asia
