= Oleksiy Zaryckyy =

Ukrainian Catholic priest (1912–1963)

Blessed Oleksiy Zaryckyy
- Born: 17 October 1912; Bilche, Austrian Galicia, Austria-Hungary (now Bilche, Ukraine)
- Died: 30 October 1963 (aged 51); Karaganda, Kazakh SSR, Soviet Union (now near Karaganda, Kazakhstan)
- Venerated in: Ukrainian Greek Catholic Church
- Beatified: 27 June 2001, Lviv, Ukraine by Pope John Paul II

Oleksiy Vasyliovych Zaryckyy (Ukrainian: Олексій Васильович Зарицький; 17 October 1912 — 30 October 1963) was a priest of the Ukrainian Greek Catholic Church. On 27 June 2001, he was beatified by Pope John Paul II.

== Biography ==
Zaryckyy was born in the village of Bilche in the Lviv region. From 1922 to 1931, he studied at the Stryya State Gymnasium. In 1931, he entered the theological seminary of the Archdiocese of Lviv. He was ordained in 1936 by Metropolitan Andrey Sheptytsky and served as a pastor in the villages of Stynava Nizhnya, Strutyn, Ryasne-Ruske and Ryasne-Polske.

In 1946, he was arrested for refusing to convert to Russian Orthodoxy and spent six months in the Zolochiv prison.

On 10 October 1947, he was arrested and imprisoned in Lontsky prison in Lviv. On 29 May 1948, he was sentenced to eight years of imprisonment in correctional labor camps and sent to the Taishetlag concentration camp in the vicinity of Irkutsk. He was transported to Dubravlag concentration camp in Mordovia. His last resettlement was to the Omlag concentration camp in Siberia, near Omsk. He was released on 31 December 1954, without the right to return to Ukraine.

On 26 October 1957, Zaryckyy was rehabilitated by a military tribunal. In the same year, he launched extensive missionary activity among representatives of various nationalities. He conducted not only Byzantine Rite Divine Services (for Ukrainians and Russians), but also the Roman Rite (for Germans and Poles). He served as a missionary in the territories of Samara, Ural, Orenburg, and Kazakhstan. He changed his place of residence several times. Not registered anywhere, with only his passport on him, he continued his missionary work, regardless of the fact that he could be arrested again. Between the years 1955–1961, he was detained several times by the police, but he was only warned and released.

In April 1962, Zaryckyy arrived in Karaganda, where on 9 May of the same year, he was also arrested on charges of vagrancy and sentenced to two years of imprisonment in the Dolinka settlement of the Karaganda region. He worked as a tailor and his health deteriorated. Zaryckyy died on 30 October 1963, in the Dolinka camp near Karaganda. He was buried there, but with the efforts of the local Catholic community, as well as relatives and his former parishioners from Western Ukraine, he was reburied twice. He is now buried in the cemetery in the village of Ryasne-Rusk.

== Beatification ==
Zaryckyy was beatified on 27 June 2001, in the city of Lviv in a Byzantine rite liturgy with the participation of Pope John Paul II.
