= Jan Stefan Gałecki =

Polish bishop (1932–2021)

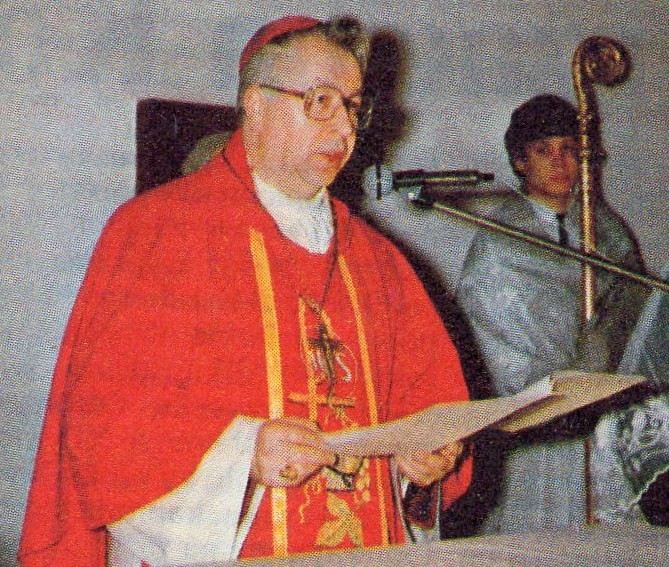
Gałecki in 1987

Jan Stefan Gałecki (18 June 1932 in Zalesie, Przasnysz County – 27 April 2021 in Szczecin) was a Polish Roman Catholic titular and auxiliary bishop.

== Biography ==
Gałecki was born in Poland and was ordained to the priesthood in 1957. He served as titular bishop of Maiuca and as auxiliary bishop of the Roman Catholic Archdiocese of Szczecin-Kamień, Poland, from 1974 to 2007.
