= Roman Catholic Archdiocese of Mary Most Holy in Astana =

Latin archdiocese of the Catholic Church in Kazakhstan

Coordinates: 51.1538°N 71.4519°E

Archdiocese of Maria Santissima in Astana Archidioecesis Sanctae Mariae in Astanansis

Location
- Country: Kazakhstan
- Ecclesiastical province: Maria Santissima in Astana
- Deaneries: Astana; Kokshetau; Kostanay; Pavlodar; Petropavlovsk

Statistics
- Area: 576,400 km^{2} (222,500 sq mi)
- Population: Total; Catholics: (as of 2013); 3,650,000; 60,000 (1,6%)
- Parishes: 34

Information
- Denomination: Catholic
- Sui iuris church: Latin Church
- Rite: Roman Rite
- Established: 7 July 1999
- Cathedral: Our Mother of Perpetual Help Cathedral
- Secular priests: 17

Current leadership
- Pope: Leo XIV
- Metropolitan Archbishop: Tomasz Peta
- Auxiliary Bishops: Athanasius Schneider
- Vicar General: ?

Map
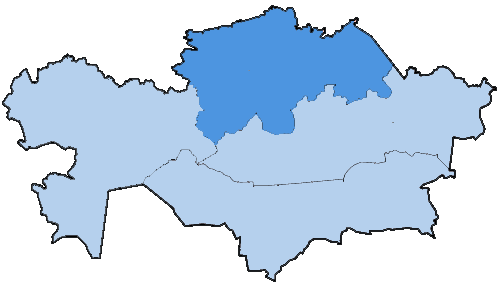

The Archdiocese of Mary Most Holy in Astana (Kazakh: Астана қаласындағы Әулие Мариям Архиепархиясы, romanized: Astana qalasyndağy Äulie Mariiam Arhieparhiiasy, Latin: Archidioecesis Sanctae Mariae in Astanansis) is a Latin Church archdiocese of the Catholic Church in Kazakhstan.

Its cathedral episcopal see is the Marian Cathedral of Our Mother of Perpetual Help, in the Kazakh capital of Astana. The founding and only apostolic administrator, Tomasz Peta, was appointed the first Archbishop of Mary Most Holy in Astana by John Paul II on May 17, 1999.

== History ==
Pope John Paul II erected it as the Apostolic Administration of Astana on July 7, 1999, with territory split off from the Apostolic Administration of Kazakhstan (which lost more territory and became the Diocese of Karaganda, and unusually,, to its daughter dioceses which became suffragans of Astana). He visited it in September 2001.

The same pope promoted it to the Archdiocese of Mary Most Holy in Astana on May 17, 2003.

== Province ==
Its ecclesiastical province comprises the metropolitan's own archdiocese and the following suffragan jurisdictions :

- Diocese of Karaganda (its parent diocese)
- Diocese of Most Holy Trinity in Almaty.
- Apostolic Administration of Atyrau (a pre-diocesan type of jurisdiction which normally remains exempt, i.e. directly dependent on the Holy See)

== Ordinaries of Astana ==
(all Roman Rite, so far European Latin missionaries)

Apostolic Administrator of Astana

- Tomasz Peta (7 Jul 1999 – 17 May 2003), Titular Bishop of Benda, Albania (15 Feb 2001 – 17 May 2003)

Metropolitan Archbishops of Astana

- Tomasz Peta (17 May 2003 – ... ), also President of Episcopal Conference of Kazakhstan (May 2003 – ... )

== See also ==
- Catholic Church in Kazakhstan

== Sources and external links ==
- GCatholic.org, with incumbent biography links
- Catholic-Hierarchy
