= Maiuca =

During the Roman Empire Maiuca was a Roman town, of the Roman province of Mauretania Caesariensis, now lost to history, but that flourished in late antiquity but did not last long after the Muslim conquest of the Maghreb. The town was the seat of an ancient bishopric, but we have lost all records of that institution, though it survives today as a titular see of the Roman Catholic Church. The current Bishop is Jan Stefan Gałecki.
