= Tomasz Peta =

Polish Catholic Archbishop

His Excellency Tomasz Bernard Peta
- Archbishop of Maria Santissima in Astana
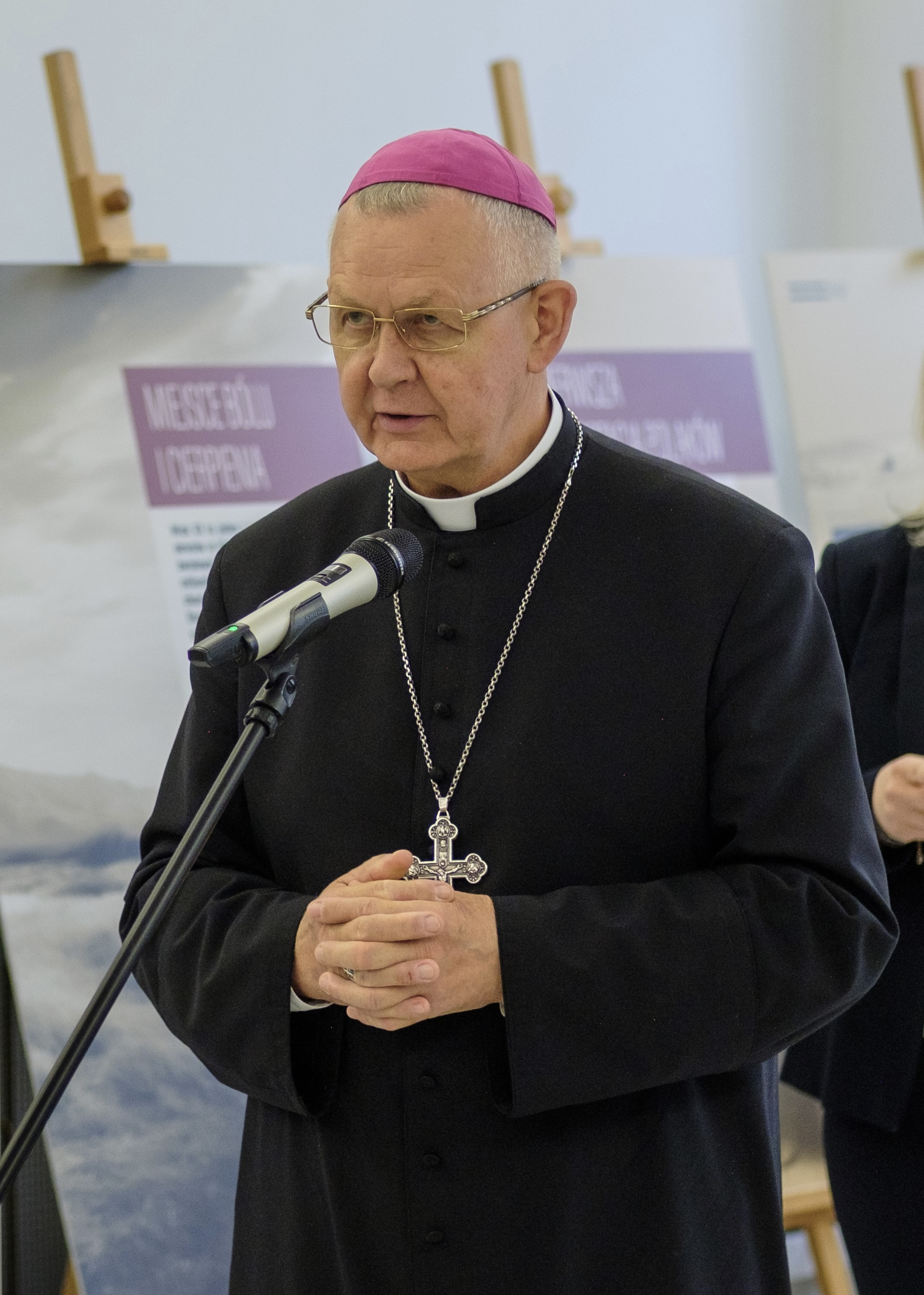
- Church: Catholic Church
- Archdiocese: Mary Most Holy in Astana
- Province: Kazakhstan
- Appointed: 17 May 2003
- Previous post: Apostolic Administrator of Astana (1999-2003)

Orders
- Ordination: 5 June 1976 by Stefan Wyszyński
- Consecration: 19 March 2001 by John Paul II
- Rank: Metropolitan Archbishop

Personal details
- Born: 20 August 1951 (age 75) Inowrocław, Poland
- Denomination: Catholic
- Residence: Astana, Kazakhstan

Tomasz Bernard Peta (Russian: Томаш Бернард Пэта; born on 20 August 1951) is the current Catholic Archbishop of the Metropolitan Archdiocese of Saint Mary in the city of Astana, and the President of the Bishops' Conference of Kazakhstan from May 19, 2003. He speaks Polish, Russian, and Kazakh and is a citizen of Kazakhstan.

== Priesthood ==
On 5 June 1976, Peta was ordained to the priesthood from the diocese of Gniezno by Cardinal Stefan Wyszyński. He began his work in Kazakhstan on 21 August 1990 as the parish of Mary - Queen of Peace in the village of Lakeside Tayynshinsky region of North Kazakhstan region. On 6 August 1999 Pope John Paul II appointed him Apostolic Administrator in Astana. On 19 March 2001 by decision of the Holy See, Peta was ordained bishop. On 17 May 2003 the Pope raised the Apostolic Administration in Astana to the level of archdiocese titled Archdiocese of Saint Mary in Astana. Then, on June 16, 2003, Tomasz Peta was appointed Archbishop, Metropolitan Archdiocese of St. Mary in Astana. On 19 May 2003, he was elected President of the Conference of Bishops of Kazakhstan. On 1 April 2008 Pope Benedict XVI appointed the Metropolitan Tomasz Peta to the Congregation for the Clergy, dealing with life and work of the priests.

== Declaration of Truths ==
On June 10, 2019, Peta, along with cardinals Raymond Leo Burke and Jānis Pujats, in addition to Astana Auxiliary Bishop Athanasius Schneider and fellow Kazach archbishop Jan Paweł Lenga, published a 40-point "Declaration of Truths" claiming to reaffirm traditional Church teaching. The bishops wrote that such a declaration was necessary in a time of "almost universal doctrinal confusion and disorientation." Specific passages in the declaration implicitly relate to several writings by Pope Francis. The declaration states that "the religion born of faith in Jesus Christ" is the "only religion positively willed by God," seemingly alluding to the Document on Human Fraternity signed by Pope Francis on February 4, which stated that the "diversity of religions" is "willed by God." Following recent changes to the Catechism to oppose capital punishment, the declaration states that the Church "did not err" in teaching that civil authorities may "lawfully exercise capital punishment" when it is "truly necessary" and to preserve the "just order of societies."

== Call for Peace ==
On January 10, 2022, during a Day of Mourning following weeks of civil unrest, Peta issued a call for peace. Lamenting the nearly 200 deaths caused by the violence, he instructed his priests to celebrate mass on January 13 and "to pray for victims and peace in our beloved Kazakhstan. The archbishop himself celebrated mass for that intention in the cathedral, and said "On Sunday, after the Angelus prayer, Pope Francis spoke about the incidents in Kazakhstan. He entrusted Kazakhstan to the protection of Our Lady Queen of Peace of Oziornoje. Following the Pope's appeal, we also want to ask for peace through the intercession of the patroness of our country, the Queen of Peace."
