= Apostolic administration =

Administrative division used in the Catholic Church

An apostolic administration in the Catholic Church is administrated by a prelate appointed by the Pope to serve as the ordinary for a specific area. Either the area is not yet a diocese (a stable 'pre-diocesan', usually missionary apostolic administration), or is a diocese, archdiocese, eparchy or similar permanent ordinariate (such as a territorial prelature or a territorial abbacy) that has no mainstay prelate (an apostolic administrator sede vacante, as after an episcopal death, resignation or transfer to another territory) or, in very rare cases, has an incapacitated head (apostolic administrator sede plena). The title also applies to an outgoing incumbent while awaiting for the date of assuming his new position or date of effectivity of a retirement.

== Characteristics ==
Apostolic administrators of stable administrations are equivalent in canon law with diocesan bishops and archbishops and so they have essentially the same authority as such. This type of apostolic administrator is usually the prelate of a titular see. As apostolic administrator are already a prelate, they are able to add clergy to a vacant see through ordination to diaconate or priesthood of an individual and perform mass involving blessing of oils during Holy Thursday, unlike locally appointed diocesan administrator, but are not able to use the cathedra as it is a symbol of office of a mainstay prelate and instead use a regular chair reserved for the main celebrant when they preside.

Administrators sede vacante or sede plena serve in their role only until a successor prelate takes possession of the diocese and archdiocese. They are restricted by canon law in what they may do to the territory that they temporarily administer, such as an administrator may not sell its real estate. That type of administrator is commonly an auxiliary bishop and a priest serving as the vicar general of the diocese or the ordinary of a neighboring diocese.

Normally, when a Catholic local territory falls vacant, the previously-appointed coadjutor bishop takes possession of the see, or (a successor is not yet installed or assumed office) a vicar capitular or diocesan administrator is chosen locally. However, the Pope, the head of the Catholic Church, may decide to name an administrator himself instead, of waiting for the diocesan or archdiocesan college of consultors to appoint its local administrator, and it is then called an apostolic administrator. Sometimes, a retiring, promoted or transferred prelate is designated to be apostolic administrator until his successor is installed, or the metropolitan or a fellow suffragan is appointed.

== Apostolic administrations ==
In March 2021, there were the following stable apostolic administrations, most of which were administered by a (titular or external) bishop, are of the Roman Rite and are in former or current communist countries:

- Apostolic Administration of Atyrau, in Kazakhstan, suffragan of the Metropolitan Archbishopric of Astana
- Apostolic Administration of the Caucasus, immediately subject to the Holy See, established in 1991 for two predominantly-Orthodox former Soviet Republics: Georgia (the cathedral is in its capital, Tbilisi) and Armenia
- Apostolic Administration of Harbin in the People's Republic of China, immediately subject to the Holy See, established in 1935, with a cathedral and a bishop without papal mandate since 2012, recognized by the Holy See in 2018
- Apostolic Administration of Kinmen-Matsu, immediately subject to the Holy See, established in 1968 for Fuchien Province (Kinmen and Matsu Islands) of the Republic of China (Taiwan)
- Apostolic Administration of Kyrgyzstan, immediately subject to the Holy See, founded in 1997 as a mission sui juris to this mainly-Islamic former Soviet Republic in Central Asia and promoted in 2006
- Apostolic Administration of Uzbekistan, immediately subject to Rome, founded in 1997 as a mission sui juris to this predominantly-Islamic former Soviet Republic in Central Asia, and promoted in 2005.

The following apostolic administration has jurisdiction only over Catholics of the Byzantine Rite, which does not have its own jurisdiction in the countries concerned:

- Apostolic Administration of Kazakhstan and Central Asia for Faithful of Byzantine Rite, with a see in Karaganda, for Kazakhstan, Kyrgyzstan, Tajikistan, Turkmenistan and Uzbekistan.

The following apostolic administration has jurisdiction over Catholics of the Latin Rite and those of other rites, which do not have their own jurisdictions in the area concerned:

- Apostolic Administration of Southern Albania, with pro-cathedral see at Vlorë, established in 1939 for all Catholics in southern regions of Albania, of the Latin and the Byzantine Rites, since 2005 is suffragan of the Metropolitan of Tirana–Durrës.

=== Jurisdictions in North Korea ===
The Diocese of Pyongyang, North Korea: its last bishop, Francis Hong Yong-ho, was imprisoned by the communist government of Kim Il Sung in 1949 and later disappeared. The Metropolitan Archbishop of Seoul, in South Korea, acts as the apostolic administrator for Pyongyang, as religion is suppressed in North Korea.

The Diocese of Hamhung and the Territorial Abbey of Tokwon: their last ordinary, the abbot Boniface Sauer, was imprisoned in 1949 and died 1950 in prison. The Bishop of Chuncheon currently acts as the apostolic administrator of Hanhung, and the Abbot of Waegwan Abbey acts as the apostolic administrator of Tokwon.

== Personal Apostolic Administration of Saint John Mary Vianney ==
In addition, the Personal Apostolic Administration of Saint John Mary Vianney is a non-territorial jurisdiction, similar to a personal prelature; it is exempt, immediately subject to the Holy See and not part of any ecclesiastical province. It is a separate particular church for traditionalist Catholics within the Diocese of Campos, in Brazil, a suffragan of the Metropolitan Archdiocese of Niterói.

The personal apostolic administration was formed by Pope John Paul II to minister to a group of traditionalist Catholic priests that uses the Tridentine Mass. The group had been formed by Bishop Antônio de Castro Mayer and been associated with the Society of St. Pius X of Archbishop Marcel Lefebvre before they reconciled with Rome on January 18, 2002.

== Outgoing bishops ==
While awaiting for the date of assuming his new position or installation, the outgoing prelate still serve as bishop or archbishop of a diocese or an archdiocese and at the same time act as the apostolic administrator of a territory that he currently leads from the time of announcement or appointment to that either of assuming into his new position or effective date of the retirement.

== Temporary administration of vacant sees ==
It is fairly typical that the pope can decide to name an administrator himself to a diocese or archdiocese that lacks an ordinary (bishop or archbishop). He then calls as apostolic administrator acting as temporary bishop or archbishop duties and responsibilities-wise, instead of waiting for the college of consultors to appoint a diocesan or archdiocesan administrator. Usually, the emeritus bishop or auxiliary bishop is appointed in such a case. If the appointed apostolic administrator is a diocesan bishop or archbishop of a diocese or archdiocese, he governs two Catholic territories, which are his own and the vacant one, the latter being temporarily while a successor of a vacant diocese is not yet became a bishop or archbishop of a particular territory. In 2013 and exceptionally, the Archdiocese of Saint Andrews and Edinburgh had Philip Tartaglia under that procedure.

For example, Luis Antonio Tagle, Archbishop of Manila ended his tenure as the archdiocese's archbishop when he became Prefect of the Congregation for the Evangelization of Peoples on 9 February 2020. Broderick Soncuaco Pabillo, Auxiliary Bishop of Manila, was then appointed as apostolic administrator until Cardinal Jose Advincula became Tagle's successor as archbishop on 24 June 2021.

Ruperto Cruz Santos, the fourth Bishop of Balanga in Bataan and Socrates Buenaventura Villegas's successor from 1 April 2010 to 22 July 2023 and installed into office on 8 July 2010 (4,860 days), ended his tenure as the diocese's bishop when he became fifth Bishop of Antipolo, with jurisdiction over Marikina, in Metro Manila, and the province of Rizal upon his installation on 22 July 2023 to succeed Francisco Mendoza de Leon, who retired as bishop at the said date of July 2023. Florentino Galang Lavarias, Archbishop of San Fernando, Pampanga since 27 October 2014, was then appointed as apostolic administrator who served on that position until Santos' successor Rufino Sescon became fifth bishop on 1 March 2025. Honesto Flores Ongtioco, the second Bishop of Balanga, from 18 June 1998 to 28 August 2003, succeeded Celso Nogoy Guevarra and Bishop of Cubao in Quezon City from 28 August 2003 to 3 December 2024, served the same position at Roman Catholic Diocese of Malolos, which covers the province of Bulacan and the city of Valenzuela from 16 May 2018 to 21 August 2019 because of the death of Jose Francisco Oliveros, who served as its fourth bishop from 5 August 2004 to 11 May 2018.

Michael Yeung Ming-cheung, the Bishop of Hong Kong, died on 3 January 2019. Cardinal John Tong Hon, a bishop emeritus, was then appointed as apostolic administrator.

The Pope may to appoint an apostolic administrator sede plena, as a temporary replacement. Anthony Sablan Apuron, the Archbishop of Agaña, was under investigation for sexual abuse in June 2016, and Pope Francis then appointed Savio Hon Tai-fai as apostolic administrator sede plena. On 31 October 2016, Michael J. Byrnes, Auxiliary Bishop of Detroit, was appointed Coadjutor Archbishop of Agaña with full administrative authority and later succeeded as archbishop.

== Former apostolic administrations ==
=== Latin in Europe ===
- Apostolic Administration of Český Těšín (Czech Republic)
- Apostolic Administration of Drohiczyn (Poland; promoted to Diocese of Drohiczyn)
- Apostolic Administration of the Free City of Danzig (Free City of Danzig, currently Poland; promoted to Diocese of Danzig, later renamed Diocese of Gdańsk and finally promoted to Archdiocese of Gdańsk)
- Apostolic Administration of Eastern Siberia (Russia)
- Apostolic Administration of Estonia established in 1924, on September 26, 2024 the Vatican announced that it had raised the apostolic administration of Tallinn to the level of diocese.
- Apostolic Administration of Eupen–Malmedy–Sankt Vith (Belgium; promoted to Diocese of Eupen–Malmedy, later suppressed into Liège diocese)
- Apostolic Administration of European Russia
- Apostolic Administration of Görlitz (Germany; promoted to a Diocese)
- Apostolic Administration of Haarlem (Netherlands; promoted to a Diocese, renamed Haarlem–Amsterdam)
- Apostolic Administration of Kamień, Lubusz and the Prelature of Piła with see in Gorzów Wielkopolski (Poland; dissolved 1972 and split into 3 parts, promoted: Diocese of Gorzów, renamed in 1992 Zielona Góra-Gorzów, Diocese of Szczecin-Kamień, later promoted Archdiocese, and Diocese of Koszalin-Kołobrzeg, with small easternmost fragment transferred to Diocese of Chełmno)
- Apostolic Administration of Lubaczów (promoted and renamed Diocese of Zamość-Lubaczów, Poland)
- Apostolic Administration of Moldova (Moldavia; now Diocese of Chisinau)
- Apostolic Administration of Northern European Russia
- Apostolic Administration of Novosibirsk (Russia)
- Apostolic Administration of Opole (Poland; promoted to a Diocese)
- Apostolic Administration of Prizren, a former diocese (and later titular bishopric) in Kosovo (in 1969 absorbed by Skopje in the present North Macedonia), restored in 2000, elevated in 2018 as a diocese, immediately subject to the Holy See
- Apostolic administration of Schwerin (partitioned Germany, merged into Hamburg archbishopric)
- Apostolic Administration of Southern European Russia
- Apostolic Administration of Trnava (Slovakia; promoted Archdiocese, lost Metropolitan status when restored after merger into Bratislava)
- Apostolic Administration of Tütz (then Germany, currently Poland; see moved to Schneidemühl (now Piła), elevated to Territorial Prelature of Schneidemühl, later made part of the Apostolic Administration of Kamień, Lubusz and the Prelature of Piła)
- Apostolic Administration of Upper Silesia (Poland; now Archdiocese of Katowice)
- Apostolic Administration of Western Siberia (Russia)
- Apostolic Administration of West Flanders (Dutch: West-Vlaanderen), province in Belgium; promoted diocese and renamed Bruges (Brugge) after its see)
- Apostolic Administration of Yugoslav Bačka (Serbia; now Diocese of Subotica)
- Apostolic Administration of Yugoslav Banat (Serbia; now Diocese of Zrenjanin)
- Archdiocese of Białystok (Poland; formerly an Apostolic administration as part of Archdiocese of Vilnius, Lithuania)

=== Eastern Catholic in Europe ===
- Apostolic Administration of Lemkowszczyzna (Poland; Ukrainian Catholic, promoted Apostolic Exarchate, suppressed)
- Ruthenian Catholic Apostolic Administration of Bosnia-Hercegovina (Bosnia and Herzegovina, Byzantine Rite; suppressed)
- Ruthenian Catholic Apostolic Administration of Targul-Siret (Romania, Byzantine Rite; suppressed)

=== Latin Overseas ===
==== In Asia ====
- Apostolic Administration of Almaty (Kazachstan; promoted to a Diocese)
- Apostolic Administration of Astana (Kazachstan; promoted to an Archdiocese)
- Apostolic Administration of Kazakhstan (promoted to a Diocese and renamed Karaganda after its see)
- Apostolic Administration of Latakia (Maronite, Syria; now an Eparchy: Eastern Catholic Diocese)
- Apostolic Administration of Okinawa and the Southern Islands, alias Ryukyus (Japan; now Diocese of Naha)

==== In America ====
- Apostolic Administration of Copiapó (Chile; now a diocese)
- Apostolic Administration of El Petén (Guatemala; promoted to an Apostolic Vicariate)
- Apostolic Administration of Izabal (Guatemala; now a diocese)
- Apostolic Administration of Rio Branco (Brazil; promoted Territorial Prelature, renamed and again promoted to Diocese of Roraima)

==== In Africa ====
- Apostolic Administration of the Comoros Archipelago (Comoros; now Apostolic Vicariate of the Comoros Archipelago)
- Apostolic Administration of Mbuji-Mayi (now Diocese of Mbujimayi, in Congo)
- Apostolic Administration of Zanzibar and Pemba (now Diocese of Zanzibar, in Tanzania)

== See also ==
- List of Catholic dioceses (alphabetical)
- List of Catholic dioceses (structured view)
- List of Catholic archdioceses
- List of Military Ordinariates or Catholic military bishoprics
- List of Catholic apostolic vicariates
- List of Eastern Catholic (Apostolic, Patriarchal and other) Exarchates
- List of Apostolic Prefectures
- List of Territorial Prelatures
- List of Catholic Missions sui juris
- Reorganization of occupied dioceses during World War II
