= 2022 in religion =

This is a timeline of events during the year 2022 which relate to religion.

== Events ==
- 15 January – A hostage crisis occurs at a synagogue in Colleyville, Texas.
- 5 February – The government of Karnataka, India upholds a hijab ban at schools.
- March – Hundreds of Eastern Orthodox clergymen sign the Volos Declaration against the Russian invasion of Ukraine.
- 4 March – A member of the Islamic State – Khorasan Province carries out a bombing of a Shiite mosque in Peshawar, Pakistan.
- 15 March – The United Nations sets 15 March as the International Day To Combat Islamophobia.
- 19 March – Pope Francis publishes and promulgates the Praedicate evangelium.
- April – The Bishops' Conference of Central Asia is established and selects José Luís Mumbiela Sierra as its first president.
- 15 April – Riots break out in Sweden after a far-right group announces its plan to burn a Quran.
- 24 April – The 500 Years of Christianity in the Philippines celebrations conclude.
- 26 April – Gunmen attack a mosque in Gondar, Ethiopia.
- 1 May – The Global Methodist Church is established to split from the United Methodist Church in opposition to its tolerance of LGBT practitioners.
- 27 May – Indian politician Nupur Sharma accuses Muhammad of pedophilia, causing widespread protests.
- 5 June – The Praedicate evangelium takes effect in the Catholic Church.
- 21 June – The Je Khenpo of Bhutan ordains 144 bhikkhunīs, allowing full ordainment for women in Bhutanese Tibetan Buddhism.
- 27 June – The Supreme Court of the United States determines that the Free Exercise Clause allows instructors to incorporate prayer into school activities in Kennedy v. Bremerton School District.
- 1 July – The Ibn Rushd-Goethe Mosque became the first mosque in Germany to raise a rainbow flag.
- 4 July – The St. Nicholas Greek Orthodox Church is consecrated in New York City to replace the church that was destroyed during the September 11 attacks.
- 24 July – Pope Francis visits Canada and apologizes for the church's historical involvement in the Canadian Indian residential school system.
- 16 August – The Anglican Church of Australia splits: Conservatives form an Australian breakaway church Diocese of the Southern Cross. It is to be led by former Archbishop of Sydney Glenn Davies. The split was caused by the differing positions on same sex marriage among other issues.
- 14 September – The 7th Congress of Leaders of World and Traditional Religions begins in Nur-Sultan, Kazakhstan.
- 18 December – An election takes place to choose the Archbishop of the Church of Cyprus.
- 31 December – Pope Benedict XVI, who served from 2005 to 2013 as head of the Catholic Church, dies at age 95.

== See also ==
- 2022 in Vatican City
- Religion and the Russian invasion of Ukraine
