= Federation of Asian Bishops' Conferences =

Association of Catholic episcopal conferences in Asia

- Abbreviation: FABC
- Formation: 1970
- Legal status: Civil nonprofit
- Region served: Asia
- Members: Episcopal conferences of Asia
- Main organ: Conference
- Website: www.fabc.org

The Federation of Asian Bishops' Conferences (FABC) is an association of episcopal conferences of Catholic Church in South, Southeast, East and Central Asia. The federation fosters solidarity and joint responsibility for the welfare of the Church and of society in the region.

The conference includes sixteen (or nineteen) Bishops' Conferences from Bangladesh, India (both the CBCI and the individual conferences of the Syro-Malabar, Syro-Malankara and Roman Rites), Indonesia, Japan, Korea, Laos–Cambodia, Malaysia-Singapore-Brunei, Myanmar, Pakistan, Philippines, Sri Lanka, Taiwan (RoC), Thailand, Timor-Leste and Vietnam and collective Bishops' Conference of Central Asia. Associate members are from Hong Kong, Macau, Mongolia, Nepal, Novosibirsk (Russia).

Founded in 1970, the FABC was due to mark its 50th anniversary in 2020, but the celebration was postponed due to the COVID-19 pandemic. Instead, the 50th anniversary of the FABC was celebrated at Baan Phu Wan Pastoral Center, Archdiocese of Bangkok, Thailand, on October 12, 2022.

== Member Bishops' Conferences ==
Map of Bishops' Conferences in FABC

=== Full members ===
- Catholic Bishops' Conference of Bangladesh
- Catholic Bishops' Conference of India
  - Conference of Catholic Bishops of India
  - Syro-Malabar Bishops' Synod
  - Holy Episcopal Synod of the Syro-Malankara Catholic Church
- Bishops' Conference of Indonesia
- Catholic Bishops' Conference of Japan
- Bishops' Conference of Central Asia
- Catholic Bishops' Conference of Korea
- Catholic Bishops' Conference of Laos and Cambodia
- Catholic Bishops' Conference of Malaysia, Singapore and Brunei
- Catholic Bishops' Conference of Myanmar
- Catholic Bishops' Conference of Pakistan
- Catholic Bishops' Conference of the Philippines
- Catholic Bishops' Conference of Sri Lanka
- Chinese Regional Bishops' Conference of Taiwan
- Catholic Bishops' Conference of Thailand
- Episcopal Conference of Timor-Leste
- Catholic Bishops' Conference of Vietnam
- Episcopal Conference of China
- Episcopal Conference of Nepal
- Episcopal Conference of Mongolia

=== Associate members ===
- Diocese of Hong Kong
- Diocese of Macau
- Apostolic Prefecture of Ulaanbaatar (Mongolia)
- Apostolic Vicariate of Nepal

=== Former members ===
- Bishops' Conference of Kazakhstan (until 2022)

== Presidents ==
- Cardinal Stephen Kim Sou-hwan, Archbishop of Seoul, South Korea (1973 – 1977)
- Mariano Gaviola y Garcés, Archbishop of Lipa, Philippines (1977–1984)
- Henry Sebastian D'Souza, Archbishop of Calcutta, India (1984–1993)
- Oscar Cruz, Archbishop of Lingayen-Dagupan, Philippines (1993–2000)
- Oswald Gomis, Archbishop of Colombo, Sri Lanka (2000–2005)
- Cardinal Orlando Quevedo, Archbishop of Cotabato, Philippines (2005 – 2011)
- Cardinal Oswald Gracias, Archbishop of Bombay, India (2011 – 2018)
- Cardinal Charles Maung Bo, Archbishop of Yangon, Myanmar (2019 - 2023)
- Cardinal Filipe Neri Ferrão, Roman Catholic Archdiocese of Goa and Daman (2024-2025)

== Asian Youth Day ==
Asian Youth Day was started in 1999 under the auspices of the federation.
AYD 1 - 1999, Hua Hin, Thailand, “Asian Youth Journeying with Jesus Towards the Third Millenium”
AYD 2 - 2001, Taipei, Taiwan, “We are Called to Sanctity and Solidarity”
AYD 3 - 2003, Bangalore, India, “Asian Youth for Peace”
AYD 4 - 2006, Hong Kong, “Youth, Hope of Asian Families”
AYD 5 - 2009, Imus, Philippines, “YAsia Fiesta! Young Asians: Come Together, Share the Word, Live the Eucharist”
AYD 6 - 2014, Daejeon, Korea, “Asian Youth, Wake Up! The Glory of the Martyrs Shines on You”
AYD 7 - 2017, Yogyakarta, Indonesia, “Joyful Asian Youth! Living the Gospel in Multicultural Asia”

== See also ==
- Catholic Church in Asia
- List of Catholic dioceses of Asia
