= Piotr Pytlowany =

Polish-born Kazakhstani Roman Catholic bishop (born 1969)

The Most Reverend Piotr Pytlowany
- Bishop of Karaganda
- Church: Catholic Church
- Diocese: Karaganda
- Appointed: 10 August 2026
- Predecessor: Adelio Dell'Oro

Orders
- Ordination: 28 May 1994 by Józef Michalik
- Consecration: 10 October 2026 by Tomasz Peta

Personal details
- Born: 7 May 1969 (age 57) Brzozów, Poland
- Education: John Paul II Catholic University of Lublin; Pontifical University of John Paul II

Piotr Pytlowany (born 7 May 1969) is a Polish-born Kazakhstani Roman Catholic prelate who has served as Bishop of Karaganda since 2026.

== Early life and education ==
Pytlowany was born on 7 May 1969 in Brzozów, Poland. After completing primary and secondary education, he entered the Major Seminary in Przemyśl. On 28 April 1994, he received a bachelor's degree from the John Paul II Catholic University of Lublin. He was ordained a priest on 28 May 1994 and incardinated into the Archdiocese of Przemyśl.

He subsequently studied at the Pontifical University of John Paul II in Kraków, where he obtained a doctorate in theology in 2018.

== Priestly ministry ==
Following his ordination, Pytlowany served as a parochial vicar at the parish of the Holy Trinity in Leżajsk from 1994 to 1995. In 1995, he began pastoral ministry in Kazakhstan as a fidei donum priest. He served as parish priest of St Joseph's parish in Makinsk from 1995 to 2000 and of St Abraham's parish in Shchuchinsk from 2000 to 2001. During his service in Shchuchinsk, he organized the Fides et Ratio retreat centre.

From 2001 to 2007, Pytlowany was parish priest of the Cathedral of the Blessed Virgin Mary of Perpetual Help in Astana. He subsequently served at the Interdiocesan Higher Seminary in Karaganda, first as prefect from 2008 to 2009 and later as rector from 2011 until 2018.

In 2018, Pytlowany became spokesman for the Bishops' Conference of Kazakhstan. His work included establishing and organizing a media office and media centre. According to his missionary profile, the centre enabled the broadcasting of Masses, catechesis and conferences during the COVID-19 pandemic, reaching more than 200,000 people through its media ministry.

He served as parish priest of Our Lady of the Rosary in Akmol from 2023 to 2025, before returning in 2025 as parish priest of the Cathedral of the Blessed Virgin Mary of Perpetual Help in Astana. Vatican News described him at the time of his episcopal appointment as parish priest of the Astana cathedral and spokesman for the Conference of Bishops of Central Asia.

== Episcopate ==
On 10 August 2026, Pope Leo XIV accepted the resignation of Adelio Dell'Oro as Bishop of Karaganda and appointed Pytlowany as his successor. At the time of his appointment, Pytlowany was a priest of the Archdiocese of Przemyśl serving in Kazakhstan as a fidei donum priest.

His episcopal consecration was on 10 October 2026 at the Cathedral of Our Lady of Fatima in Karaganda.
