= Bishops' Conference of Central Asia =

Assembly of Catholic bishops

The Catholic Bishops' Conference of Central Asia is the episcopal conference of Kazakhstan, Kyrgyzstan and Uzbekistan, and also covering the Catholic structures of Tajikistan and Turkmenistan.

== History ==
In Kazakhstan from 2003 existed the Bishops' Conference of Kazakhstan, while in other Central Asian states existed only pre-diocesan jurisdictions.

On 8 September 2021 was established the new governing body – the Bishops' Conference of Central Asia by the Congregation for the Evangelization of Peoples, and Bishops' Conference of Kazakhstan become as a part of this new creation. The new Conference began to operate in April 2022.

== Structure of the Conference ==
The governing body was elected on 29 April 2022

President of the Conference: Bishop José Luís Mumbiela Sierra

Vice-president of the Conference: Bishop Jerzy Maculewicz, O.F.M.Conv.

General Secretary: Bishop Yevgeniy Zinkovskiy

== See also ==
- Christianity in Kazakhstan
- Catholic Church in Kazakhstan
- Catholic Church in Kyrgyzstan
- Catholic Church in Tajikistan
- Catholic Church in Turkmenistan
- Catholic Church in Uzbekistan
