= Bishops' Conference of Kazakhstan =

The Catholic Bishops' Conference of Kazakhstan was the episcopal conference of Kazakhstan, that operated from 2003 until 2022. It consisted of Archdiocese, two dioceses, and apostolic administration.

== History ==
On 7 July 1999, Pope John Paul II establishes a new administrative division of the territory of the Republic of Kazakhstan. Thus, a diocese was formed in Karaganda, which was directly subordinate to the Vatican, and three Apostolic Administrations in Astana, Almaty, and Atyrau. On 17 May 2003, the Apostolic Administration in Astana was elevated to the Archdiocese and the Apostolic Administration in Almaty was elevated to the rank of a diocese. The Conference of Catholic Bishops of the Republic of Kazakhstan was established in 2003. The plenary sessions of the Conference are held twice a year. One of the bishops is elected chairman of the conference for a three-year term, who can hold this office for no more than two consecutive terms.

On 8 September 2021 was established the new governing body – the Bishops' Conference of Central Asia by the Congregation for the Evangelization of Peoples, and this Conference become as a part of this new creation. It ceased to operate in April 2022, when the new Conference began to work.

== Structure of the Conference ==
- Structure of the Conference of Catholic Bishops of the Republic of Kazakhstan

Chairman of the KCEC: Bishop Jose Luis Mumbiela Sierra

Secretary General: Bishop Athanasius Schneider

- Conference composition:

Archbishop Tomasz Peta

Bishop Jose Luis Mumbiela Sierra

Bishop Adelio Del Oro

Bishop Athanasius Schneider

Priest Peter Sakmar

Press Secretary: Fr. Petr Pytlovani

== Dioceses and Bishops ==
Archdiocese of St. Mary in Astana

- Archbishop Tomasz Peta
- Bishop Athanasius Schneider, Auxiliary Bishop

Diocese of the Holy Trinity in Almaty

- Bishop Jose Luis Mumbiela Sierra

Diocese of Karaganda

- Bishop Adelio Del Oro

Atyrau Apostolic Administration

- Priest Peter Sakmar

== See also ==
- Christianity in Kazakhstan
- Catholic Church in Kazakhstan
- Apostolic Administration of Kazakhstan and Central Asia
