= Janusz Kaleta =

Polish Catholic bishop

- former Bishop of Karaganda
- Church: Catholic Church
- Diocese: Karaganda
- Appointed: 5 February 2011
- Predecessor: Jan Paul Lenga
- Successor: Adelio Dell’Oro
- Previous post: Apostolic Administrator of Atyrau (1999-2012)

Orders
- Ordination: 4 June 1989 by Jerzy Karol Ablewicz
- Consecration: 23 November 2006 by Angelo Sodano
- Laicized: 15 June 2016

Personal details
- Born: Janusz Wiesław Kaleta; October 11, 1964 (age 61) Łazy, Poland
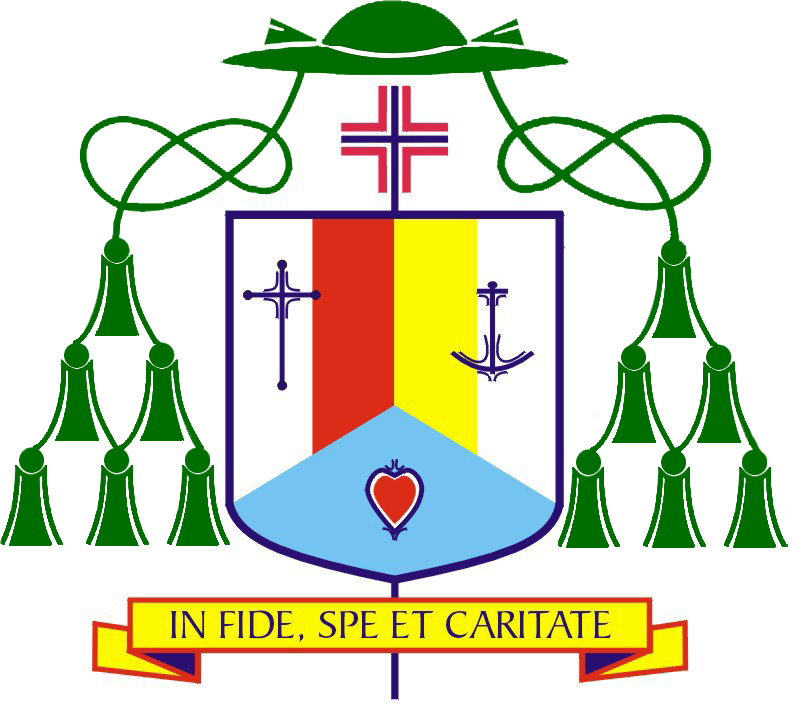
- Coat of arms

Janusz Wiesław Kaleta (born October 11, 1964, in Łazy, Poland) was a Catholic bishop who was laicized in 2016.

== Biography ==
Born in 1964, Kaleta was ordained a priest in 1989 in the Diocese of Tarnów. Since 7 July 1999 he was the Apostolic Administrator of Atyrau, Kazakhstan. On September 15, 2006, he was elevated to the episcopate by Pope Benedict XVI, who appointed him titular bishop.

Kaleta worked pastorally in Nowy Wiśnicz and Bochnia. After studying theology in Innsbruck in 1997 obtained a doctorate in moral theology, and his work devoted to issues of bioethics. In 1999 he moved to pastoral work in Kazakhstan. On July 7, 1999, John Paul II created the country's Apostolic Administration of Atyrau, the first with their manager was appointed Father Kaleta. This church subdivision includes western regions of Kazakhstan bordering the Caspian Sea. In an area of over 736,000 km^{2} (284,000 sq mi), more than twice the size of Poland, live more than 2.2 million people, including more than 2500 Catholics, with a large proportion of foreigners working in oil companies.

Consecrated on November 23, 2006, at St. Peter at the Vatican by Cardinal Secretary of State and retired dean of the College of Cardinals Angelo Sodano. Co-consecrating bishops were Bishop Wiktor Skworc and Bishop Henry Theophilus Howaniec, OFM. On February 5, 2011, Pope Benedict XVI appointed him bishop of Karaganda, while leaving him temporarily as an apostolic administrator of Atyrau.

He resigned as Bishop of Karaganda on July 15, 2014; at that time it was not clear whether this was due to his health problems, the management of the diocese or another reason. It was later known that monsignor Kaleta had a relationship with a woman and the couple had several embryos frozen. He was laicized June 15, 2016.
