= Demographics of Tajikistan =

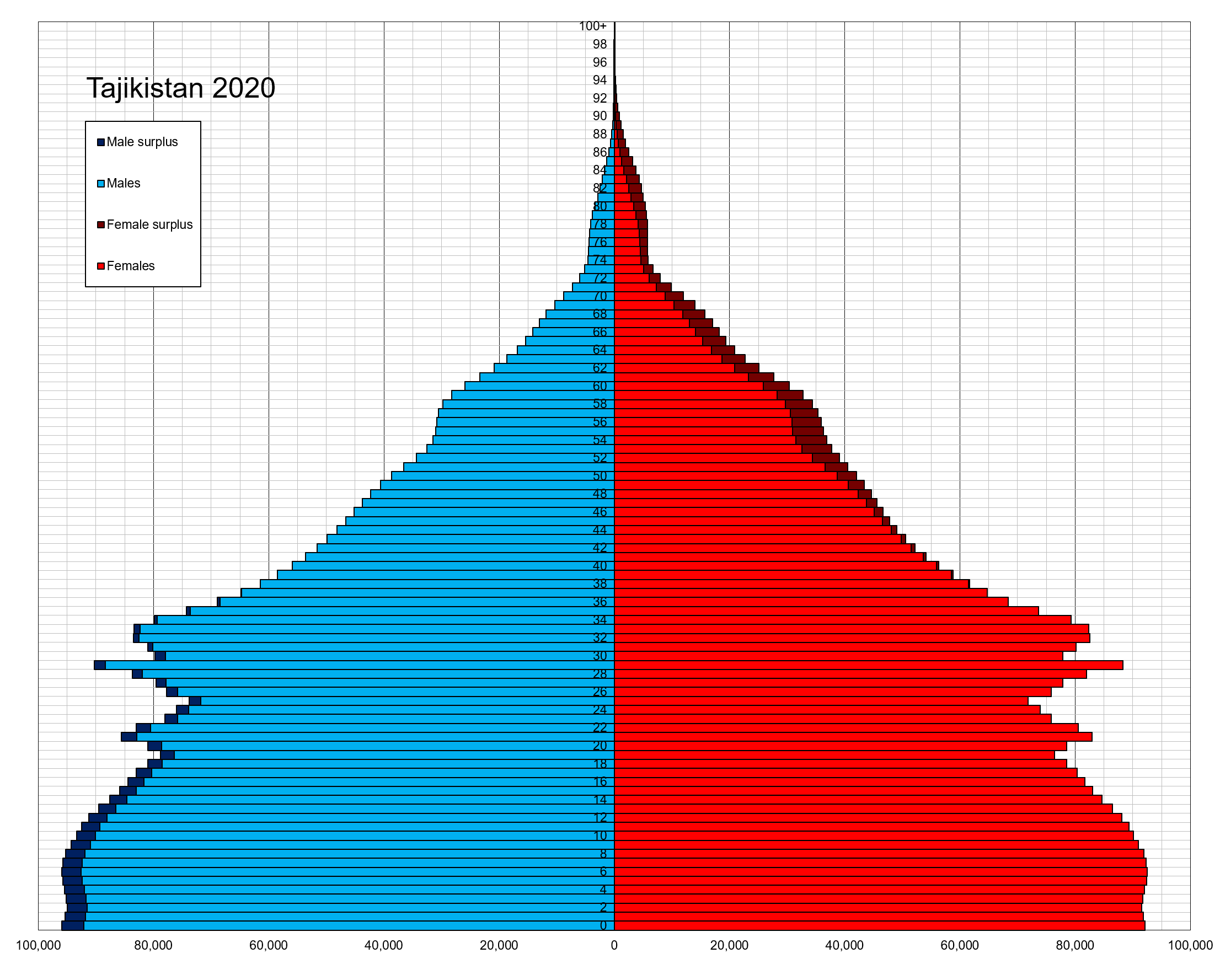
- Population pyramid of Tajikistan in 2020
- Population: 10,786,734 (2025)
- Growth rate: 1.4% (2022 est.)
- Birth rate: 20.73 births/1,000 population (2022 est.)
- Death rate: 5.72 deaths/1,000 population (2022 est.)
- Life expectancy: 71.43 years (2023 est.)
  - male: 66.2 years
  - female: 72.69 years (2022 est.)
- Fertility rate: ▲3.45 children born/woman (2023 est.)
- Infant mortality: 32.33 deaths/1,000 live births
- Net migration rate: -1.03 migrant(s)/1,000 population (2022 est.)

Age structure
- 0–14 years: 31.43%
- 65 and over: 3.63%

Sex ratio
- Total: 0.99 male(s)/female (2022 est.)
- At birth: 1.05 male(s)/female
- Under 15: 1.04 male(s)/female
- 65 and over: 0.48 male(s)/female

Nationality
- Nationality: Tajikistani(s)

Language
- Official: Tajik

The demographics of Tajikistan pertain to the demography of the population of Tajikistan, including population growth, population density, ethnicity, education level, health, economic status, religious affiliations, and other aspects of the population.

== Population size and structure ==
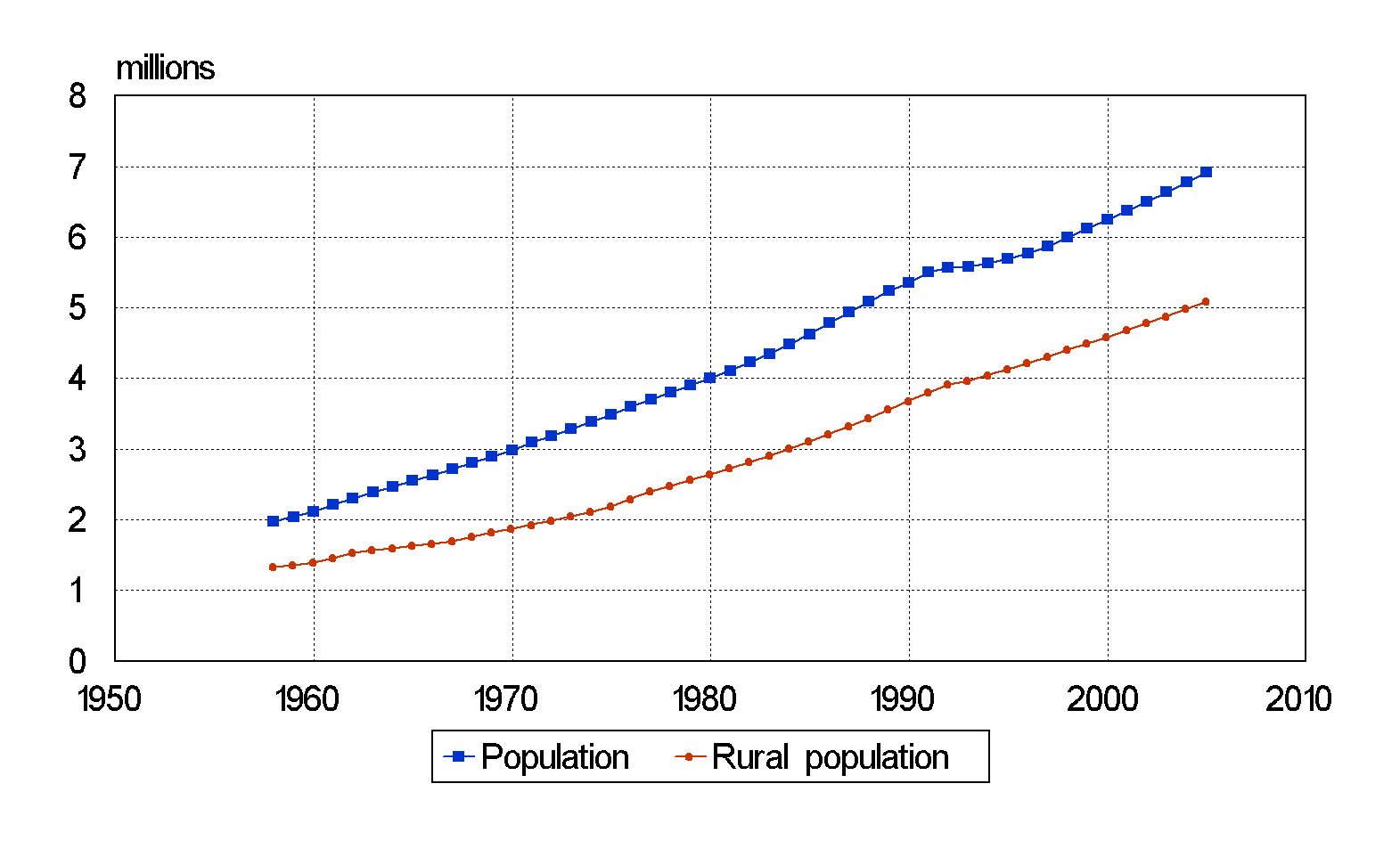
Tajikistan's population and rural population 1958–2005 (millions).

10,786,734 (2025 est.) According to Worldmeters

Tajikistan's main ethnic group is the Tajiks, with minorities such as the Uzbeks and Kyrgyz, and a small Russian minority. Because not everyone in Tajikistan is an ethnic Tajik, the non-Tajik citizens of the country are referred to as Tajikistani. The official nationality of any person from Tajikistan is Tajikistani, while the ethnic Tajik majority simply call themselves Tajik.

Contemporary Tajiks are an Iranian people. In particular, they are descended from ancient Eastern Iranian peoples of Central Asia, such as the Soghdians and the Bactrians, with an admixture of Western Iranian Persians, as well as non-Iranian peoples.

Until the 20th century, people in the region used two types of distinction to identify themselves: way of life—either nomadic or sedentary—and place of residence. By the late nineteenth century, the Tajik and Uzbek peoples, who had lived in proximity for centuries and often used each other's languages, did not perceive themselves as two distinct nationalities. The modern labels were imposed artificially when Central Asia was divided into five Soviet republics in the 1920s.

Historically, Tajikistan and Uzbekistan were also home to Bukharan Jews, who trace their ancestry to the Lost Tribes of Israel taken captive by the Babylonians in the 7th century BC, but almost no Bukharian Jews are left in Tajikistan.

=== Age structure ===
Population Estimates by Sex and Age Group (01.VII.2012)

Age group	Male	Female	Total	%
Total	3 987 517	3 909 796	7 897 313	100
0–4	555 543	522 110	1 077 653	13.65
5–9	437 711	414 701	852 412	10.79
10–14	440 884	419 105	859 989	10.89
15–19	436 357	420 499	856 856	10.85
20–24	429 738	424 831	854 569	10.82
25–29	363 432	358 886	722 318	9.15
30–34	271 966	265 850	537 816	6.81
35–39	225 366	227 780	453 146	5.74
40–44	202 816	208 317	411 132	5.21
45–49	181 790	189 145	370 934	4.70
50–54	156 158	160 512	316 669	4.01
55–59	100 176	104 798	204 974	2.60
60–64	64 192	67 836	132 028	1.67
65–69	36 014	33 300	69 314	0.88
70–74	38 813	38 360	77 172	0.98
75–79	24 913	28 119	53 032	0.67
80–84	14 691	16 110	30 801	0.39
85–89	5 432	6 682	12 114	0.15
90–94	1 211	2 114	3 324	0.04
95–99	268	491	758	0.01
100+	52	257	309	<0.01
Age group	Male	Female	Total	Percent
0–14	1 434 138	1 355 916	2 790 054	35.33
15–64	2 431 985	2 428 447	4 860 432	61.55
65+	121 394	125 433	246 827	3.13

Population Estimates by Sex and Age Group (01.VII.2013)

Age group	Male	Female	Total	%
Total	4 078 857	3 995 409	8 074 266	100
0–4	564 736	528 451	1 093 187	13.54
5–9	453 224	428 754	881 978	10.92
10–14	437 293	415 432	852 725	10.56
15–19	440 389	422 520	862 909	10.69
20–24	428 230	422 055	850 284	10.53
25–29	382 376	379 040	761 416	9.43
30–34	286 675	279 681	566 356	7.01
35–39	230 478	231 505	461 983	5.72
40–44	206 328	211 812	418 139	5.18
45–49	184 234	191 988	376 222	4.66
50–54	163 910	168 577	332 487	4.12
55–59	108 532	113 347	221 879	2.75
60–64	69 788	74 346	144 133	1.79
65–69	37 799	36 790	74 589	0.92
70–74	37 495	36 388	73 883	0.92
75–79	25 173	28 084	53 256	0.66
80–84	14 482	16 838	31 319	0.39
85–89	6 091	7 046	13 136	0.16
90–94	1 301	2 108	3 408	0.04
95–99	262	434	696	0.01
100+	69	218	287	<0.01
Age group	Male	Female	Total	Percent
0–14	1 455 253	1 372 637	2 827 890	35.02
15–64	2 500 932	2 494 866	4 995 798	61.87
65+	122 672	127 906	250 578	3.10

Population Estimates by Sex and Age Group (01.VII.2020):

Age group	Male	Female	Total	%
Total	4 724 044	4 589 723	9 313 767	100
0–4	604 646	538 522	1 143 168	12.27
5–9	572 947	528 515	1 101 462	11.83
10–14	486 486	459 827	946 313	10.16
15–19	430 596	408 418	839 014	9.01
20–24	433 864	421 271	855 135	9.18
25–29	427 540	419 755	847 295	9.10
30–34	398 523	400 106	798 629	8.57
35–39	304 697	298 972	603 669	6.48
40–44	237 475	237 835	475 310	5.10
45–49	208 346	214 686	423 032	4.54
50–54	183 206	192 067	375 273	4.03
55–59	166 874	175 280	342 154	3.67
60–64	114 298	121 451	235 749	2.53
65–69	70 002	76 881	146 883	1.58
70–74	35 648	38 794	74 442	0.80
75–79	24 460	25 412	49 872	0.54
80–84	14 826	18 668	33 494	0.36
85–89	6 462	9 532	15 994	0.17
90–94	2 337	2 337	4 930	0.05
95–99	741	1 088	1 829	0.02
100+	70	50	120	<0.01
Age group	Male	Female	Total	Percent
0–14	1 664 079	1 526 864	3 190 943	34.26
15–64	2 905 419	2 889 841	5 795 260	62.22
65+	154 546	173 018	327 564	3.52

View source data.
View source data.
View source data.
View source data.

== Vital statistics ==
=== UN estimates ===
Period	Live births per year	Deaths per year	Natural change per year	CBR^{1}	CDR^{1}	NC^{1}	TFR^{1}	IMR^{1}
1950–1955	74 000	20 000	54 000	42.7	15.4	27.3	5.40	
1955–1960	89 000	26 000	63 000	47.9	15.8	32.1	6.20	
1960–1965	111 000	30 000	81 000	47.9	14.7	33.2	6.80	
1965–1970	110 000	30 000	80 000	43.6	12.8	30.8	7.00	
1970–1975	127 000	30 000	97 000	41.5	11.6	29.9	6.83	
1975–1980	138 000	33 000	105 000	39.7	10.5	29.2	5.90	
1980–1985	164 000	34 000	130 000	42.0	10.2	31.8	5.60	
1985–1990	198 000	34 000	164 000	42.8	9.7	33.1	5.50	
1990–1995	206 000	52 000	154 000	37.4	9.6	27.8	4.88	
1995–2000	195 000	49 000	146 000	32.7	7.8	24.9	4.29	
2000–2005	185 000	45 000	140 000	28.5	6.4	22.1	3.60	
2005–2010	187 000	43 000	144 000	29.5	5.7	23.8	3.50	
2010–2015				30.2	5.3	24.9	3.50	
2015–2020				27.9	5.1	22.8	3.28	
2020–2025				24.9	5.0	19.9	3.09	
2025–2030				22.4	5.1	17.3	2.93	
2030–2035				21.3	5.3	16.0	2.79	
2035–2040				20.9	5.6	15.3	2.66	
^{1} CBR = crude birth rate (per 1000); CDR = crude death rate (per 1000); NC = natural change (per 1000); TFR = total fertility rate (number of children per woman); IMR = infant mortality rate per 1000 births

=== Registered births and deaths ===
	Average population	Live births	Deaths	Natural change	Crude birth rate (per 1000)	Crude death rate (per 1000)	Natural change rate (per 1000)	Crude migration rate (per 1000)	Total fertility rate
1950	1,526,140	46,571	12,543	34,028	30.4	8.2	22.2		
1951	1,582,465	48,407	12,384	36,023	30.5	7.8	22.7	14.2	
1952	1,637,708	54,931	12,562	42,369	33.4	7.6	25.8	9.1	
1953	1,692,875	54,697	14,530	40,167	32.4	8.6	23.8	9.9	
1954	1,748,475	56,946	13,045	43,901	32.9	7.5	25.4	7.4	
1955	1,805,209	60,335	15,812	44,523	33.8	8.9	25.0	7.4	
1956	1,863,791	62,960	10,894	52,066	34.2	5.9	28.3	4.2	
1957	1,924,944	62,966	10,838	52,128	33.1	5.7	27.4	5.4	
1958	1,989,603	56,826	11,548	45,278	29.1	5.9	23.2	10.4	
1959	2,058,891	60,978	11,024	49,954	30.3	5.5	24.8	10.0	
1960	2,131,991	69,715	10,670	59,045	33.5	5.1	28.4	7.1	
1961	2,208,026	73,653	11,035	62,618	34.0	5.1	28.9	6.8	
1962	2,287,181	75,909	13,001	62,908	33.6	5.8	27.8	8.0	
1963	2,368,868	80,733	13,042	67,691	34.5	5.6	28.9	6.8	
1964	2,452,671	84,300	13,132	71,168	34.7	5.4	29.3	6.1	
1965	2,538,295	92,448	16,474	75,974	36.8	6.6	30.2	4.7	
1966	2,625,653	91,825	15,491	76,334	35.4	6.0	29.4	5.0	
1967	2,714,959	93,988	17,546	76,442	35.2	6.6	28.6	5.4	
1968	2,806,565	101,462	16,577	84,885	36.7	6.0	30.7	3.0	
1969	2,899,853	98,831	17,390	81,441	34.7	6.1	28.6	4.6	
1970	2,993,019	102,201	18,686	83,515	34.8	6.4	28.4	3.7	
1971	3,085,961	111,839	17,173	94,666	36.8	5.7	31.1	0	
1972	3,180,461	111,069	19,895	91,174	35.3	6.3	29.0	1.6	
1973	3,277,487	115,157	23,343	91,814	35.5	7.2	28.3	2.2	
1974	3,377,757	123,338	24,923	98,415	36.9	7.5	29.4	1.2	
1975	3,482,124	127,464	27,965	99,499	37.0	8.1	28.9	2.0	
1976	3,590,605	135,243	30,101	105,142	38.2	8.5	29.7	1.5	
1977	3,703,010	132,875	32,110	100,765	36.4	8.8	27.6	3.7	
1978	3,818,114	140,622	31,048	109,574	37.5	8.3	29.2	1.9	
1979	3,932,682	145,431	29,822	115,609	37.8	7.7	30.1	−0.1	
1980	4,045,965	146,422	31,830	114,592	37.0	8.0	29.0	−0.2	
1981	4,160,744	155,508	31,637	123,871	38.3	7.8	30.5	−2.1	
1982	4,278,908	159,571	32,053	127,518	38.2	7.7	30.5	−2.1	
1983	4,401,502	164,710	32,553	132,157	38.3	7.6	30.7	−2.0	
1984	4,529,500	176,197	32,872	143,325	39.8	7.4	32.4	−3.3	5.494
1985	4,660,598	182,716	32,014	150,702	40.0	7.0	33.0	−4.1	5.498
1986	4,798,281	198,647	31,993	166,654	42.1	6.8	35.3	−5.8	5.698
1987	4,946,293	204,450	33,543	170,907	41.9	6.9	35.0	−4.2	5.662
1988	5,100,019	201,864	35,334	166,530	40.2	7.0	33.2	−2.1	5.348
1989	5,264,331	200,430	33,395	167,035	38.7	6.5	32.3	−0.1	5.104
1990	5,417,860	205,813	33,020	172,793	38.8	6.2	32.6	−3.4	5.091
1991	5,556,305	215,269	33,584	181,685	39.1	6.1	33.0	−7.4	5.094
1992	5,656,207	180,377	36,718	143,634	32.4	6.6	25.8	−7.8	4.205
1993	5,717,805	186,920	49,326	137,261	33.5	8.9	24.6	−13.7	4.320
1994	5,803,992	191,596	39,943	151,653	34.2	7.1	27.0	−11.9	4.355
1995	5,916,173	193,182	34,274	158,908	34.1	6.0	28.0	−8.7	4.385
1996	6,035,599	172,341	31,792	140,549	30.0	5.5	24.5	−4.3	3.931
1997	6,117,068	178,127	28,710	149,417	30.6	4.9	25.7	−12.2	4.064
1998	6,156,804	185,733	27,397	158,336	31.3	4.6	26.7	−20.2	4.068
1999	6,189,564	180,888	25,495	155,393	29.8	4.2	25.6	−20.3	3.852
2000	6,272,998	167,246	29,387	137,859	27.0	4.7	22.3	−8.8	3.493
2001	6,408,809	171,623	32,015	139,608	27.2	5.1	22.1	−0.4	3.487
2002	6,541,754	175,599	31,142	144,457	27.3	4.8	22.4	−1.7	3.471
2003	6,672,491	177,938	33,185	144,753	27.1	5.1	22.0	−2.0	3.420
2004	6,801,204	179,563	29,741	149,822	26.8	4.4	22.3	−3.0	3.354
2005	6,929,144	180,790	31,520	149,270	26.4	4.6	21.8	−3.0	3.274
2006	7,057,416	186,463	31,990	154,473	26.7	4.6	22.1	−3.6	3.266
2007	7,188,390	200,010	33,686	166,324	28.1	4.7	23.3	−4.7	3.5
2008	7,324,627	203,332	31,996	171,336	27.9	4.4	23.5	−4.5	3.55
2009	7,468,595	199,826	32,332	167,504	26.8	4.3	22.5	−2.8	3.48
2010	7,621,779	218,065	32,635	185,430	29.4	4.4	25.0	−4.5	3.576
2011	7,784,818	226,652	33,958	192,693	28.7	4.3	24.4	−3.0	3.49
2012	7,956,381	219,281	33,972	185,309	27.8	4.3	23.5	−1.5	3.55
2013	8,136,610	209,417	31,706	177,711	25.9	3.9	22.0	0.7	3.54
2014	8,326,347	229,460	32,879	196,581	27.8	4.0	23.8	−0.5	3.87
2015	8,524,062	237,500	33,500	204,000	28.1	4.0	24.1	−0.4	4.00
2016	8,725,318	229,998	34,102	195,896	26.6	3.9	22.7	0.9	3.87
2017	8,925,525	226,852	32,152	194,700	25.4	3.6	21.7	1.2	3.61
2018	9,128,132	233,641	32,856	200,785	25.6	3.6	22.0	0.7	3.65
2019	9,337,003	234,383	33,537	200,846	25.4	3.6	21.8	1.1	3.69
2020	9,543,207	243,011	42,626	200,385	25.8	4.5	21.3	0.8	3.72
2021	9,750,064	206,501	39,112	167,389	22.1	4.0	18.1	3.6	3.75
2022	9,952,787	231,551	31,206	200,345	23.2	3.1	20.1	0.9	3.78
2023	10,159,805	250,285	32,397	217,888	24.6	3.2	21.4	−1.6	3.80
2024		251,553	33,022	218,531	24.2	3.2	21.0		3.10
2025		255,099	34,365	220,734	24.0	3.2	20.8		2.95

==== Current vital statistics ====
Period	Live births	Deaths	Natural increase
January—September 2025	180,346	25,401	+154,945
January—September 2026	175,826	26,228	+149,598
Difference	▼ –4,520 (−2.51%)	▲ +827 (+3.26%)	▼ –5,347

=== Life expectancy ===
Life expectancy in Tajikistan since 1950

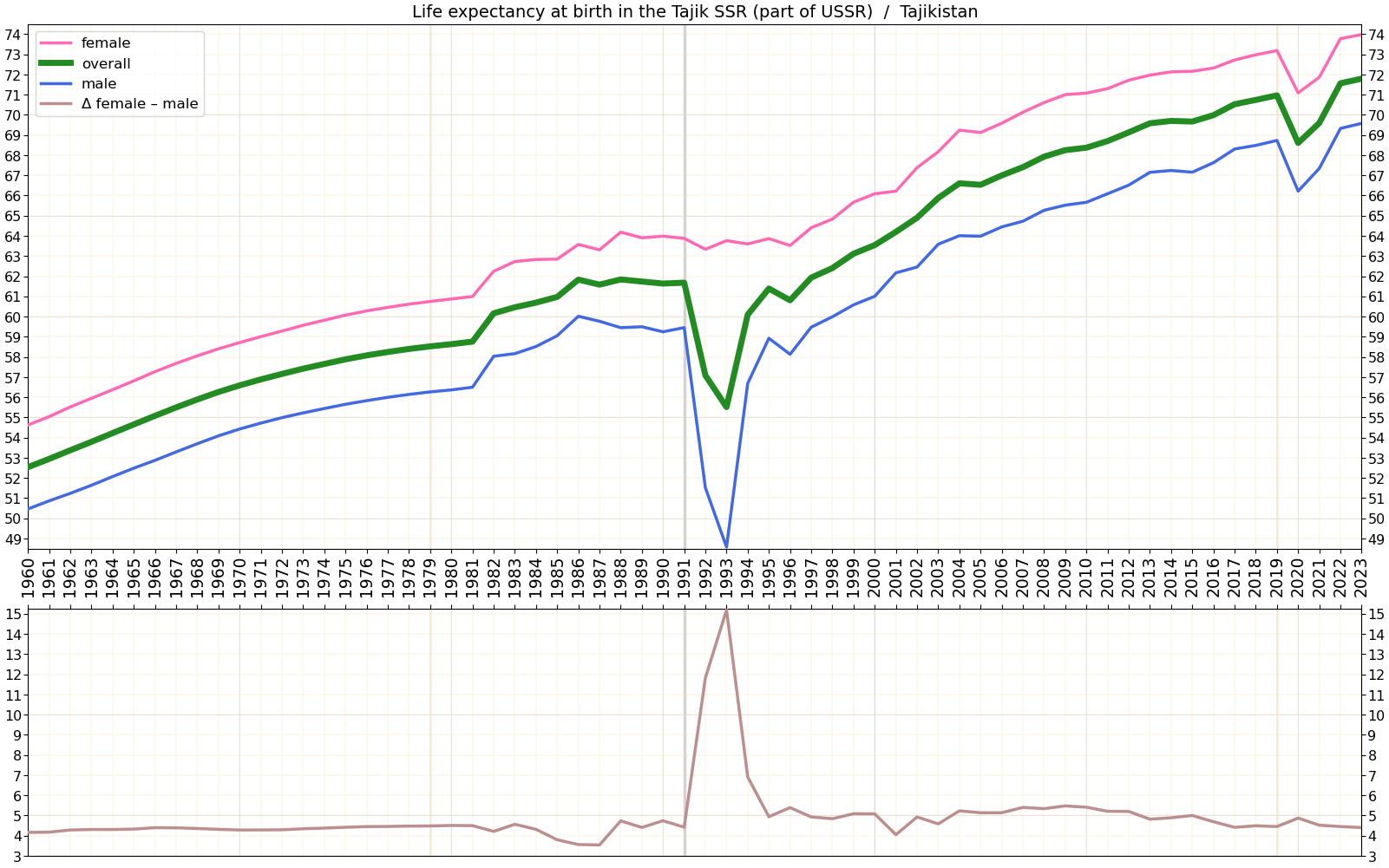
Life expectancy in Tajikistan since 1960 by gender

Period	Life expectancy in Years	Period	Life expectancy in Years
1950–1955	53.1	1985–1990	64.1
1955–1960	55.1	1990–1995	62.3
1960–1965	57.2	1995–2000	64.5
1965–1970	59.3	2000–2005	66.4
1970–1975	60.8	2005–2010	68.7
1975–1980	62.1	2010–2015	70.4
1980–1985	63.2		

=== Fertility ===
Fertility Rate (TFR) (Wanted Fertility Rate) and CBR (Crude Birth Rate):

Year	CBR (Total)	TFR (Total)	CBR (Urban)	TFR (Urban)	CBR (Rural)	TFR (Rural)
2012	33.9	3.8 (3.3)	28.9	3.3 (2.9)	35.6	3.9 (3.4)
2017	33.4	3.8 (3.5)	25.6	3.0 (2.8)	36.1	4.0 (3.7)
2023	27.1	3.5 (3.2)	25.4	3.2 (3.1)	27.8	3.5 (3.3)

Years	1925	1926	1927	1928	1929	1930	1931	1932	1933	1934
Total Fertility Rate in Tajikistan	5.87	5.87	5.87	5.87	5.87	5.87	5.87	5.87	5.87	5.87

Years	1935	1936	1937	1938	1939	1940	1941	1942	1943	1944
Total Fertility Rate in Tajikistan	5.87	5.87	5.87	5.87	5.87	5.87	5.87	5.87	5.87	5.87

Years	1945	1946	1947	1948	1949
Total Fertility Rate in Tajikistan	5.87	5.87	5.87	5.87	5.87

=== Regional birth data ===
There were slightly over 224,000 births in Tajikistan in 2017, down from 230,000 in 2016. Most births occurred in Khatlon Region (89,000 births), followed by Sughd Region (61,000 births) and the Districts of Republican Subordination (53,000 births). The fewest births were recorded in the Gorno-Badakhshan Autonomous Region in eastern Tajikistan, with around 5,700 births. Dushanbe city recorded approximately 15,500 births in 2017.

The crude birth rate for Tajikistan was 25.4‰ in 2017, down from 28.1‰ two years earlier (in 2015). Khatlon Region had the highest birth rate (28.1‰) in 2017, while the city of Dushanbe had the lowest, at 18.8‰.

Crude birth rate by division from 2000 to 2018
Division	2000	2002	2004	2006	2008	2010	2012	2014	2016	2018
Gorno-Badakhshan Autonomous Region	17.4	20.3	19.2	23.8	17.3	18.4	19.8	21.9	23.7	23.5
Sughd Region	25.1	25.4	23.9	24.0	25.8	29.4	27.6	28.2	24.9	24.2
Khatlon Region	28.6	29.0	31.9	29.4	30.5	31.1	29.4	31.1	30.0	28.5
Dushanbe city	28.5	25.6	20.9	20.4	25.6	24.1	22.8	16.5	17.5	18.4
Districts of Republican Subordination	28.1	28.8	26.0	27.9	28.8	30.2	28.5	27.5	27.5	25.9
Tajikistan	27.0	27.3	26.8	26.7	27.9	29.4	27.8	27.8	26.6	25.6

== Ethnic groups ==
Ethnic Groups in 2020 Census

- Tajiks 86.1%
- Uzbeks 11.3%
- Kyrgyz 0.4%
- Russians 0.3%
- Other 1.9%
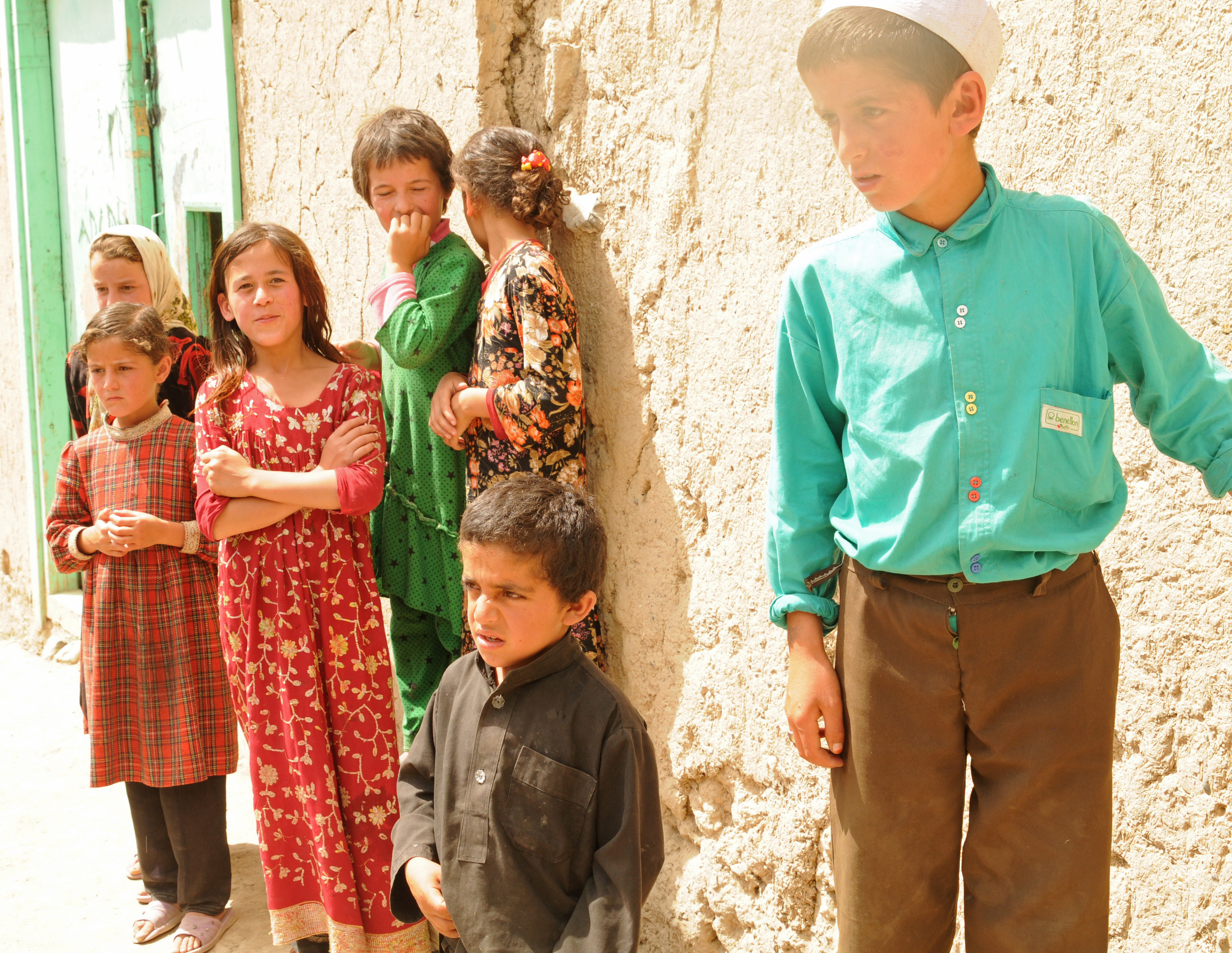
Tajik children

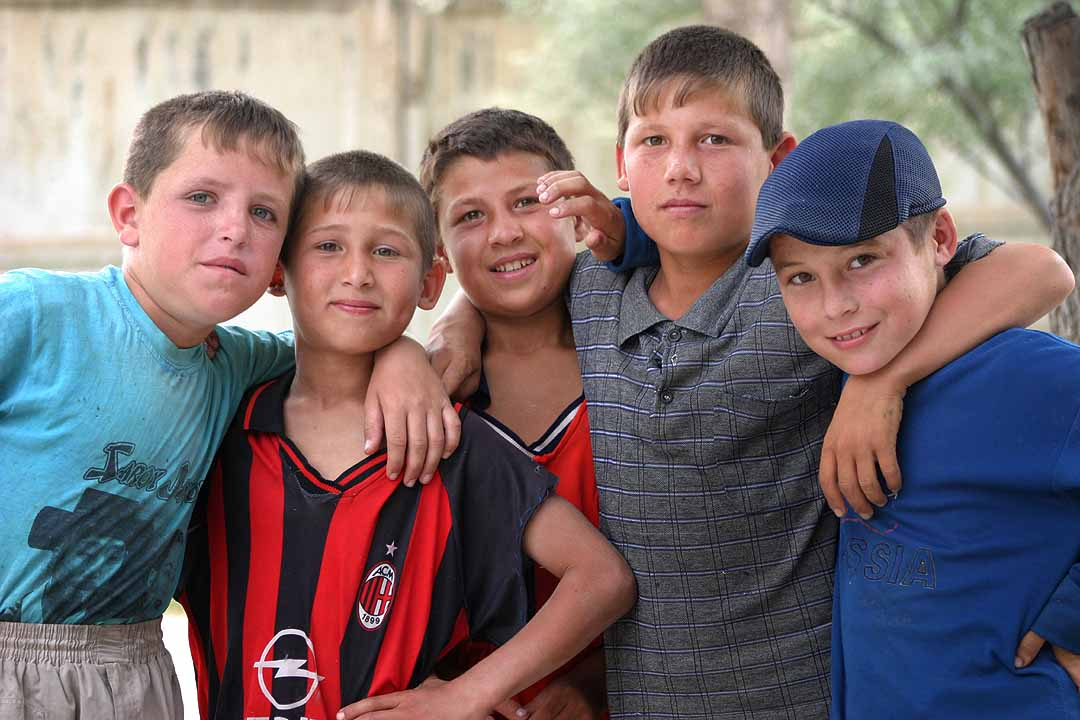
Group of boys in Tajikistan

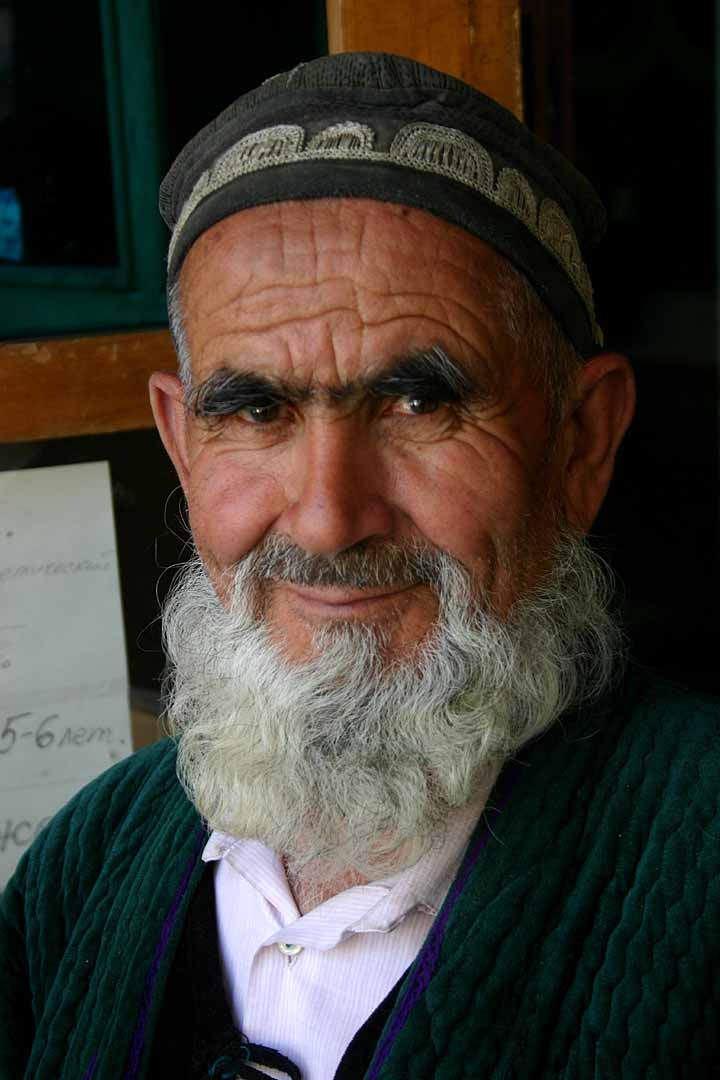
A Tajik man in traditional headgear (2005).

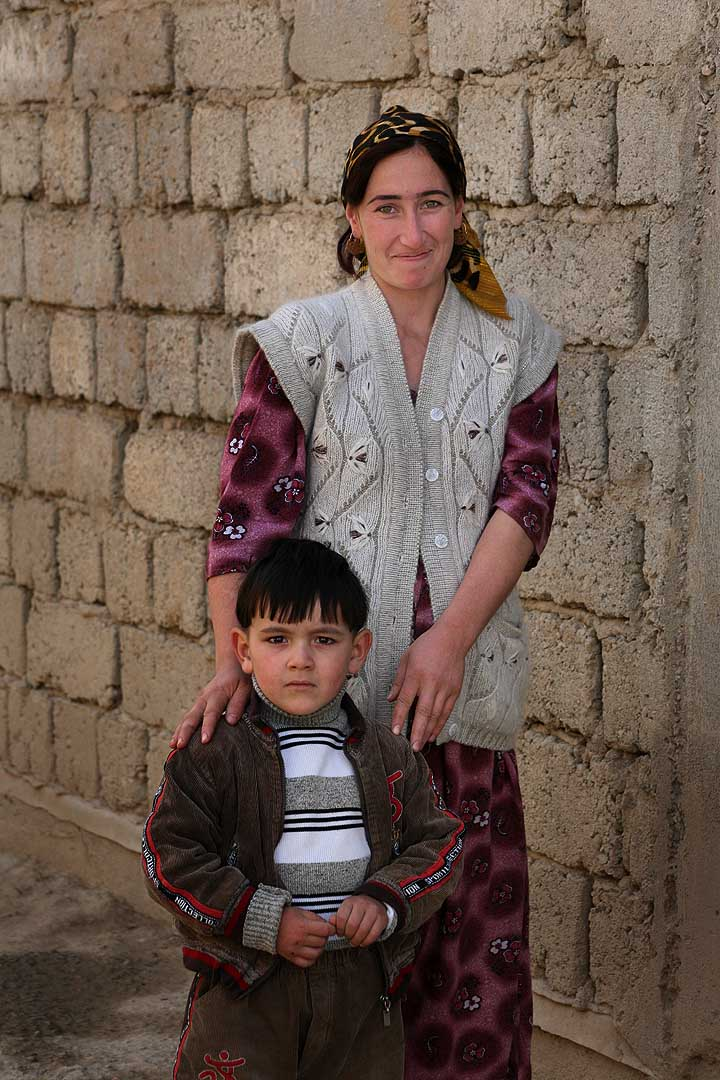
A Tajik woman and her son.

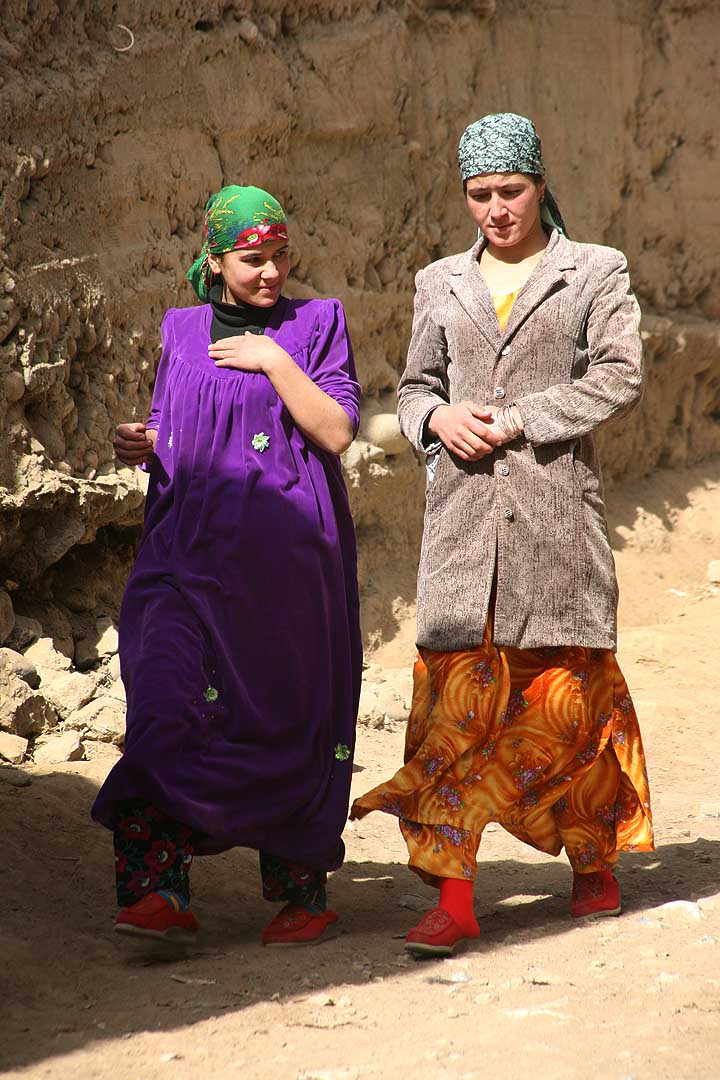
Two young Tajik women

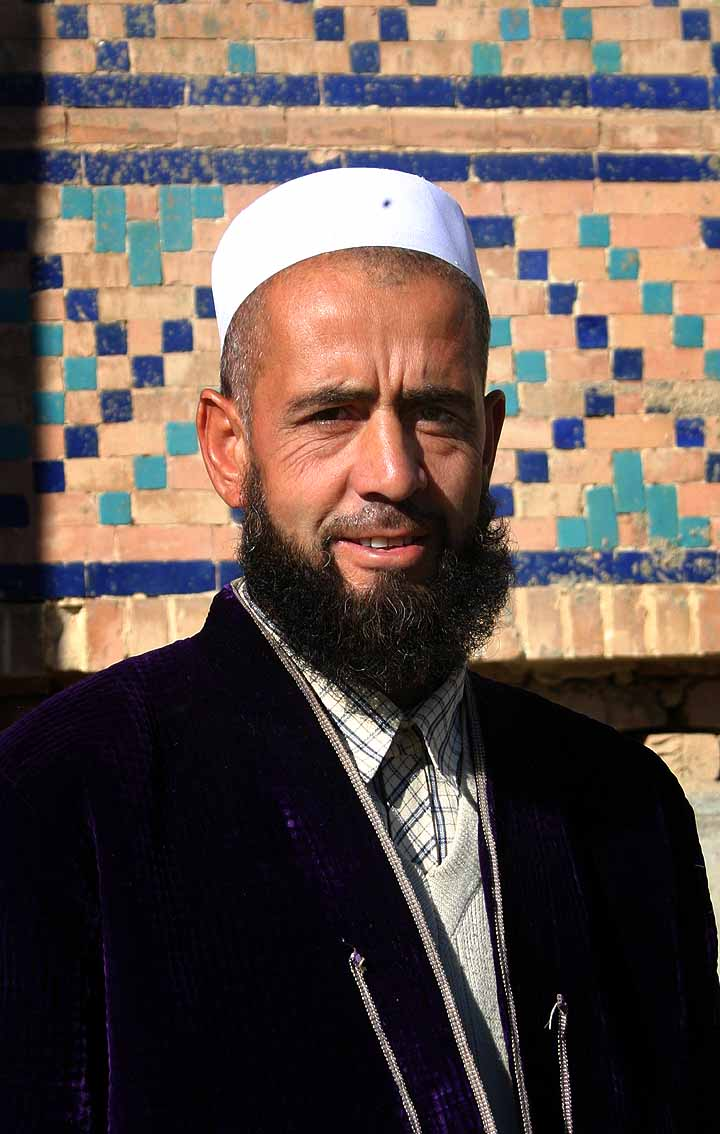
A religious scholar from Tajikistan (2005)

=== Ethnic makeup according to the population censuses from 1926 to 2020 ===
Note: The category Tajiks also includes ethnic Pamiris, of whom 65% are Shughni speakers, 13% are Rushani speakers, 12% speak Wakhi, 5% are Bartangi speakers, 3% are Yazgulyami speakers, 1.5% speak Khufi, and 0.8% are Ishkashimi speakers. In addition, there are a few thousand speakers of Yagnobi. According to the 2000 census, excluding the people whose native languages are Pamiri or Yagnobi, Tajiks account for 77.6% of the population, while Pamiris and Yagnobis account for 2.3%.

Population of Tajikistan according to ethnic group 1926–2020
Ethnic group	census 1926		census 1939		census 1959		census 1970		census 1979		census 1989		census 2000		census 2010		census 2020	
Ethnic group	Number	%	Number	%	Number	%	Number	%	Number	%	Number	%	Number	%	Number	%	Number	%
Tajiks	617,125	74.6	883,966	59.5	1,051,164	53.1	1,629,920	56.2	2,237,048	58.8	3,172,420	62.3	4,898,400	79.9	6,373,834	84.3	8,314,700	86.1
Yagnobi	1,829	0.2	883,966	59.5	1,051,164	53.1	1,629,920	56.2	2,237,048	58.8	3,172,420	62.3	4,898,400	79.9	6,373,834	84.3	8,314,700	86.1
Uzbeks	175,627	21.2	353,478	23.8	454,433	23.0	665,662	23.0	873,199	22.9	1,197,841	23.5	1,012,500	16.5	926,344	12.2	1,091,200	11.3
Kyrgyz	11,410	1.4	27,968	1.9	25,635	1.3	35,485	1.2	48,376	1.3	63,832	1.3	65,500	1.1	60,715	0.8	38,600	0.4
Russians	5,638	0.7	134,916	9.1	262,610	13.3	344,109	11.9	395,089	10.4	388,481	7.6	68,200	1.1	34,838	0.5	29,000	0.3
Turkmen	4,148	0.5	4,040	0.3	7,115	0.4	11,043	0.4	13,991	0.4	20,487	0.4	20,300	0.3	15,171	0.2	183,500	1.9
Tatars	950	0.1	18,296	1.2	56,893	2.9	70,803	2.4	79,529	2.1	79,442	1.6	19,000	0.3	6,495	0.1	183,500	1.9
Arabs	3,260	0.4	2,290	0.2	1,297	0.1	248	0.0	176	0.0	276	0.0	14,500	0.2	4,184	0.1	183,500	1.9
Others	7,180	0.9	60,137	4.0	120,750	6.1	142,332	4.9	158,812	4.2	169,824	3.3	29,100	0.5	142,921	1.9	183,500	1.9
Total	827,167		1,485,091		1,979,897		2,899,602		3,806,220		5,092,603		6,127,500		7,564,502		9,657,005	
^{1} Source: . ^{2} Source: . ^{3} Source: . ^{4} Source: . ^{5} Source: . ^{6} Source: ^{7} including 51,000 Lakai, 15,100 Kongrat, 4,900 Katagan, 3,700 Barlos and 1,100 Yuz. ^{8} Source: , p. 7. including 65,555 Lakai, 38,078 Kongrat, 7,601 Katagan, 5,271 Barlos and 3,798 Yuz . ^{9}Source

== Languages ==
Several dialects of Persian (Central Asian dialects of Persian) are spoken in Tajikistan, and Persian is one of the two official languages of the country (officially referred to as Tajik). Russian is the official inter-ethnic language and is widely used in both government and business. The different ethnic minorities speak various languages, including Uzbek, Turkmen, Kyrgyz, and Khowar. In the Gorno-Badakhshan Autonomous Province, Shughni, as well as other Pamir languages, are spoken. In the northern Yaghnob valley, the Yaghnobi language is still spoken.

== Religion ==
Religion in Tajikistan (2020) by ARDA
Religion	Percent
Sunni Islam	87.55%
Shia Islam	9.9%
No religion	1.67%
Other	1.19%
Christianity	0.69%

Religious demographics as of 2020.

- Sunni Islam 87.55%
- Shia Ismaili Islam 9.9%
- Other 3.55%

== See also ==
- Demographics of Central Asia
