= St Joseph Church, Dushanbe =

St Joseph Church
- Церковь Святого Иосифа в Душанбе
- St Joseph Church
- Location: Titova St., proezd 21, dom 10; Dushanbe
- Country: Tajikistan
- Denomination: Roman Catholic Church

St Joseph Church (Russian: Церковь Святого Иосифа в Душанбе, romanized: Tserkovʹ Svyatogo Iosifa v Dushanbe) is a parish of the Roman Catholic Church located near Dushanbe International Airport in Dushanbe, Tajikistan.

Masses in the church for the small Catholic community are held in Russian. The church follows the Roman or Latin Rite and is part of the mission sui juris of Tajikistan. In the same area there is another parish church that is dedicated to St Roch.

Parishioners are from different ethnic groups or nationalities including Germans, Lithuanians, Poles, Russians and Tajiks. This diversity stems from the deportations in the Soviet Union in the 1930s and 1940s.

== See also ==
- St. Joseph's Church (disambiguation)
- Roman Catholicism in Tajikistan
- Christianity in Tajikistan
