= Anthony Corcoran =

American-born Kyrgyzstani Roman Catholic bishop (born 1963)

The Most Reverend Anthony Corcoran SJ
- Apostolic Administrator of Kyrgyzstan
- Church: Catholic Church
- Appointed: 29 August 2017
- Predecessor: Janez Mihelčič
- Other post: Titular Bishop of Aëtus (2026–present)

Orders
- Ordination: 8 June 1996 by Oscar Hugh Lipscomb
- Consecration: 29 September 2026 by Giorgio Marengo

Personal details
- Born: 19 April 1963 (age 63) Tucson, Arizona, U.S.
- Education: Marquette University; Fordham University; Weston School of Theology

Anthony James Corcoran (born 19 April 1963) is an American-born Kyrgyzstani Catholic prelate serving as Apostolic Administrator of Kyrgyzstan since 2017 and was made Titular Bishop of Aëtus in 2026. He is a member of the Jesuits.

== Early life and education ==
Corcoran was born on 19 April 1963 in Tucson, Arizona. His parents were both born in Bisbee, Arizona, and he was baptized as an infant at St. Andrew's Catholic Church in Sierra Vista, Arizona. Although his family later moved to Texas, he maintained connections with southern Arizona and regularly returned to visit relatives.

In 1985, Corcoran graduated from Marquette University in Milwaukee with a degree in political science. He entered the Society of Jesus on 14 August 1985. He subsequently earned a master's degree in International Political Economics of Development from Fordham University in 1990.

From 1990 to 1992, he taught at Jesuit High School in New Orleans. He studied theology at the Weston School of Theology in Cambridge, Massachusetts, receiving a theology degree in 1995 and a licentiate in spiritual theology in 1997. He was ordained a deacon in 1995 and a priest on 8 June 1996. He later completed a doctorate in theology at Weston School of Theology in 2006.

== Jesuit ministry ==
After his ordination, Corcoran undertook ministry in Russia and Siberia. He served as director of the Interdiocesan Pre-Seminary in Novosibirsk from 1998 to 2000 and again from 2007 to 2008, and as its spiritual director from 2001 to 2005. He was also pastor of St. Joseph Parish in Berdsk from 1998 to 2008 and vicar general of the Diocese of the Transfiguration in Novosibirsk from 1999 to 2008.

In 2009, Corcoran became superior of the Independent Russian Region of the Society of Jesus, a position he held until 2017.

According to the Society of Jesus, his missionary work also included service in Cambodia and Pakistan, in addition to his long ministry in Russia and Central Asia. He became fluent in Russian and also speaks Spanish.

Corcoran professed his final vows as a Jesuit in Moscow in 2002.

== Apostolic Administrator of Kyrgyzstan ==
On 29 August 2017, Pope Francis appointed Corcoran Apostolic Administrator of Kyrgyzstan. At the time of his appointment, he was serving in the Russian region of the Society of Jesus. He was installed in the office on 17 December 2017.

The Catholic community of Kyrgyzstan is relatively small, and the country does not constitute a Catholic diocese. Corcoran consequently served as the principal pastoral authority of the Catholic community as apostolic administrator rather than as diocesan bishop.

The mission in Kyrgyzstan was entrusted to the Society of Jesus, and Corcoran's ministry there has included pastoral work with the country's Catholic community. The Jesuit Conference of European Provincials described his appointment to the episcopate as strengthening the local Church and emphasizing cooperation between the Catholic Church's local structures and the Jesuit order.

== Episcopacy ==
On 25 May 2026, Pope Leo XIV elevated Corcoran to the episcopal dignity and assigned him the titular see of Aëtus, an ancient episcopal see in Greece. He retained his position as Apostolic Administrator of Kyrgyzstan.

The appointment made Corcoran the second Catholic bishop serving in Kyrgyzstan despite the country having no diocesan episcopal see. The Society of Jesus described the appointment as a recognition of his long missionary service in the country.

His episcopal ordination was on 29 September 2026 at the Basilica of Saint Paul Outside the Walls in Rome, with Cardinal Giorgio Marengo as principal consecrator.

== Pastoral outlook ==
Corcoran has spoken of the importance of Catholic identity transcending ethnic and cultural differences. Reflecting on his upbringing in southern Arizona, he recalled the diverse religious and ethnic community in which his parents grew up and said that these experiences influenced his understanding of the Catholic Church as a community united in faith.

His ministry has been characterized by missionary service across several countries and cultures. Colleagues in Arizona have described him as a missionary priest with particular gifts for building relationships across cultural boundaries.

== See also ==
Catholic Church in Kyrgyzstan
