= Mission sui iuris of Turkmenistan =

Roman Catholic missionary jurisdiction in Turkmenistan

The Mission sui iuris of Turkmenistan is a Catholic (Latin Church) mission sui iuris (pre-diocesan jurisdiction) for the Catholics of Turkmenistan.

It is exempt, i.e. directly subject to the Holy See (not part of any ecclesiastical province) and has its headquarters in the Turkmen capital Aşgabat, but no see.

== History ==
On 29 September 1997, the Holy See established the Mission sui iuris on territory split off from the then Apostolic Administration of Kazakhstan (shortly after promoted to Diocese of Karaganda, after missions sui iuris were also split off for Kyrgyzstan, Tajikistan and Uzbekistan, all in 1997).

By 2014, the mission was run by the Oblates of Mary Immaculate; there was a community of approximately 150 people who attended mass in both Russian and English.

== Ecclesiastical superiors ==
- Father Andrzej Madej, Missionary Oblates of Mary Immaculate (O.M.I.) (September 29, 1997– June 22, 2025)
- Father Pawel Janusz Kubiak (O.M.I.) (August 22, 2026 – )
