= Protestantism in Tajikistan =

Protestants composed less than 1% of the population of Tajikistan in 2020. There is a Lutheran congregation in Dushanbe. There are about 3,000 evangelicals, who mainly are of Russian origin. The Constitution provides for religious freedom. There are Methodist and Seventh-day Adventist congregations in Tajikistan. Many Christians are from South Asia. According to the European Baptist Federation, government officials view the nation's Christians in the same light as militant Muslims.

== Baptist Brotherhood of Tajikistan ==
Baptist work in Tajikistan started in 1929. The Baptist Brotherhood of Tajikistan consists of seven self-governing churches and 23 affiliate groups. According to the European Baptist Federation, the Baptist community has around 1000 members. The chairman of the Baptist Brotherhood of Tajikistan is the Russian-German Alexandr Vervai. There is mission of Baptists among Tajiks.

== List of Denominations ==
- Baptist Churches in Tajikistan
- German Evangelical Lutheran Church
- Korean Methodist Church
- Pentecostal Churches

== See also ==
- Religion in Tajikistan
- Christianity in Tajikistan
- Catholic Church in Tajikistan
