= Jerzy Maculewicz =

Mons. Jerzy Maculewicz, O.F.M.Conv.
- Titular Bishop of Nara, Apostolic Administrator of Uzbekistan
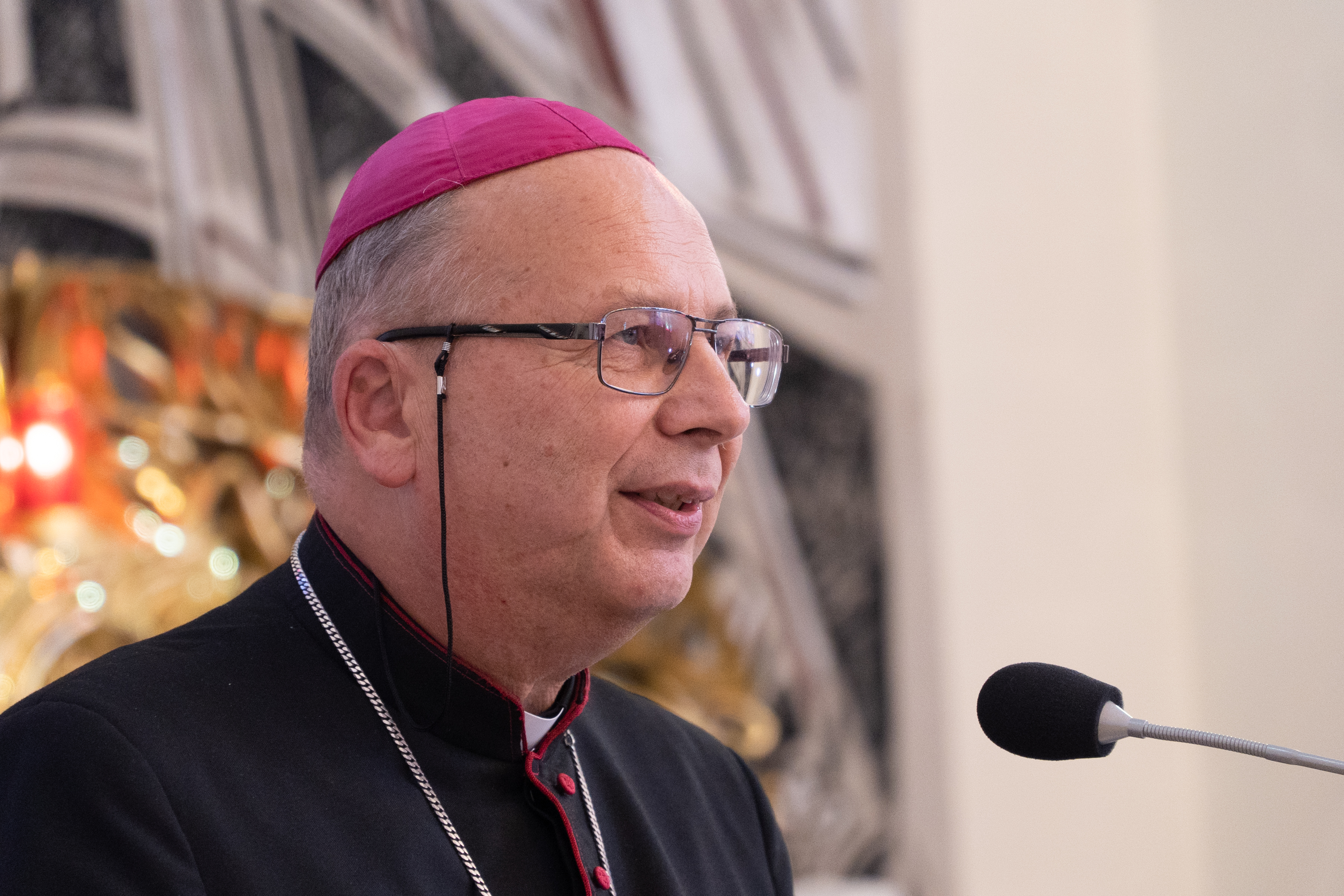
- Church: Roman Catholic Church
- Appointed: 1 April 2005
- Predecessor: Krzysztof Kukulka (as Superior of Mission "Sui Iuris")
- Successor: Incumbent
- Other post: Vice-President of the Bishops' Conference of Central Asia (2022–)
- Previous post: Assistant General of the Order for Eastern Europe (2001–2005)

Orders
- Ordination: 22 June 1996 (Priest) by Adam Śmigielski
- Consecration: 14 May 2005 (Bishop) by Cardinal Angelo Sodano

Personal details
- Born: Jerzy Maculewicz; 30 May 1955 (age 71) Dashiv, Ukrainian SSR (present day Ukraine)
- Education: Major Theological Seminary in Kraków, Pontifical University of St. Bonaventure

Bishop Jerzy Maculewicz, O.F.M.Conv. (born 30 May 1955) is a Roman Catholic prelate who serves as the first Apostolic Administrator of the Apostolic Administration of Uzbekistan and Titular Bishop of Nara since 1 April 2005.

== Education ==
Bishop Maculewicz was born into a Polish-Russian Roman Catholic family in Dashiv, Vinnytsia Oblast, then of the Soviet Union. His father Stanisław was a Polish and mother Serafima (née Koltsova) was Russian. He grew up in Łazy, Bydgoszcz and Dąbrowa Górnicza (since 1963) in Poland, where his parents were resettled in 1957.

After finishing secondary school, he graduated at the energetical technikum in Sosnowiec, completed his compulsory military service in the Polish Army and worked as an electrician, in the same time was engaged in the parish life as a layperson. In 1989 he joined a mendicant Catholic religious community of the Order of Friars Minor Conventual and after the novitiate in Kalwaria Pacławska made a solemn profession on 2 October 1994. Also Jerzy consequently studied at the Major Theological Seminary in Kraków and continued his studies at the Pontifical University of St. Bonaventure in Rome, Italy with the licentiate of the Christology degree and was ordained a priest on 22 June 1996 by Bishop Adam Śmigielski in Kraków, after completed his philosophical and theological studies.

Coat of arms of Bishop Jerzy Maculewicz

== Pastoral, administrative and educational work ==
After his ordination, during 1997–2000 Fr. Maculewicz worked at the St. Maksymilian Centrum in Harmęże near Oświęcim, and for two years he lectured the Mariology at the Franciscan Major Theological Seminary in Kraków. He was elected vicar and secretary of his province at the Provincial Chapter in 2000, and a year later at the General Chapter, he was elected an Assistant General of the Order for Eastern Europe. During these years (2001-2005) he continuously visited all areas of the order that fell under its jurisdiction, including the Mission sui iuris of Uzbekistan, entrusted to the Conventual Franciscans from this province.

== Prelate ==
On 1 April 2005, he was appointed by Pope John Paul II as the Titular Bishop of Nara and an Apostolic Administrator of the newly created Apostolic Administration of Uzbekistan. On 14 May 2005, he was consecrated as bishop by Cardinal Angelo Sodano and other prelates of the Roman Catholic Church in the Basilica of the Twelve Holy Apostles in Rome and was installed on 26 June 2005 in Tashkent.

On 29 April 2022 he was elected the Vice-President of the newly created Bishops' Conference of Central Asia.

Catholic Church titles
Preceded by Jerome E. Listecki	Titular Bishop of Nara; 2005–present	Incumbent
Preceded by Krzysztof Kukulka (as Superior of Mission Sui Iuris)	Apostolic Administrator of Uzbekistan; 2005–present	Incumbent
