= List of ethnic groups in Tajikistan =

The list of ethnic groups in Tajikistan is a page about the ethnic groups in Tajikistan by population through time.

== Ethnic group in Tajikistan by population ==
Ethnic group	2010 census	2000 census	1989 census
Tajiks	6,373,834; 84.3%	4,898,382; 79.9%	3,172,420; 62.3%
Uzbeks	926,344; 12.2%	936,703; 15.3%	1,197,841; 23.5%
Kyrgyzs	60,715; 0.8%	65,515; 1.1%	63,832; 1.3%
Russians	34,838; 0.5%	68,171; 1.1%	388,481; 7.6%
Turkmens	15,171; 0.2%	20,270; 0.3%	20,487; 0.4%
Tatars	6,495; 0.1%	18,939; 0.3%	72,228; 1.4%
Arabs	4,184; 0.1%	14,450; 0.2%	276; 0%
Afghans	3,675; 0%	4,702; 0.1%	2,088; 0%
Romanis	2,344; 0%	4,249; 0.1%	1,791; 0%
Turks	1,360; 0%	672; 0%	768; 0%
Ukrainians	1,090; 0%	3,787; 0.1%	41,375; 0.8%
Chinese	801; 0%	24; 0%	58; 0%
Koreans	634; 0%	1,696; 0%	13,431; 0.3%
Kazakhs	595; 0%	936; 0%	11,376; 0.2%
Persians	473; 0%	306; 0%	388; 0%
Germans	446; 0%	1,136; 0%	32,671; 0.6%
Armenians	434; 0%	995; 0%	5,651; 0.1%
Ossetians	396; 0%	960; 0%	7,861; 0.2%
Azerbaijanis	371; 0%	798; 0%	3,556; 0.1%
Uyghurs	276; 0%	379; 0%	566; 0%
Karelians	166; 0%	7; 0%	29; 0%
Moldovans	157; 0%	341; 0%	879; 0%
Bashkirs	143; 0%	872; 0%	6,821; 0.1%
Belarusians	104; 0%	464; 0%	7,247; 0.1%
English	104; 0%	43; 0%	1; 0%
Georgians	92; 0%	161; 0%	976; 0%
Americans	62; 0%	24; 0%	3; 0%
Chuvashs	47; 0%	195; 0%	2,512; 0%
Mordvins	42; 0%	300; 0%	5,519; 0.1%
Jews	34; 0%	182; 0%	9,701; 0.2%
Greeks	28; 0%	41; 0%	590; 0%
Poles	23; 0%	74; 0%	716; 0%
Chechens	20; 0%	47; 0%	128; 0%
Bulgarians	19; 0%	64; 0%	1,072; 0%
Crimean Tatars	18; 0%	138; 0%	7,214; 0.1%
Siberian Tatars	17; 0%	10; 0%	0; 0%
Maris	13; 0%	60; 0%	606; 0%
Lezgins	13; 0%	51; 0%	307; 0%
Avars	13; 0%	19; 0%	191; 0%
Udmurts	12; 0%	39; 0%	635; 0%
Lithuanians	11; 0%	40; 0%	531; 0%
Ingushs	11; 0%	16; 0%	88; 0%
Estonians	10; 0%	20; 0%	147; 0%
Latvians	9; 0%	104; 0%	310; 0%
Australians	9; 0%	1; 0%	3; 0%
Kabardins	8; 0%	11; 0%	244; 0%
Kurds	7; 0%	17; 0%	56; 0%
Spanish	7; 0%	2; 0%	4; 0%
French	7; 0%	0; 0%	0; 0%
Dargwa	6; 0%	39; 0%	340; 0%
Buryats	6; 0%	26; 0%	162; 0%
Tabasarans	6; 0%	17; 0%	60; 0%
Dutch	6; 0%	19; 0%	5; 0%
Kumyks	5; 0%	26; 0%	125; 0%
Cherkess	5; 0%	14; 0%	86; 0%
Finns	5; 0%	9; 0%	76; 0%
Abazins	5; 0%	57; 0%	41; 0%
Karakalpaks	4; 0%	34; 0%	163; 0%
Khakass	4; 0%	6; 0%	84; 0%
Abkhazians	4; 0%	67; 0%	44; 0%
Romanians	4; 0%	5; 0%	33; 0%
Koryaks	4; 0%	3; 0%	5; 0%
Chuvans	4; 0%	11; 0%	14; 0%
Vietnamese	3; 0%	9; 0%	3; 0%
Bukharan Jews	2; 0%	15; 0%	4,879; 0.1%
Laks (Dagestan)	2; 0%	147; 0%	1,398; 0%
Crimean Karaites	2; 0%	29; 0%	16; 0%
Komi-Permyaks	2; 0%	4; 0%	67; 0%
Karachays	2; 0%	11; 0%	45; 0%
Balkars	2; 0%	45; 0%	42; 0%
Slovaks	2; 0%	5; 0%	5; 0%
Italians	2; 0%	1; 0%	23; 0%
Japanese	2; 0%	0; 0%	3; 0%
Tofalars	2; 0%	2; 0%	0; 0%
Komis	1; 0%	4; 0%	154; 0%
Nenets	1; 0%	26; 0%	33; 0%
Dungans	1; 0%	132; 0%	22; 0%
Hungarians	1; 0%	0; 0%	21; 0%
Aguls	1; 0%	9; 0%	20; 0%
Nogays	1; 0%	15; 0%	28; 0%

== See also ==
- Demographics of Tajikistan
