= Apostolic Administration of Kyrgyzstan =

Coordinates: 42.8947°N 74.6105°E

Apostolic administration of Apostolic Administration of Kyrgyzstan Administratio Apostolica Kyrgyzstaniana

Location
- Country: Kyrgyzstan
- Ecclesiastical province: Immediately subject to the Holy See

Statistics
- Area: 199,951 km^{2} (77,202 sq mi)
- Population: Total; Catholics: (as of 2024); 7000000; 1000 (0.01%%)
- Parishes: 4

Information
- Rite: Latin
- Established: 22 December 1997 (as Mission sui iuris); 18 March 2006 (as Apostolic Administration)
- Cathedral: St. Michael's Cathedral (under construction in Bishkek)
- Secular priests: 5

Current leadership
- Apostolic Administrator: Anthony Corcoran, SJ
- Bishops emeritus: Janez Mihelčič, SJ (Apostolic Administrator Emeritus)

Website
- www.catholic.kg

The Apostolic Administration of Kyrgyzstan is a Catholic (Latin Church) Apostolic Administration (pre-diocesan jurisdiction; originally an Independent Mission) for the Catholics of Kyrgyzstan (West Turkistan, Central Asia).

It is exempt, i.e. directly subject to the Holy See (not part of any ecclesiastical province) and has no (pro-)cathedral see yet.

The area has three parishes, Bishkek, Talas, and Jalalabad. Most parishioners have a Polish, German or Korean background.

== History ==
On 22 December 1997, the Holy See established the Mission sui iuris of Kyrgyzstan on territory split off from the then Apostolic Administration of Kazakhstan (shortly after promoted to Diocese of Karaganda, after missiones sui iuris were also split off for Tajikistan, Turkmenistan and Uzbekistan, all in 1997).

On 18 March 2006, the independent mission was promoted as Apostolic Administration.

== Ordinaries ==
Ecclesiastical superior of the Mission sui iuris

- Father Aleksandr Kan, S.J. (1997.12.22 – 2006.03.18)

Apostolic Administrators

- Nikolaus Messmer, S.J., titular bishop of Carmeiano (2006.03.18 – 2016.07.18)
- Janez Mihelčič, S.J. (2016.08.01 – 2017.08.29)
- Anthony Corcoran, S.J., titular bishop of Aeto (since 2017.08.29)

== See also ==
- Roman Catholicism in Kyrgyzstan
