= Bir El Hafey =

Bir El Hafey بئر الحفي
- Commune and town
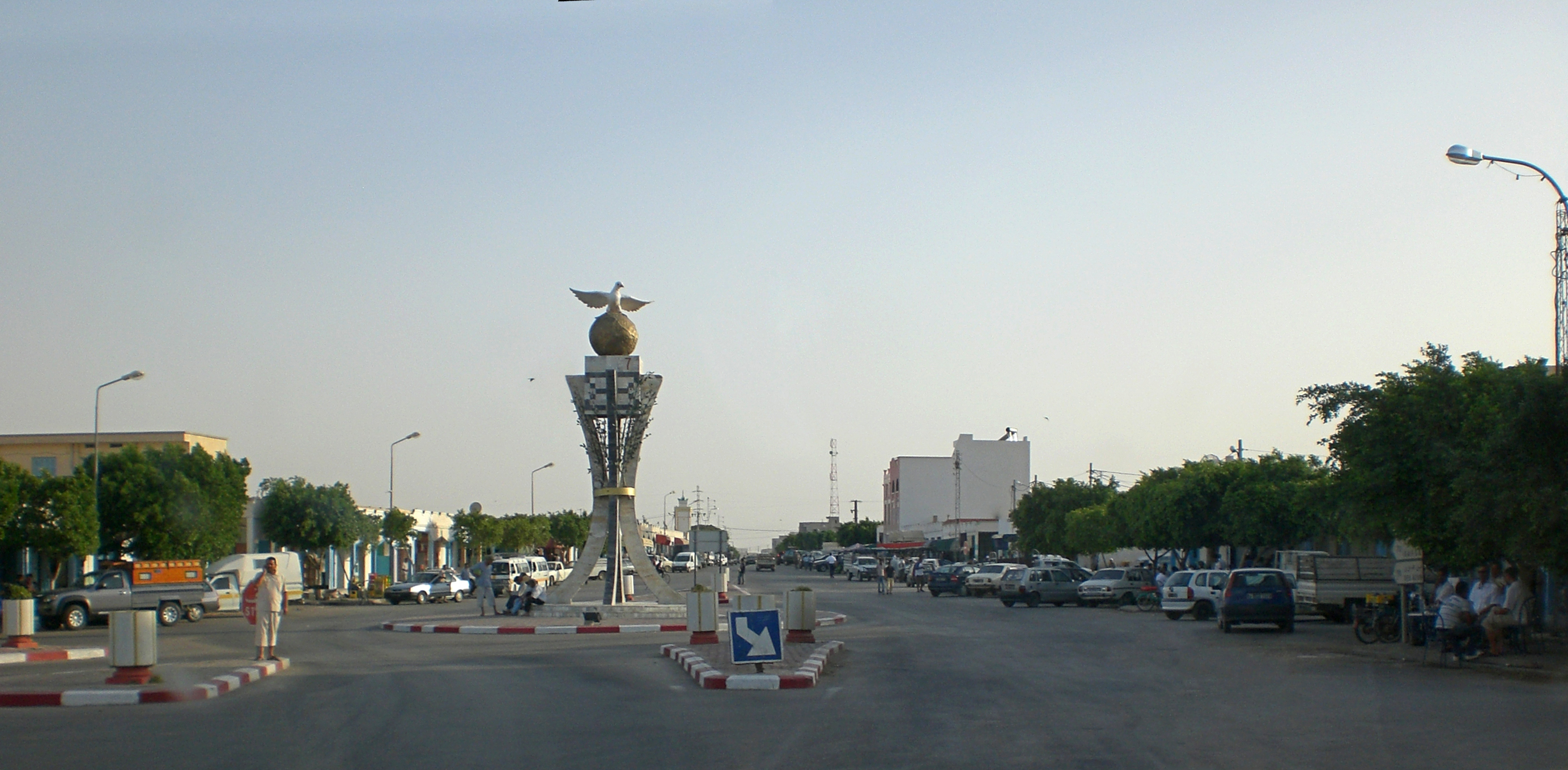
- Bir Lihfey-edit.
- Nickname: l'hafey
- Interactive map of Bir El Hafey
- Country: Tunisia
- Governorate: Sidi Bouzid Governorate

Government
  - Mayor: Marouan Arfaoui (People’s Movement)

Population (2014)
  - Total: 6,498
- Time zone: UTC+1 (CET)
- Postal code: 9113

Bir El Hafey (Arabic: بئر الحفي) is a town and commune located at 34°55′48″N 9°12′00″E in the Sidi Bouzid Governorate, in Tunisia (Maghreb, North Africa). As of 2004 it had a population of 6,405.

Bir El Hafey is located about thirty kilometers south of Sidi Bouzid, in the southern foothills of the Tunisian ridge. Attached to the governorate of Sidi Bouzid, it is a municipality with 6,475 inhabitants in 2014. It is also the capital of a delegation.

It is in crossroads position on the Kairouan-Gafsa axis because crossed by the RN3 while being connected to Sidi Bouzid, the chief town of the governorate.

== History ==
Bir El Hafey is the modern site of the Ancient, notably Roman, city of Nara.

H.H. Abdul Wahab identified Bir El Hafey with the medieval city of Jamunis (a.k.a. Jamūnis al-Sābūn), one of the main cities of the Qammuda region. Jamunis is first mentioned in the 10th century, when it became the capital of Qammuda under the Zirid dynasty, replacing the nearby city of Madhkur, which had been sacked by the forces of Abu Yazid. However, Jamunis was probably an important city before this. It was the site of a battle in 1030 between the Zirid ruler al-Mu'izz ibn Badis and the Zenata Berbers, which al-Mu'izz won. Jamunis is no longer mentioned after the 11th century, having been sacked by the Banu Hilal.

Al-Bakri described the city of Jamunis as being surrounded by sand and olive trees and having a strong fortress which served as an agadir (granary). He wrote that it was surrounded by many large and prosperous villages. Al-Muqaddasi mentioned the village of Khawr al-Kaf as being among those villages. Jamunis also had many fig and almond orchards, as well as a jami mosque.

=== Ecclesiastical history ===
Nara was important enough in the Roman province of Byzacena to become a suffragan bishopric of the Metropolitan Archbishop of Hadrumetum, but faded. There are three bishops documented from Nara.

- Crescenziano participated in the Council of Cabarsussi, held in 393 by the Maximianists, a dissident sect of the Donatists, and he signed the council's acts.
- The Donatist Gennaro intervened at the 411 Carthage conference, which saw the Catholic and donatists from all over Roman North Africa debate. On that occasion the town had no Catholic bishops.
- Vittore was present at the synod assembled in Carthage in 484 by King Huneric of the Vandal Kingdom. After the council Vittore was exiled.

=== Titular see of Nara ===
The diocese was nominally in 1925 restored as a Latin titular bishopric.

It has had the following incumbents, all of the lowest (episcopal) rank :

- Raffaele Angelo Palazzi (柏長青), O.F.M. (1928.06.15 – 1946.04.11)
- Patrick Dunne (1946.08.08 – 1988.03.16)
- Nino Marzoli, C.R. (1988.04.16 – 2000.05.24)
- Jerome Edward Listecki (2000.11.07 – 2004.12.29), later Archbishop
- Jerzy Maculewicz, O.F.M. Conv., Apostolic Administrator of Uzbekistan (2005.04.01 – ...)

== Population ==
In 2004 the population of the town was 5589, and in 2014 this had increased to 6475.

== See also ==
- List of cities in Tunisia

== Sources and external links ==
- GigaCatholic with titular incumbent biography links
