= Apostolic Administration of Uzbekistan =

Coordinates: 41.3055°N 69.2960°E

The Apostolic Administration of Uzbekistan is a Roman Catholic (Latin Church) Apostolic Administration (pre-diocesan jurisdiction; originally an Independent Mission) for the Catholics of Uzbekistan (West Turkistan, Central Asia).

It is exempt, i.e. directly subject to the Holy See (not part of any ecclesiastical province) and entitled to a titular bishop.

Its episcopal see is the Cathedral of the Sacred Heart of Jesus, in the national capital Tashkent.

== History ==
On September 29, 1997, the Holy See established the Mission sui iuris of Uzbekistan on territory split off from the then Apostolic Administration of Kazakhstan (shortly after promoted to Diocese of Karaganda, after missiones sui iuris were also split off for Tajikistan, Turkmenistan and Kyrgyzstan, all in 1997).

On 1 April 2005, the independent mission was promoted as Apostolic Administration.

On June 17, 2012, the first Catholic priest from Uzbekistan, Father Sergey Fedorov, was ordained.

== Ordinaries ==
So far, all its superiors were East Europe-born missionary members of the Conventual Franciscans (O.F.M. Conv.)

Ecclesiastical superior of the Mission sui iuris

- Father Krzysztof Kukulka, O.F.M. Conv. (1997.09.29 – 2005.04.01)

Apostolic Administrators

- Jerzy Maculewicz, O.F.M. Conv. (2005.04.01 – ...), titular bishop of Nara

== See also ==
- Roman Catholicism in Uzbekistan

== Sources and external links ==
- GigaCatholic
