= Catholic Church in Tajikistan =

The Catholic Church in Tajikistan is part of the worldwide Catholic Church in Tajikistan (West Turkistan, Central Asia), under the spiritual leadership of the Pope in Rome.

In 2009, the size of the community was estimated at 300 people. By 2020, the number was believed to be 100 people, with 4 priests and 8 nuns across two parishes.

This Mission sui iuris (pre-diocesan jurisdiction, also known as Independent Mission) for the Catholics is exempt, i.e. directly subject to the Holy See (not part of any ecclesiastical province), and comprises three churches (in the Tajik capital Dushanbe, and Vakhsh near Bokhtar), but no see.

== History ==
In modern times the Catholic Church obtained a presence in Tajikistan through Soviet deportations, and in 1974, churches were opened in Dushanbe (St Joseph Church, Dushanbe) and Qurghonteppa. Most of the early Catholics were Germans of Russian, Ukrainian and Lithuanian origin. Many Catholics fled the 1990s civil war following the Soviet Union collapse. In 1997, Pope John Paul II created a mission sui iuris for the country to be administered by the Institute of the Incarnate Word of Argentina. On 29 September 1997, the Holy See established the Mission sui iuris on territory split off from the then Apostolic Administration of Kazakhstan (shortly after promoted to Diocese of Karaganda, after missiones sui iuris were also split off for Kyrgyzstan, Turkmenistan and Uzbekistan, all in 1997).

The Institute sent priests from South America to Tajikistan. In 2003, the Church opened a center and soup kitchen in Dushanbe for homeless children. By 2004, the mission had three parishes, one mission center, five priests, four nuns of the Missionaries of Charity, and its own website. In 2005, three sisters of the Servants of the Lord and Our Lady of Matara came to live in Tajikistan. The Missionaries of Charity started sewing classes for young women in 2006 so they might develop skills and further their education. In July 2007, Father Avila joined with the 22 non-Islamic religious groups in the country to object to a bill that would greatly restrict the activities of religious minorities. In March 2008, many poor and elderly citizens queued at the nuns house in Dushanbe to receive aid from Caritas Tajikistan, Care International and United States Catholic Relief Service to survive the harsh winter.

In 2012, there were three Tajiks studying for the priesthood and three who wished to be nuns. In 2017 and 2018, the first two Tajik Catholic priests were ordained, both members of the Institute of the Incarnate Word.

== Ecclesiastical superiors ==
So far, all its superiors were Argentina-born missionary members of the Institute of the Incarnate Word (I.V.E.)

- Father Carlos Antonio Ávila, I.V.E. (1997.09.29 – 2013.09.19)
- Father Pedro Ramiro López, I.V.E. (2013.09.19 – ...)

== See also ==
- Christianity in Tajikistan
- Religion in Tajikistan
- Protestantism in Tajikistan
