= Diocese of Most Holy Trinity in Almaty =

Diocese of the Catholic Church in Kazakhstan

Coordinates: 43.2565°N 76.8705°E

Diocese of Most Holy Trinity in Almaty Dioecesis Sanctissimae Trinitatis in Almata
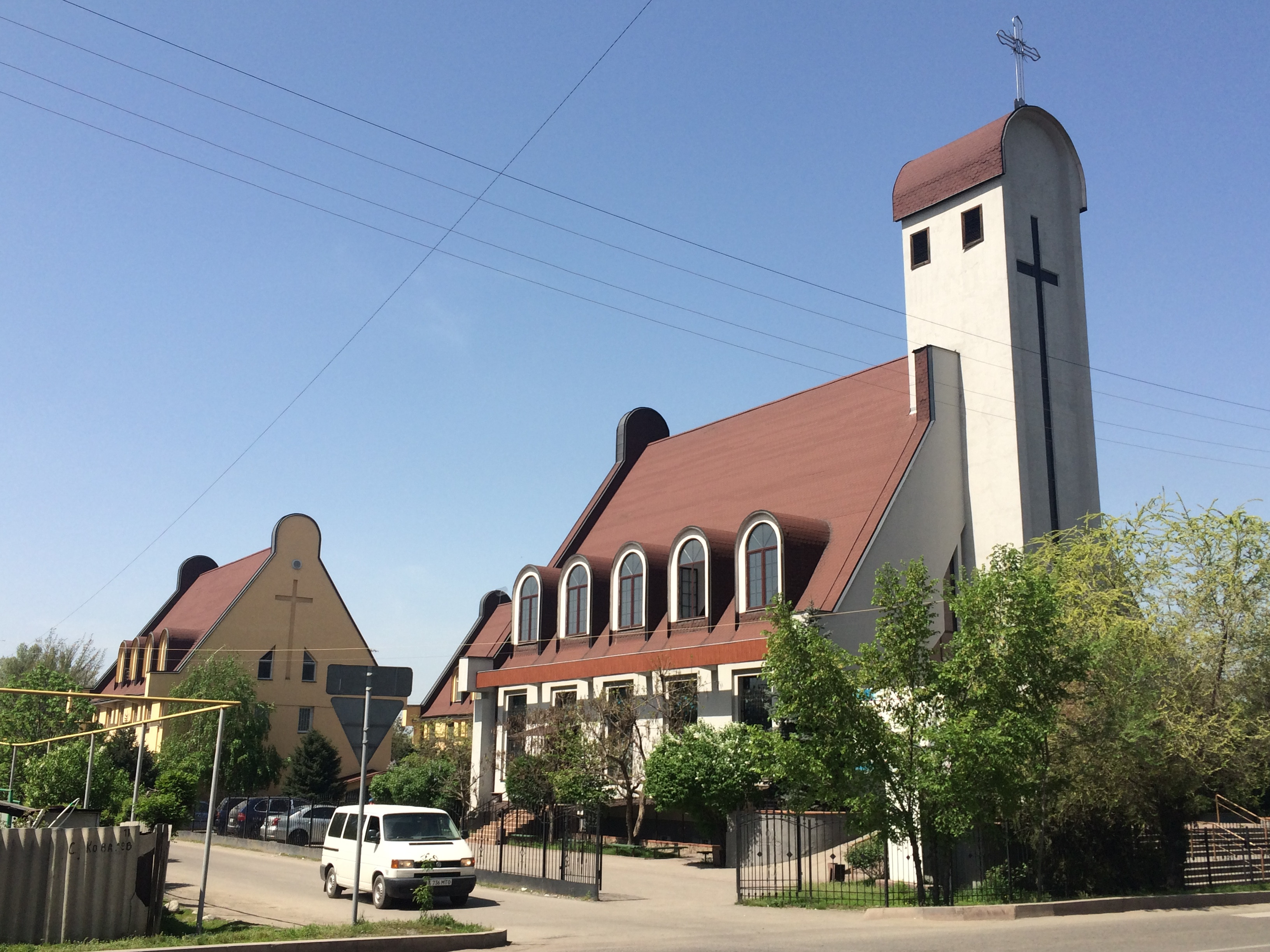
- Cathedral of the Holy Trinity in Almaty

Location
- Country: Kazakhstan
- Ecclesiastical province: Mary Most Holy in Astana
- Metropolitan: Mary Most Holy in Astana

Statistics
- Area: 711,600 km^{2} (274,800 sq mi)
- Population: Total; Catholics: (as of 2013); 6,400,000; 50,000 (0.8%)

Information
- Denomination: Catholic Church
- Sui iuris church: Latin Church
- Rite: Roman Rite
- Cathedral: Cathedral of the Holy Trinity in Almaty

Current leadership
- Pope: Leo XIV
- Bishop: José Luís Mumbiela Sierra
- Metropolitan Archbishop: Tomasz Peta

Map
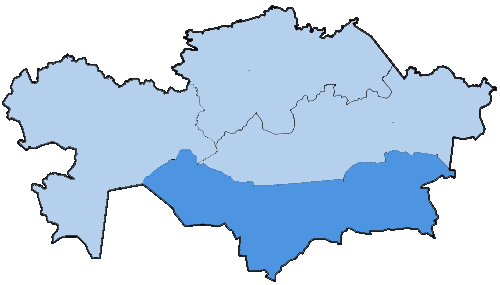

The Catholic Diocese of Most Holy Trinity in Almaty (Latin: Sanctissimae Trinitatis in Almata) is a diocese located within the city of Almaty in the ecclesiastical province of Mary Most Holy in Astana in Kazakhstan.

== History ==
- July 7, 1999: Established as Apostolic Administration of Almaty from the Apostolic Administration of Kazakhstan
- May 17, 2003: Promoted as Diocese of Most Holy Trinity in Almaty

== Leadership ==
- Apostolic Administrators of Almaty (Roman rite)
  - Bishop Henry Theophilus Howaniec, O.F.M. (July 7, 1999 – May 17, 2003)
- Bishops of Most Holy Trinity in Almaty (Roman rite)
  - Bishop Henry Theophilus Howaniec, O.F.M. (May 17, 2003 – March 5, 2011)
  - Bishop José Luís Mumbiela Sierra (since March 5, 2011)

== See also ==
- Catholic Church in Kazakhstan

== Sources ==
- GCatholic.org
- Catholic Hierarchy
- The Catholic Church in Kazakhstan
