= Gondar funeral attack =

2022 incident in Ethiopia

- Location: Gondar, Amhara Region, Ethiopia
- Date: 26 April 2022
- Target: Mourners in Muslim funeral
- Deaths: 21 people (according to Addis Ababa Islamic Affair's High Council)
- Injuries: 15
- Perpetrator: Under investigation per government response

The Gondar funeral attack took place on 26 April 2022 when a group of unidentified armed men attacked the mourners at the funeral of chieftain Sheik Kamal Legas in Gondar mosque, killing at least 21 people, according to Addis Ababa Islamic Affair's High Council. The Islamic Affairs Council of Amhara decried the event as a "massacre" alleged by heavily armed "extremist Christians."

== Event ==
The men ambushed the crowd and threw an explosive device, killing three and wounding five others. Another victim later died of injuries. The spokesperson for Amhara Region Government said the incident was under investigation. One source noted that 15 people were injured. It was unclear how many had been shot. According to Orthodox Church in Silte, three churches were burned in southern Ethiopia in what appeared to be retaliation. The government announced 370 people were apprehended over the incident.

== Reactions ==
Muslim scholar Ustaz Bediru Hussien wrote, "The number of our brothers killed in Gonder has risen to three. Mosques are currently being attacked; We have heard from residents that homes are being looted in broad daylight and Muslim property is being destroyed. If the state does not respond immediately to the government or the federal government intervenes, it will not be easy to stop."

The Addis Ababa Islamic Affairs High Council denounced it as a "planned massacre", stating that mosques and the Quran were burned, women raped and Muslim properties destroyed. The Amhara Regional State Islamic Affair Council condemned the attack and demanded justice. The Islamic Affairs Council of Amhara decried the event as "massacre" alleged by heavily armed "extremist Christians."

Thousands of Muslims in Addis Ababa protested near Grand Anwar Mosque, demanding justice. Desalegn Tasew, the head of Amhara State Peace and Security Bureau blamed the violence on perpetrators who allegedly collected rocks from the Orthodox Church next to the mosque.
