= Catholic Church in Kyrgyzstan =

The Catholic Church in Kyrgyzstan is part of the worldwide Catholic Church, under the spiritual leadership of the Pope in Rome.

== Demographics ==
There were approximately 670 Catholics in the country in 2020 with three parishes (Bishkek, Talas, and Jalal-Abad) and Mass centers in other towns and villages. Jesuit priest Anthony Corcoran of the USA Central and Southern Province of the Society of Jesus is the current Apostolic Administrator, taking over after Janez Mihelčič on August 29, 2017. In 2020, the country was served by five Jesuit and two diocesan priests, as well as seven Franciscan sisters. Most of the Catholics in the country are the descendants of Germans, Poles and other European ethnic groups who were deported to Central Asia by Joseph Stalin in the 1930s and 1940s.

== History ==
The Catholics are mentioned in this region since 14th century, mainly on the territory of today's Kazakhstan. The Catholic missionaries came in Kyrgyzstan mainly from China, till turn of 19th and 20th centuries. Since 1918 to 1930, the area of Kyrgyzstan came under the parish of Tashkent. In 1937, there started the persecution of Catholic Church, the churches were destroyed and all priests were deported or executed. In that time, because of mass deportations into Central Asia (that had no parallel even in tsar era), came to influx of Catholics from Volga area, Ukraine, Poland and Baltic Sea area.

The first Catholic church in the country was built in 1969 by faithful of German descent, and was also granted legal recognition that same year. A second floor was built in 1981 because of community growth.

=== 1991 to the present ===
After Kyrgyzstan's independence from the Soviet Union in 1991, the country became part of the Apostolic Administration for Central Asia based in Karaganda, Kazakhstan. In 1997, Pope John Paul II established the sui-juris Catholic Mission for Kyrgyzstan under the care of the Jesuit religious order. In 2006, it was raised to an Apostolic Administration and Nikolaus Messmer was named the country's first Catholic bishop. The Vatican has established diplomatic relations with Kyrgyzstan. The church operated relatively freely in the country in 2001, though it has had registration problems with the state committee on religious affairs. Priests have difficulty working in the country as many are foreigners and must get permits or student visas. Long-distance travel is common for the few priests in the country to visit the large number of small Catholic communities in the country. Ecumenical relations with other Christian churches are positive, especially at the local level.

== See also ==
- Religion in Kyrgyzstan
- Christianity in Kyrgyzstan
- Apostolic Administration of Kyrgyzstan
