= Nikolaus Messmer =

Nikolaus Messmer S.J.
- Apostolic Administrator of Kyrgyzstan
- Church: Catholic Church
- See: Apostolic Administration of Kyrgyzstan
- In office: 18 March 2006 – 18 July 2016
- Predecessor: Aleksandr Kan
- Successor: Janez Mihelčič
- Other post: Titular Bishop of Carmeiano (2006-2016)

Orders
- Ordination: 28 May 1989
- Consecration: 2 June 2006 by Angelo Sodano

Personal details
- Born: 19 December 1954 Karaganda, Kazakh SSR, Soviet Union
- Died: 18 July 2016 (aged 61) Bishkek, Kyrgyzstan

Bishop Nikolaus Messmer, S.J. (19 December 1954 − 18 July 2016) was a Roman Catholic prelate who served as the titular bishop of Carmeiano and the first Apostolic Administrator of the Apostolic Administration of Kyrgyzstan from 2006 until his death in 2016.

== History ==
Bishop Messmer was born in Karaganda, Kazakh SSR in a family of German descent. At a young age he joined the Society of Jesus and was ordained as priest on 28 May 1989 and he was sent to serve in Kyrgyzstan. He was appointed Apostolic Administrator of the new elevated Apostolic Administration of Kyrgyzstan by Pope Benedict XVI on 18 March 2006.

=== Death ===
Messmer died on 18 July 2016 in Bishkek at the age of 61.
