= Henry Theophilus Howaniec =

American Roman Catholic bishop (1931–2018)

Henry Theophilus Howaniec OFM
- Bishop of Most Holy Trinity in Almaty
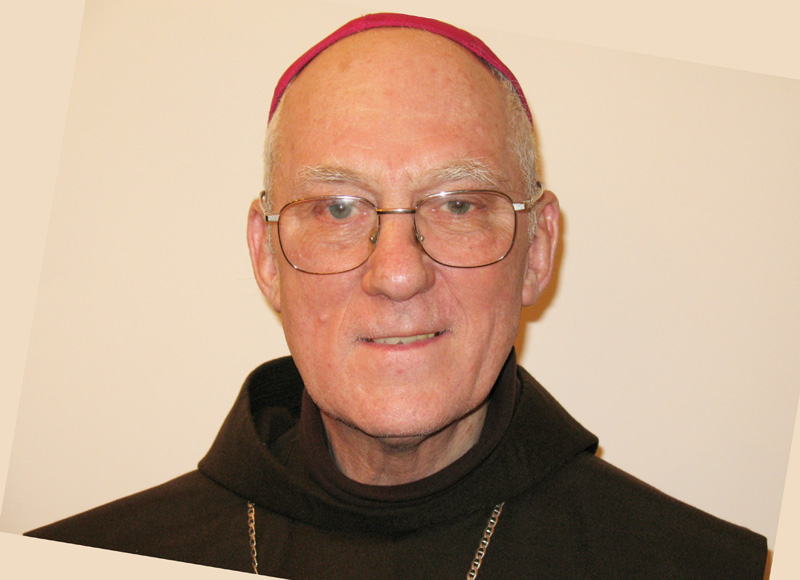
- Church: Catholic Church
- Diocese: Diocese of Most Holy Trinity in Almaty
- In office: 7 July 1999 – 5 March 2011
- Predecessor: Administration established
- Successor: José Luis Mumbiela Sierra
- Previous post: Titular Bishop of Acholla (2000-2003)

Orders
- Ordination: 14 June 1956 by Vincentas Brizgys
- Consecration: 26 November 2000 by Marian Oleś

Personal details
- Born: February 14, 1934 Chicago, Illinois, United States
- Died: March 30, 2018 (aged 84) Milwaukee, Wisconsin, United States

Henry Theophilus Howaniec (14 February 1931 – 30 March 2018) was a Roman Catholic bishop.

Howaniec was born in Chicago, Illinois and ordained to the priesthood, in West Chicago, Illinois on June 14, 1956, for the Franciscan Fathers of the Assumption. He was ordained a bishop on November 26, 2000, and then served as bishop of the Catholic Diocese of Most Holy Trinity in Almaty, Kazakhstan until 2011. Howaniec died in Milwaukee, Wisconsin.
