= Religion in Tajikistan =

Religion in Tajikistan (Pew Research Center 2020)
1. Islam (98.9%)
2. Christianity (1.00%)
3. Other (0.10%)

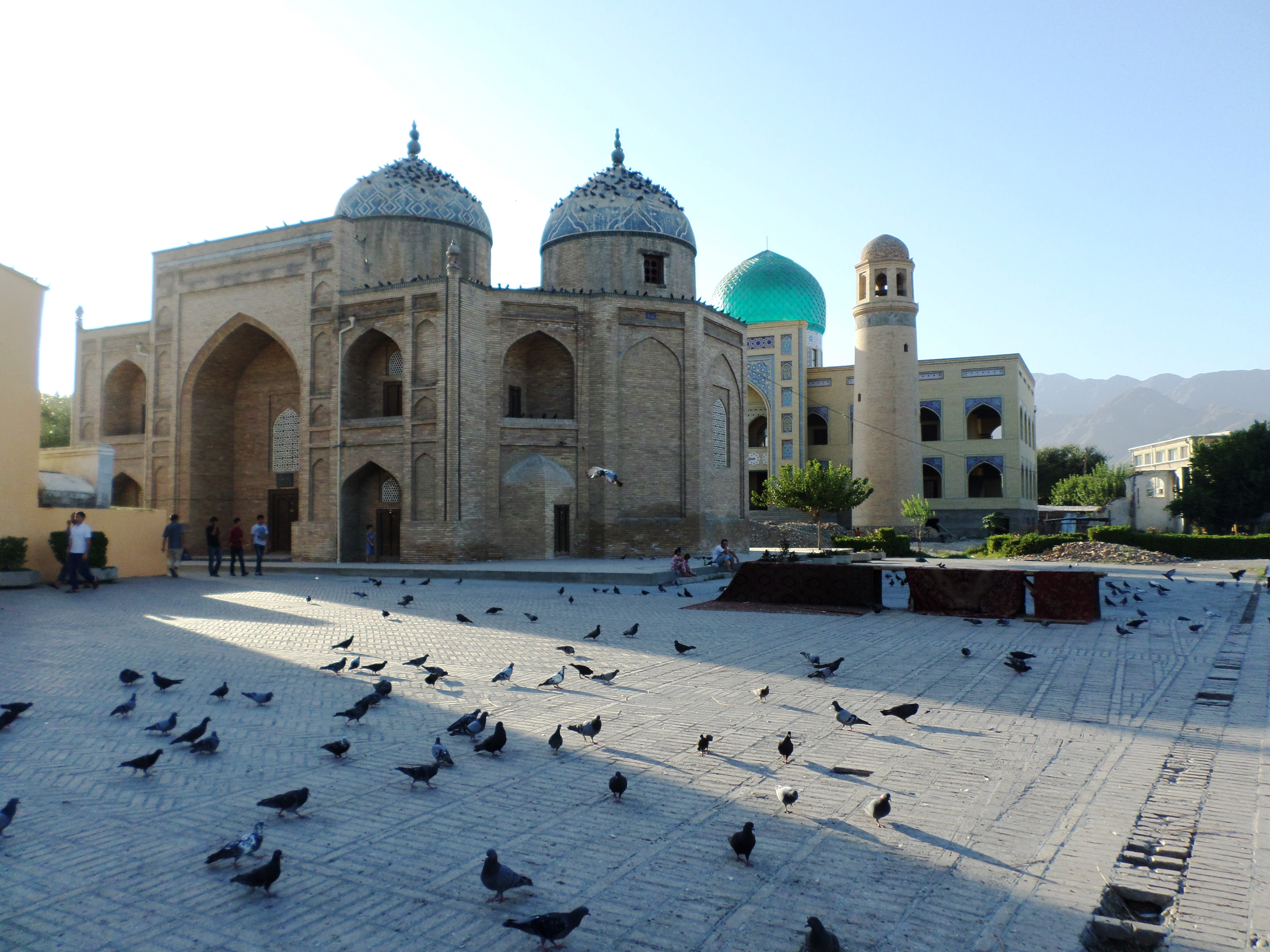
The Sheikh Muslihiddin Mosque in Khujand

Islam is the predominant religion in Tajikistan.

Islam was brought to the region by the Arabs in the 7th century. Since that time, it has become an integral part of Tajik culture. Tajikistan is a secular country, but the post-Soviet era has seen a marked increase in religious practice in the country. The majority of Tajikistan's Muslims adhere to the Sunni branch of Islam, and a smaller group (mostly in Gorno-Badakhshan in the east) belong to the Shia branch of Islam. The Russian Orthodox faith is the most widely practiced of other religions, although the Russian community shrank significantly in the early 1990s. Some other small Christian groups now enjoy relative freedom of worship. Tajikistan also has a small Jewish community.

== Islam ==
Sunni Islam is, by far, the most widely practiced religion in Tajikistan. According to academics in 2022, the population of Tajikistan is 96% Muslim (mainly Hanafi Sunni with a small population of Ismaili Shia). The Sunni branch of Islam has a 1,200-year-old tradition among the sedentary population of Central Asia, including the Tajiks with some Sufi orders. A small minority group, the Pamiris, are members of a much smaller denomination of Shia Islam, Ismailism, which first won adherents in Central Asia in the early 10th century. Despite persecution, Ismailism has survived in the remote Pamir Mountains.

=== During the Soviet era ===
During the course of seven decades of political control, Soviet policy makers were unable to eradicate the Islamic tradition, despite repeated attempts to do so. The harshest of the Soviet anti-Islamic campaigns occurred from the late 1920s to the late 1930s as part of a Union-wide drive against religion in general. In this period, many Muslim functionaries were killed, and religious instruction and observance were curtailed sharply. After the German invasion of the Soviet Union in 1941, official policy toward Islam moderated. One of the ensuing changes was the establishment in 1943 of an officially sanctioned Islamic hierarchy for Central Asia, the Spiritual Administration of the Muslims of Central Asia and Kazakhstan. Together with three similar organizations for other regions of the Soviet Union having large Muslim populations, this administration was controlled by the Kremlin, which required loyalty from religious officials. Although its administrative personnel and structure were inadequate to serve the needs of the Muslim inhabitants of the region, the administration made possible the legal existence of some Islamic institutions, as well as the activities of religious functionaries, a small number of mosques, and religious instruction at two seminaries in Uzbekistan.

In the early 1960s, the Khrushchev regime escalated anti-Islamic propaganda. Then, on several occasions in the 1970s and 1980s, the Kremlin leadership called for renewed efforts to combat religion, including Islam. Typically, such campaigns included conversion of mosques to secular use; attempts to re-identify traditional Islamic-linked customs with nationalism rather than religion; and propaganda linking Islam to backwardness, superstition, and bigotry. Official hostility toward Islam grew in 1979 with Soviet military involvement in nearby Afghanistan and the increasing assertiveness of Islamic revivalists in several countries. From that time through the early post-Soviet era, some officials in Moscow and in Tajikistan warned of an extremist Islamic menace, often on the basis of limited or distorted evidence. Despite all these efforts, Islam remained an important part of the identity of the Tajiks and other Muslim peoples of Tajikistan through the end of the Soviet era and the first years of independence.

Identification with Islam as an integral part of life is shared by urban and rural, old and young, and educated and uneducated Tajiks. The role that the faith plays in the lives of individuals varies considerably, however. For some Tajiks, Islam is more important as an intrinsic part of their cultural heritage than as a religion in the usual sense, and some Tajiks are not religious at all.

In any case, Tajiks have disproved the standard Soviet assertion that the urbanized industrial labor force and the educated population had little to do with a "remnant of a bygone era" such as Islam. A noteworthy development in the late Soviet and early independence eras was increased interest, especially among young people, in the substance of Islamic doctrine. In the post-Soviet era, Islam became an important element in the nationalist arguments of certain Tajik intellectuals.

Islam survived in Tajikistan in widely varied forms because of the strength of an indigenous folk Islam quite apart from the Soviet-sanctioned Islamic administration. Long before the Soviet era, rural Central Asians, including inhabitants of what became Tajikistan, had access to their own holy places. There were also small, local religious schools and individuals within their communities who were venerated for religious knowledge and piety. These elements sustained religion in the countryside, independent of outside events. Under Soviet regimes, Tajiks used the substantial remainder of this rural, popular Islam to continue at least some aspects of the teaching and practice of their faith after the activities of urban-based Islamic institutions were curtailed. Folk Islam also played an important role in the survival of Islam among the urban population. One form of this popular Islam is Sufism—often described as Islamic mysticism and practiced by individuals in a variety of ways. The most important form of Sufism in Tajikistan is the Naqshbandiyya, a Sufi order with followers as far away as India and Malaysia. Besides Sufism, other forms of popular Islam are associated with local cults and holy places or with individuals whose knowledge or personal qualities have made them influential.

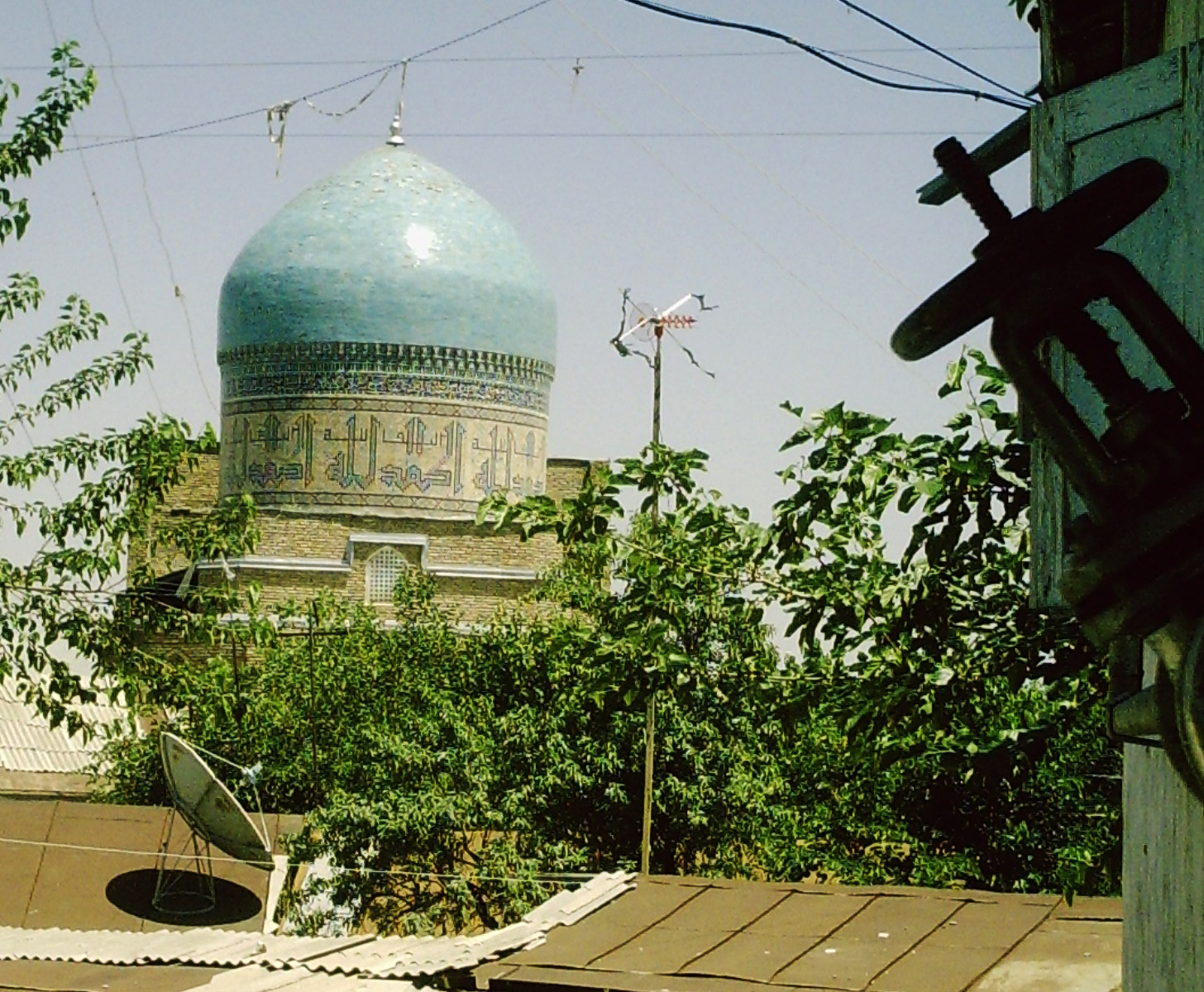
A madrassa in Istarawshan.

By late 1989, the Gorbachev regime's increased tolerance of religion began to affect the practices of Islam and Russian Orthodoxy. Religious instruction increased. New mosques opened. Religious observance became more open, and participation increased. New Islamic spokesmen emerged in Tajikistan and elsewhere in Central Asia. The authority of the official, Tashkent-based Muslim Board of Central Asia crumbled in Tajikistan. Tajikistan acquired its own seminary in Dushanbe, ending its reliance on the administration's two seminaries in Uzbekistan.

By 1990 the Muslim Board's chief official in Dushanbe, the senior qadi, Hajji Akbar Turajonzoda (in office 1988-92), had become an independent public figure with a broad following. In the factional political battle that followed independence, Turajonzoda criticized the communist hard-liners and supported political reform and official recognition of the importance of Islam in Tajikistani society. At the same time, he repeatedly denied hard-liners' accusations that he sought the establishment of an Islamic government in Tajikistan. After the hard-liners' victory in the civil war at the end of 1992, Turajonzoda fled Dushanbe and was charged with treason.

Muslims in Tajikistan also organized politically in the early 1990s. In 1990, as citizens in many parts of the Soviet Union were forming their own civic organizations, Muslims from various parts of the union organized the Islamic Rebirth Party. By the early 1990s, the growth of mass political involvement among Central Asian Muslims led all political parties—including the Communist Party of Tajikistan—to take into account the Muslim heritage of the vast majority of Tajikistan's inhabitants.

Islam also played a key political role for the regime in power in the early 1990s. The communist old guard evoked domestic and international fears that fundamentalist Muslims would destabilize the Tajikistani government when that message was expedient in fortifying the hard-liners' position against opposition forces in the civil war. However, the Nabiyev regime also was willing to represent itself as an ally of Iran's Islamic republic while depicting the Tajik opposition as unfaithful Muslims.

=== Recent developments ===
After the Soviet era, the Tajik government closed hundreds of unregistered mosques, drawing locals to believe that the crackdown is actually against the religion of Islam. According to reports, some mosques have been destroyed while others have been converted into beauty parlors. Some have speculated that the crackdown is a result of governmental concerns of Mosques being "unsafe," or that the Imams may not act "responsible".

In 2009, the Assembly of Representatives attempted to make the Hanafi school of Sunni Islam the official religion in Tajikistan, but this measure failed. Tajikistan also marked 2009 as the year to commemorate the Sunni Muslim jurist Abu Hanifa, as the nation hosted an international symposium that drew scientific and religious leaders. The construction of one of the largest mosques in the world, funded by Qatar, was announced in October 2009. The mosque is planned to be built in Dushanbe and construction is said to be completed by 2014. In 2010, Tajikistan hosted a session of the Organisation of the Islamic Conference with delegations from 56 members states gathering at Dushanbe.

In April 2020 as a part of efforts to prevent a coronavirus pandemic in Tajikistan, although there were no confirmed cases in Tajikistan, President Rahmon urged Muslims in the country to forego fasting for Ramadan saying that fasting would make people more susceptible to infectious disease.

== Christianity ==
The next largest religious community is Russian Orthodox as practiced by the Russian minorities of Tajikistan. A cathedral in Dushanbe, St. Nicholas, serves the Orthodox community. By the end of the Soviet era, Tajikistan also was home to small numbers of people belonging to other Christian denominations, including Roman Catholics (originally most of them were from German origins, but also Tajiks), Seventh-Day Adventists, and Baptists. There also was a small Armenian minority, most of whose members belonged historically to the Armenian Apostolic (Gregorian) Church.

=== Roman Catholicism ===
The territory of Tajikistan forms a mission sui iuris. According to the most recent figures in the Annuario Pontificio, there are 326 Catholics in Tajikistan on a population of over 7.1 million. There are three parishes in Tajikistan.

== Other religions ==
Other religious groups included Zoroastrians, Buddhists and small numbers of Jews and Baha'is. The number of adherents to these minority religions probably decreased sharply in the 1990s because of the wave of emigration from Tajikistan in the early independence period.

== Freedom of religion ==
The Constitution provides for the right to adhere to any or no religion.

The status of respect for religious freedom eroded during recent years. Government policies reflected a concern about Islamic extremism, a concern shared by much of the general population. The Government actively monitored the activities of religious institutions to keep them from becoming overtly political. There were no closures of officially registered mosques, although the Government closed several unregistered mosques, prayer rooms, and madrassahs, and made the registration process to establish new mosques difficult. A Ministry of Education policy prohibited girls from wearing the hijab at public schools. The Government used the registration process to hinder some organizations' religious activity. Some religious organizations and individuals faced harassment, temporary detention, and interrogation by government authorities.

As of 2013, Tajikistan was unique in the world because it was illegal for people under age 18 to practice religion publicly, which includes attending mosques. Women are not allowed by the government to enter certain mosques. Additionally, the government places strict limits on hajj visits and reportedly harasses devotees by forcibly shaving their beards after rounding them up.

In 2023, the country was scored zero out of 4 for religious freedom.

== See also ==
- Protestantism in Tajikistan
- Demographics of Tajikistan
