= Adelio Dell'Oro =

Italian-born Catholic Bishop

The Most Reverend Adelio Dell'Oro
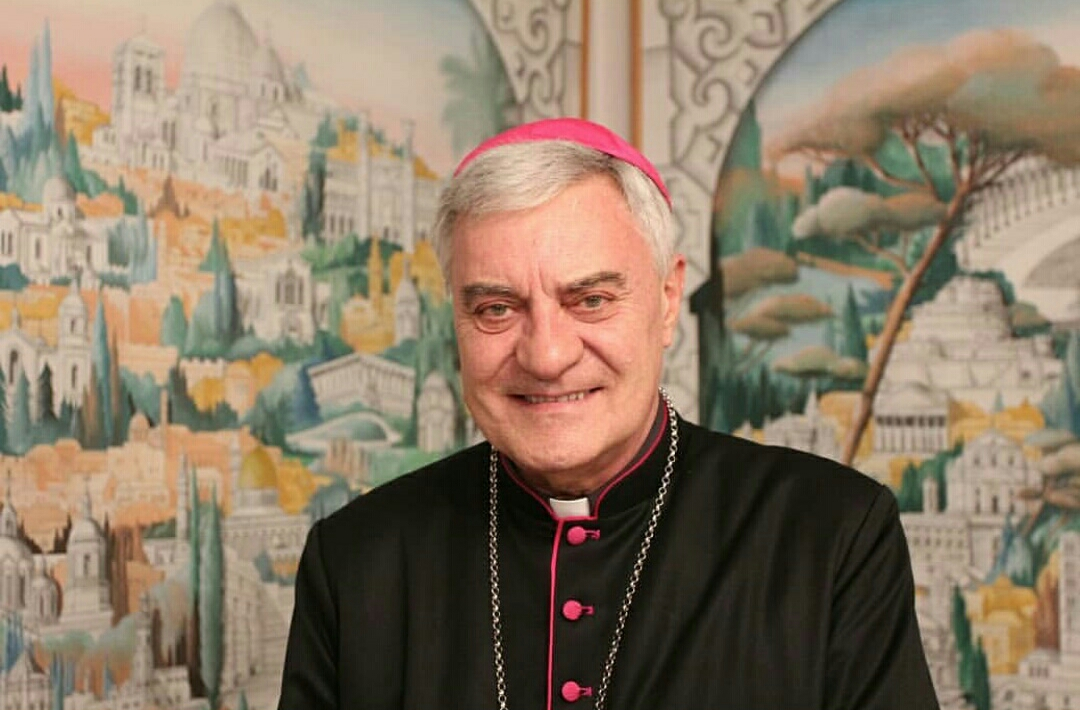
- Diocese: Diocese of Karaganda
- Installed: 7 December 2012
- Predecessor: Janusz Kaleta
- Successor: Piotr Pytlowany
- Previous post: Apostolic administrator of Atyrau

Orders
- Ordination: 28 June 1972
- Consecration: 2 March 2013

Personal details
- Born: 31 July 1948 (age 78) Milan, Italy
- Denomination: Christian (Catholic)
- Occupation: Cleric
- Motto: Unum omnia loquuntur (All speak one)
- Coat of arms: Adelio Dell'Oro's coat of arms

Adelio Dell'Oro (born 31 July 1948) is the Italian-born retired Catholic Bishop of Karaganda, Kazakhstan.

== Biography ==
=== Early life and education ===
Born on 31 July 1948 in Milan, Italy. His first cousin is Italo Dell'Oro, who is now an Auxiliary Bishop in the Archdiocese of Galveston-Houston. In 1959 he entered the minor seminary in Milan. In 1967 he went to complete his classical studies at the Northern Italian theological faculties.

=== Ministry ===
He was ordained a priest for the Archdiocese of Milan by Cardinal Giovanni Colombo on 28 June 1972. He served as the Vicar of St Andrea's Parish in Milan until 1983. He then served as the Vicar of St Maria Assunta parish in Buccinasco until 1997. Meanwhile, Dell'Oro was a teacher of the religion in secondary schools and technical institutes from 1974 to 1997.

==== Initial Service in Kazakhstan ====
In 1997, he was transferred to Kazakhstan where he became the director of the Kazakhstani branch of Caritas from 1997 to 2007. He also served as a priest at Vishniovka-Ashaly, collaborator of the apostolic nunciature and teacher of theology at the major seminary of Karaganda from 2007 to 2009. He became the spiritual director of the inter-diocesan Mary the Mother of the Church seminary in Karaganda.

==== Return to Italy ====
In 2009, he returned to Italy where he served the Parish of San Zeno in Cambiago. He was appointed vice-rector of the college at Guastalla Monza and Diocesan Assistant of Communion and Liberation from 2010 to 2012.

==== Appointment as Bishop and Return to Kazakhstan ====
Styles of Adelio Dell'Oro
- Reference style: The Most Reverend
- Spoken style: Your Grace
- Religious style: Bishop

On the Solemnity of St Ambrose, 7 December 2012, Pope Benedict XVI appointed Dell'Oro Apostolic Administrator of Atyrau, Kazakhstan (upon the resignation of Bishop Janusz Kaleta) and Titular Bishop of Castulo.

He received his episcopal ordination on 2 March 2013 in the cathedral of Milan by the hands of Cardinal Angelo Scola, Archbishop of Milan with Cardinal Dionigi Tettamanzi, Archbishop Emeritus of Milan, and Archbishop Tomasz Peta of Astana as co-consecrators. He arrived in Atyrau on 21 April.

On 31 January 2015, Dell'Oro was appointed Bishop of Karaganda by Pope Francis although he remained as Apostolic Administrator of Atyrau until 16 May.

On 10 August 2026, the Vatican announced that Pope Leo had accepted Dell'Oro's resignation as bishop of Karaganda and appointed Piotr Pytlowany to succeed him.

=== Languages Spoken ===
In addition to his native Italian Dell'Oro speaks Russian and English. He also has a working knowledge of Latin and Kazakh.

Preceded by Bishop Janusz Kaleta	Bishop of Karaganda; 31 January 2015 – 10 August 2026	Succeeded by Piotr Pytlowany

Preceded by Bishop Janusz Kaleta	Apostolic Administrator of Atyrau; 7 December 2012 – 16 May 2015	Succeeded by Dariusz Buras
