= Christianity in Tajikistan =

Christianity is a minority religion in Tajikistan.

According to the 2020 census, it is the second largest religion in the country behind Islam. This is 0.69% of the population, or approximately 50,000 people.

== Denominations ==
The World Christian Encyclopedia, Second edition, Volume 1, states the Russian Orthodox Church as the largest Church. The Lutheran Church has one congregation in Dushanbe and smaller groups in few other places. The World Christian Encyclopedia also mentions the presence of the Ukrainian Orthodox Church. There were about 100 Catholics in the country in 2020.

There are at least five registered organizations of Baptists. There is at least one congregation of Korean Protestants. There are foreign Christian missions in Tajikistan. In the constitution, freedom of religion is mentioned. Religious communities must be registered by the Committee on Religious Affairs under the Council of Ministers. It is legal to distribute Christian literature.

== Restriction ==
In early 2009 Tajikistan enacted a new law on religious practice which essentially limits worship to state-sanctioned forms. The new law imposes censorship on religious literature and restricts performing rituals to state-approved venues. It makes it harder for new religious communities to get registration. This law has been used to ban the Christian aid group.

== Persecutions ==
In recent years, several incidents of violence and discrimination against the Christian minority have been reported. These included the bombing of a Christian church in Dushanbe in 2000, killing 10 and wounding many more. According to reports, some of the surviving victims later faced harassment by the police. In 2012, a young man dressed as Father Frost was stabbed to death in Dushanbe by a crowd shouting "You infidel!". The murder was motivated by religious hatred, according to the Tajik police.

In spite of opposition in relation to conversion from Islam to Christianity, a 2015 study estimates some 2,600 Christians with Muslim backgrounds reside in the country.

== See also ==
- Roman Catholicism in Tajikistan
- Religion in Tajikistan
- Protestantism in Tajikistan
