= José Luis Mumbiela Sierra =

Catholic Bishop of Almaty

- Bishop of Most Holy Trinity in Almaty
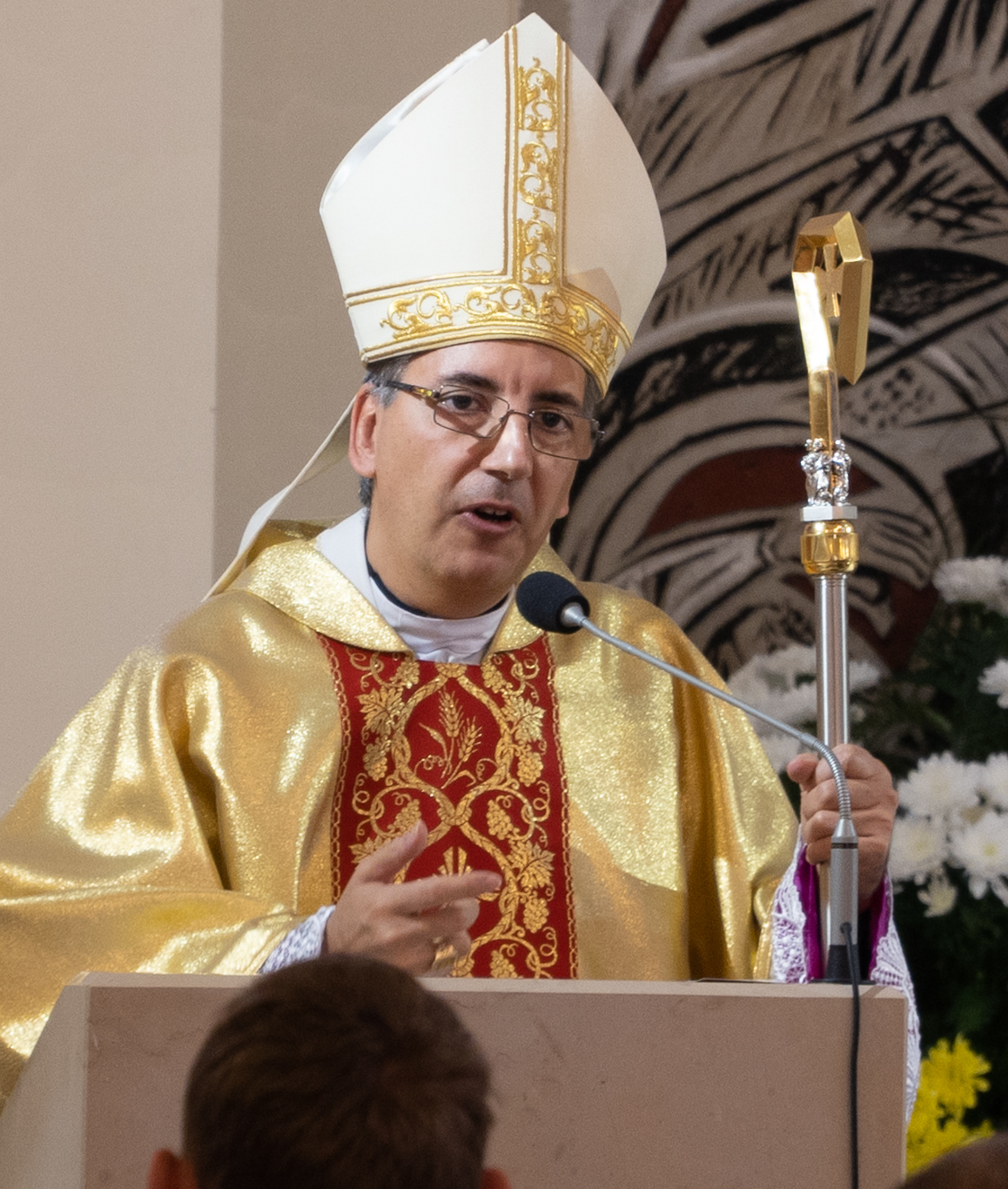
- Church: Catholic Church
- Diocese: Diocese of Most Holy Trinity in Almaty
- Appointed: 5 March 2011
- Predecessor: Henry Theophilus Howaniec

Orders
- Ordination: 25 June 1995
- Consecration: 8 May 2011 by Miguel Maury Buendía

Personal details
- Born: 27 May 1969 (age 56) Monzón, Province of Huesca, Spanish State
- Coat of arms

José Luis Mumbiela Sierra (born 27 May 1969) is a Spanish prelate of the Roman Catholic Church who has been bishop of the Diocese of Holy Trinity in Almaty in Kazakhstan since 2011.

== Biography ==
Mumbiela was born on 27 May 1969 in Monzón, Spain. He read studied theology ant the University of Navarre from 1987 to 1992 and received his licentiate in theology in 1994. and obtained a degree in 1994 from the University of Navarra, in Spain. He was ordained a priest on 25 June 1995 at the Cathedral of La Seu Vella in Lleida. He was parish vicar in Fraga from 1995 to 1998. He completed his doctorate on 30 June 1997. He later said he had not considered missionary work until he learned that Pope John Paul II had appealed for priests to work in Kazakhstan and he volunteered.

He arrived in Kazakhstan as a fidei donum priest on 28 February 1998 and worked first in Shymkent. He then served as prefect of studies and vice rector of the interdiocesan seminary in Karaganda, becoming rector on 16 June 2007. On 5 March 2011, Pope Benedict XVI appointed him bishop of the Holy Trinity Diocese in Almaty.

On 8 May 2011, Mumbiela received his episcopal ordination from Archbishop Miguel Maury Buendía, Apostolic Nuncio to Kazakhstan.

In January 2022, Mumbiela described the generational and cultural change his diocese was experiencing. With the aging of the immigrant population that often worshipped in their native languages, Russian and Kazakh were being used more frequently. He said his priests were accommodating themselves to Kazakh, once identified with the uneducated. He said this was critical for evangelization and to enable native clergy to assume leadership positions in the country's multi-ethnic Church.

On 2 May 2022, the newly created Catholic Bishops’ Conference of Central Asia elected Mumbiela to a four-year term as its first president. The Conference includes bishops and church delegates from Kazakhstan, Kyrgyzstan, Tajikistan, Turkmenistan, Uzbekistan, Mongolia, and Afghanistan.

Following Pope Francis' visit to Kazakhstan]] to participate in an interfaith congress in September 2023, Mumbiela said he could identify impact on every level, from local enthusiasm and conversions to improved cooperation with government agencies. He also described success in relations with other faith communities, who were impressed by Francis' tributes to their traditions and his appreciation for the contributions of local culture.
