= List of churches in the Diocese of San Jose in California =

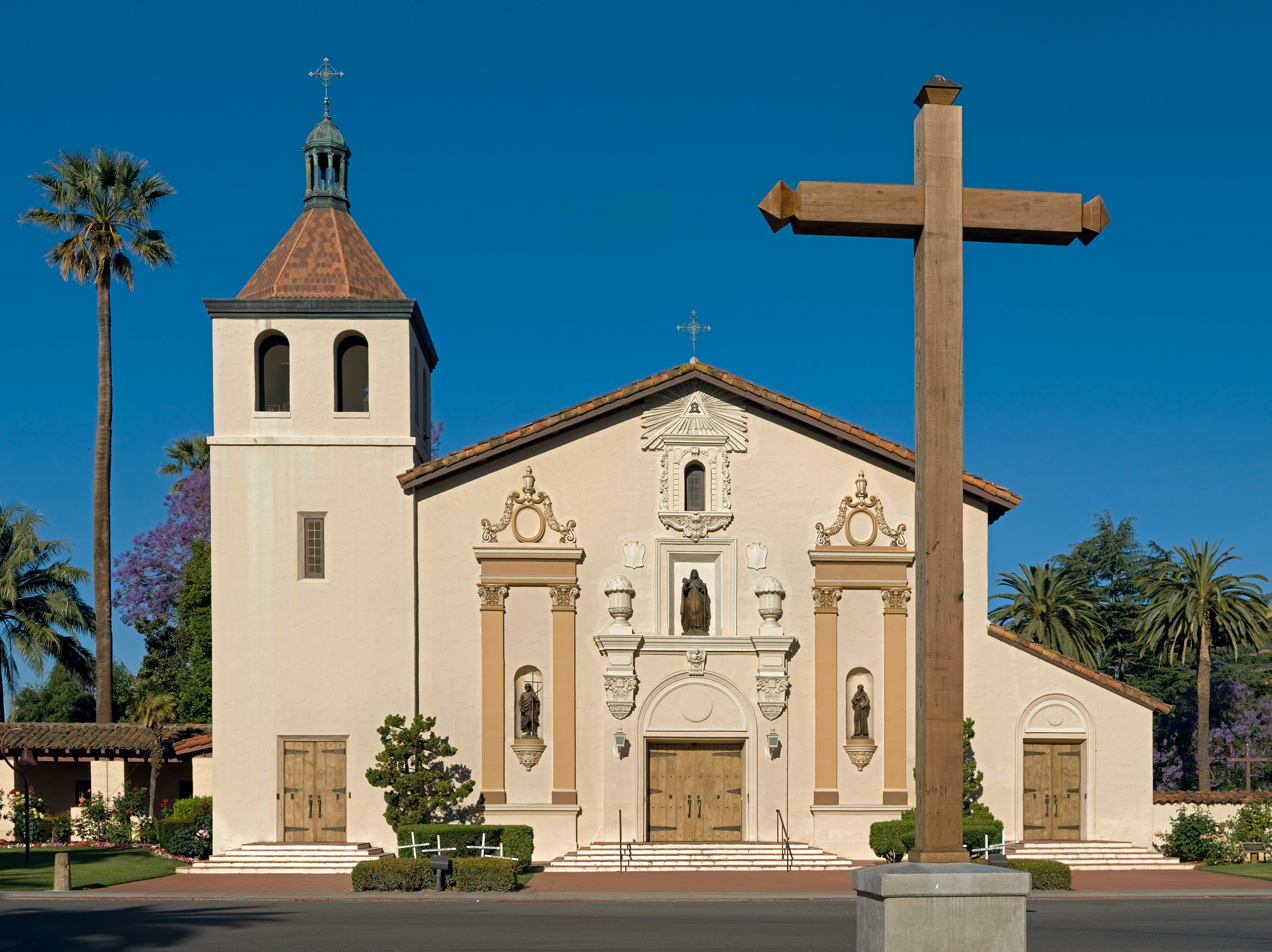
Mission Santa Clara de Asís, founded in 1777

This is a list of current and former Roman Catholic churches in the Roman Catholic Diocese of San Jose in California. The diocese comprises Santa Clara County, California and includes approximately 53 churches divided for administrative purposes into six deaneries.

The Cathedral Basilica of St. Joseph in downtown San Jose is the cathedral church of the diocese. The diocese also includes Mission Santa Clara de Asís, a Spanish mission founded in 1777 and located on the campus of Santa Clara University.

== Deanery 2: Northwest (Los Altos, Mountain View, Palo Alto) ==
| Name | Image | Location | Description/Notes |
|---|---|---|---|
| Catholic Community at Stanford | | 520 Lasuen Mall #305, Stanford | |
| St. Athanasius | | 60 North Rengstorff Ave, Mountain View | |
| St. Joseph | | 580 Hope St, Mountain View | |
| St. Nicholas | | 473 Lincoln Ave, Los Altos | |
| St. Simon | | 1860 Grant Rd, Los Altos | |
| St. Thomas Aquinas | | 3290 Middlefield Rd, Palo Alto | |
| St. William | | 611 S El Monte Rd, Los Altos | |

== Deanery 3: Central (San Jose, Santa Clara, Sunnyvale) ==
| Name | Image | Location | Description/Notes |
|---|---|---|---|
| Cathedral Basilica of St. Joseph | | 80 South Market St, San Jose | |
| Chinese Catholic Community | | 941 Lexington St, Santa Clara | |
| Church of the Resurrection | | 725 Cascade Dr, Sunnyvale | |
| Holy Korean Martyrs | | 1523 McLaughlin Ave, Sunnyvale | |
| Mission Santa Clara de Asís | | 500 El Camino Real, Santa Clara | |
| Our Mother of Perpetual Help | | 1298 Homestead Rd, Santa Clara | |
| St. Clare | | 725 Washington St, Santa Clara | |
| St. Cyprian | | 195 Leota Ave, Sunnyvale | |
| St. Justin | | 2655 Homestead Rd, Santa Clara | |
| St. Lawrence, the Martyr | | 1971 Saint Lawrence Dr, Santa Clara | |
| St. Leo the Great | | 88 Race St, San Jose | |
| St. Martin | | 590 Central Ave, Sunnyvale | |

== Deanery 4: Northeast (Aviso, Milpitas, San Jose) ==
| Name | Image | Location | Description/Notes |
|---|---|---|---|
| Our Lady of Peace Church & Shrine to the Immaculate Heart of Mary | | 2800 Mission College Blvd, Santa Clara | |
| Our Lady Star of the Sea | | 1385 Michigan Ave, Alviso | |
| St. Elizabeth | | 750 Sequoia Dr, Milpitas | |
| St. John the Baptist | | 350 South Abel St, Milpitas | |
| St. Victor | | 3108 Sierra Rd, San Jose | |

== Deanery 5: South Central (Campbell, Cupertino, Los Gatos, Saratoga) ==
| Name | Image | Location | Description/Notes |
|---|---|---|---|
| Church of the Ascension | | 12033 Miller Ave, Saratoga | |
| Queen of Apostles | | 4911 Moorpark Ave, San Jose | |
| Sacred Heart | | 13716 Saratoga Ave, Saratoga | |
| St. Frances Cabrini | | 15333 Woodard Rd, San Jose | |
| St. Joseph of Cupertino | | 10110 North De Anza Blvd, Cupertino | |
| St. Lucy | | 2350 Winchester Blvd, Campbell | |
| St. Martin of Tours | | 200 O'Connor Dr, San Jose | |
| St. Mary of the Immaculate Conception | | 219 Bean Ave, Los Gatos | |
| St. Thomas of Canterbury | | 1522 McCoy Ave, San Jose | |

== Deanery 6: East (San Jose) ==
| Name | Image | Location | Description/Notes |
|---|---|---|---|
| Christ the King | | 5284 Monterey Rd, San Jose | |
| Five Wounds Portuguese National Church | | 1375 East Santa Clara St, San Jose | |
| Holy Cross | | 580 East Jackson St, San Jose | |
| Most Holy Trinity | | 2040 Nassau Dr, San Jose | |
| Our Lady of Guadalupe Church (San Jose, California) | | 2020 East San Antonio St, San Jose | |
| St. Brother Albert Chmielowski Polish Mission | | 10250 Clayton Rd, San Jose | |
| St. Francis of Assisi | | 5111 San Felipe Rd, San Jose | |
| St. John Vianney | | 4600 Hyland Ave, San Jose | |
| St. Maria Goretti | | 2980 Senter Rd, San Jose | |
| Our Lady of La Vang Parish, fka St. Patrick Proto-Cathedral | | 389 E Santa Clara St, San Jose | |

== Deanery 7: South (Gilroy, Morgan Hill, San Jose) ==
| Name | Image | Location | Description/Notes |
|---|---|---|---|
| Church of the Transfiguration | | 4325 Jarvis Ave, San Jose | |
| Holy Family | | 4848 Pearl Ave, San Jose | |
| Holy Spirit | | 1200 Redmond Ave, San Jose | |
| Sacred Heart of Jesus | | 325 Willow St, San Jose | |
| St. Anthony | | 20101 McKean Rd, San Jose | |
| St. Catherine of Alexandria | | 17400 Peak Ave, Morgan Hill | Parish founded 1909; current church opened 1967 |
| St. Christopher | | 1576 Curtner Ave, San Jose | |
| St. Julie Billiart | | 6410 Cottle Rd, San Jose | |
| St. Mary | | 11 First St, Gilroy | |
| St. Mary of the Assumption Croatian Mission | | 901 Lincoln Ave, San Jose | |
| Santa Teresa | | 794 Calero Ave, San Jose | |
