= Our Lady of Perpetual Help Church =

Our Lady of Perpetual Help Church, or variations with Parish or Catholic or otherwise, may refer to:

== Poland ==
- Church of Our Lady of Perpetual Help, Bydgoszcz, Poland
- Church of Our Lady of Perpetual Help, Tarnobrzeg, Poland
- Poznań Fara (or Basilica of Our Lady of Perpetual Help), Poznań, Poland

== United States ==
Our Lady of Perpetual Help Church, Oakland, New Jersey

- Our Lady of Perpetual Help Church (Altus, Arkansas)
- Oratory of Our Mother of Perpetual Help, Santa Clara, California
- Our Lady of Perpetual Help Parish (Quaker Hill, Connecticut)
- Our Lady of Perpetual Help Catholic Church in Ewa Beach, Oʻahu, Hawaii
- Our Lady of Perpetual Help (Glenview, Illinois)
- St. Mary of Perpetual Help Church (Chicago), Illinois
- Basilica and Shrine of Our Lady of Perpetual Help, Boston, Massachusetts
- Our Lady of Perpetual Help Parish (New Bedford, Massachusetts)
- Our Lady of Perpetual Help Roman Catholic Church, Cottage Grove, Oregon
- Basilica of Our Lady of Perpetual Help (Brooklyn), Brooklyn, New York
- Cathedral of Our Lady of Perpetual Help (Oklahoma City), Oklahoma
- Cathedral of Our Lady of Perpetual Help (Rapid City, South Dakota)

== Other ==
- Basilica of our Lady of Perpetual Help (Labrador City), Newfoundland and Labrador, Canada
- Kidane Mehret Cathedral, Asmara, Eritrea
- Our Lady of Perpetual Help Church, West Chalakudy, Kerala, India
- Our Mother of Perpetual Help Cathedral, Astana, Kazakhstan
- Our Lady of Perpetual Help Cathedral, Niamey, Niger
- Our Lady of Perpetual Help Parish Church, in Hagonoy, Bulacan, Philippines
- Baclaran Church (or National Shrine of Our Mother of Perpetual Help), Parañaque, Metro Manila, Philippines
- Our Lady of Perpetual Help Church, Petrozavodsk, Russia
- Pro-Cathedral of Our Lady of Perpetual Help, San Fernando, Trinidad
- Church of St. Mary of the Perpetual Assistance, Ternopil, Ukraine
- Our Lady of Perpetual Help Catholic Church, London, United Kingdom
- a church on the grounds of St Mary's Monastery, Kinnoull, Scotland, United Kingdom
- Nuestra Señora del Perpetuo Socorro y San Eugenio, Montevideo, Uruguay
- Our Lady of Perpetual Help Cathedral, El Vigia, Venezuela

== See also ==
- Cathedral of Our Lady of Perpetual Help (disambiguation)
