= Cathedral of Our Lady of Perpetual Help =

Cathedral of Our Lady of Perpetual Help may refer to:

- Cathedral of Our Lady of Perpetual Help (Rapid City, South Dakota), US
- Cathedral of Our Lady of Perpetual Help (Oklahoma City), US
- Cathedral of Our Lady of Perpetual Succour (Prizren), Kosovo
- Our Lady of Perpetual Help Cathedral, El Vigia, Venezuela
- Our Lady of Perpetual Help Cathedral, Niamey, Niger
- Kidane Mehret Cathedral, Asmara, Eritrea
- Pro-Cathedral of Our Lady of Perpetual Help, San Fernando, Trinidad

== See also ==
- Our Mother of Perpetual Help Cathedral, Astana, Kazakhstan
- Our Lady of Perpetual Help Church (disambiguation)
