= Sacred Heart Church (Saratoga, California) =

Roman Catholic church in the United States

Coordinates: 37°16′06″N 122°01′06″W

Sacred Heart Church is a Roman Catholic parish in Saratoga, California. The church is a part of the Diocese of San Jose in California. The current pastor of Sacred Heart is Father Gary Thomas. He has held the position since May 2006.

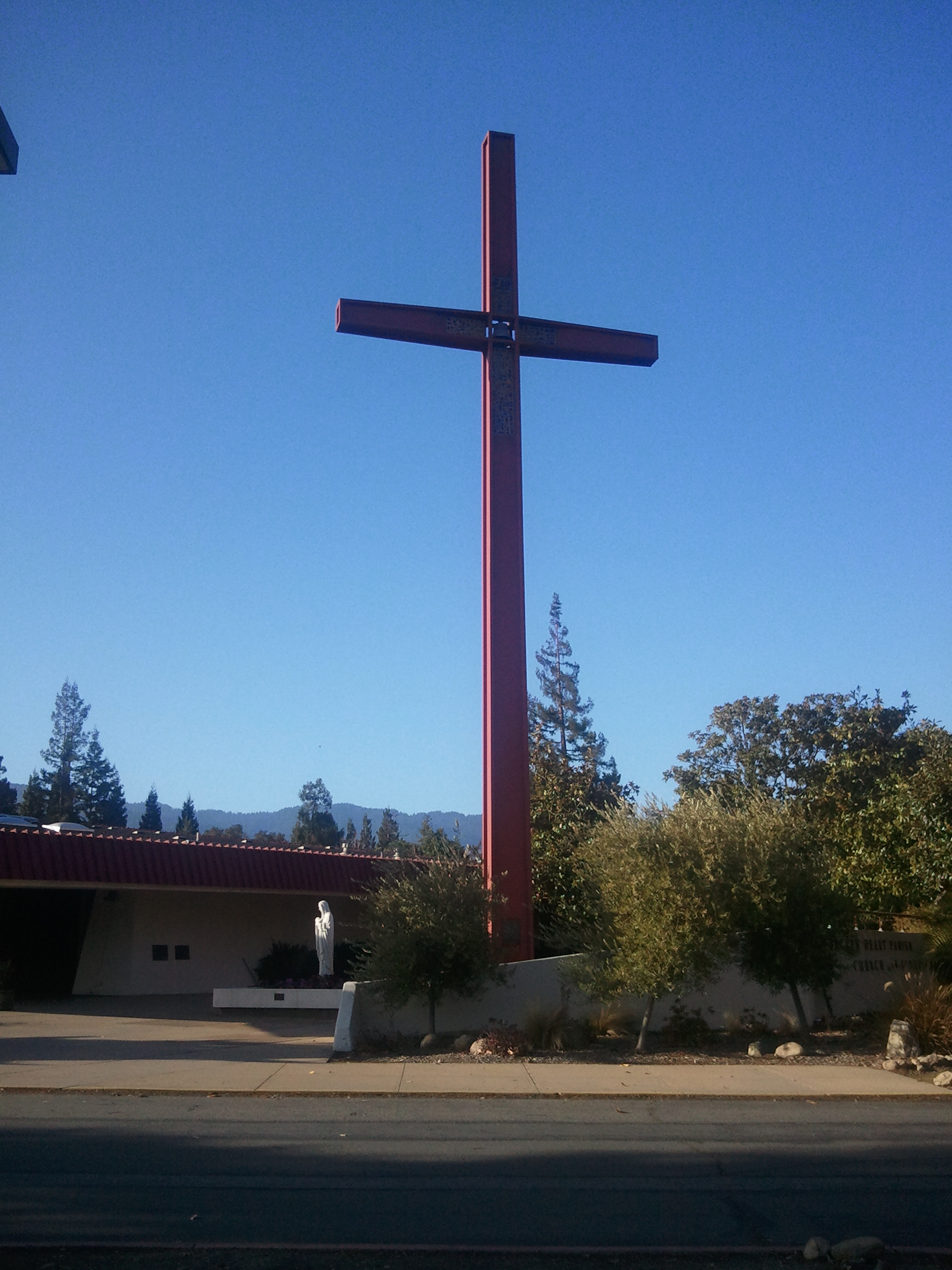
Cross at Sacred Heart Church, Saratoga, CA

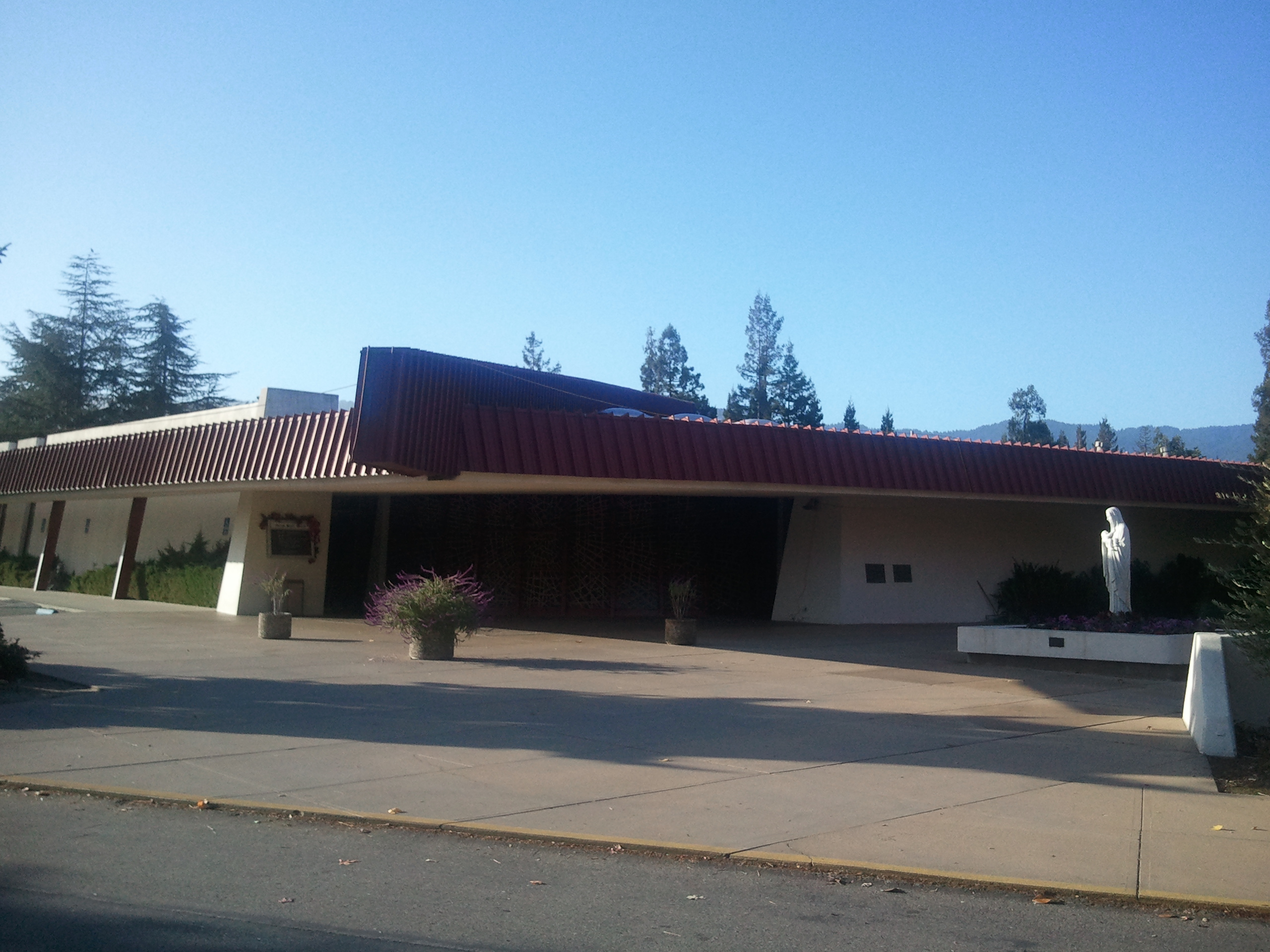
Sacred Heart Church, Saratoga CA

== History ==
Sacred Heart Church was established January 12, 1951 under the auspices the Archbishop of San Francisco, John Mitty. It is part of the Roman Catholic Diocese of San Jose in California and is located on Saratoga Avenue in Saratoga, California.

The beginnings of Sacred Heart Parish can be traced back to 1878 when Father Aloysius Masinate, S.J. came on horseback from Santa Clara College to offer Mass in the parlor of Hanna McCarthy, the widow of Martin McCarthy who had registered the first plot plan of the town in 1852, calling it McCarthysville. As the Catholic population grew in the 1880s, the mountain families built a chapel called St. John the Evangelist. But the mountain roads made it inconvenient for Saratoga Catholics to attend Mass up there, so a church was built in 1895 at Sixth and Big Basin Way. The President of Santa Clara College, Fr. Joseph Riordan, S.J. preached the dedication sermon in which the name of Sacred Heart of Jesus was attached to Saratoga's second Catholic Church. This functioned as a mission for the next 65 years. In 1905, when Saratoga was linked to San Jose by Electric Car C Line, Sacred Heart was attached as a mission to St. Joseph's Church in San Jose. The same year, the Sisters of Notre Dame de Namur established a villa in Saratoga and started providing religious instruction for children. Finally, in 1913 when Saint Joseph of Cupertino Parish was established as a parish, Sacred Heart was attached to it as a mission. It continued as a mission until it was raised to the status of Parish with its own resident Pastor on January 12, 1951, with Fr. Gerald Geary as Pastor.

By 1955, the congregation had grown to the point that the Sixth and Big Basin property was not large enough. The church hall seating 700 with a side chapel (now the parish school extended care) was constructed in 1960, and on March 2 that year, the first Masses were offered there. In 1961, additional land was purchased for further expansion of the parish facilities. By 1963, the parish school was filled to capacity and it was decided to expand it. In April 1967, the convent was completed so that the Notre Dame Sisters who staffed Sacred Heart School could become part of the Parish Community. Preparation for the new church began in 1967, construction began in 1969 and was completed in March 1970. The original parish church bell was mounted in an 80 foot high Cross and Bell Tower adjacent to the church. April 11, 1970 was the day the church moved from the old Church hall to the new church. It was dedicated on October 4, 1970, by Archbishop Joseph T. McGucken.
