= Our Lady of Perpetual Help Church, Petrozavodsk =

Coordinates: 61.7911°N 34.3686°E

Our Lady of Perpetual Help Church
- Храм Божией Матери Неустанной Помощи
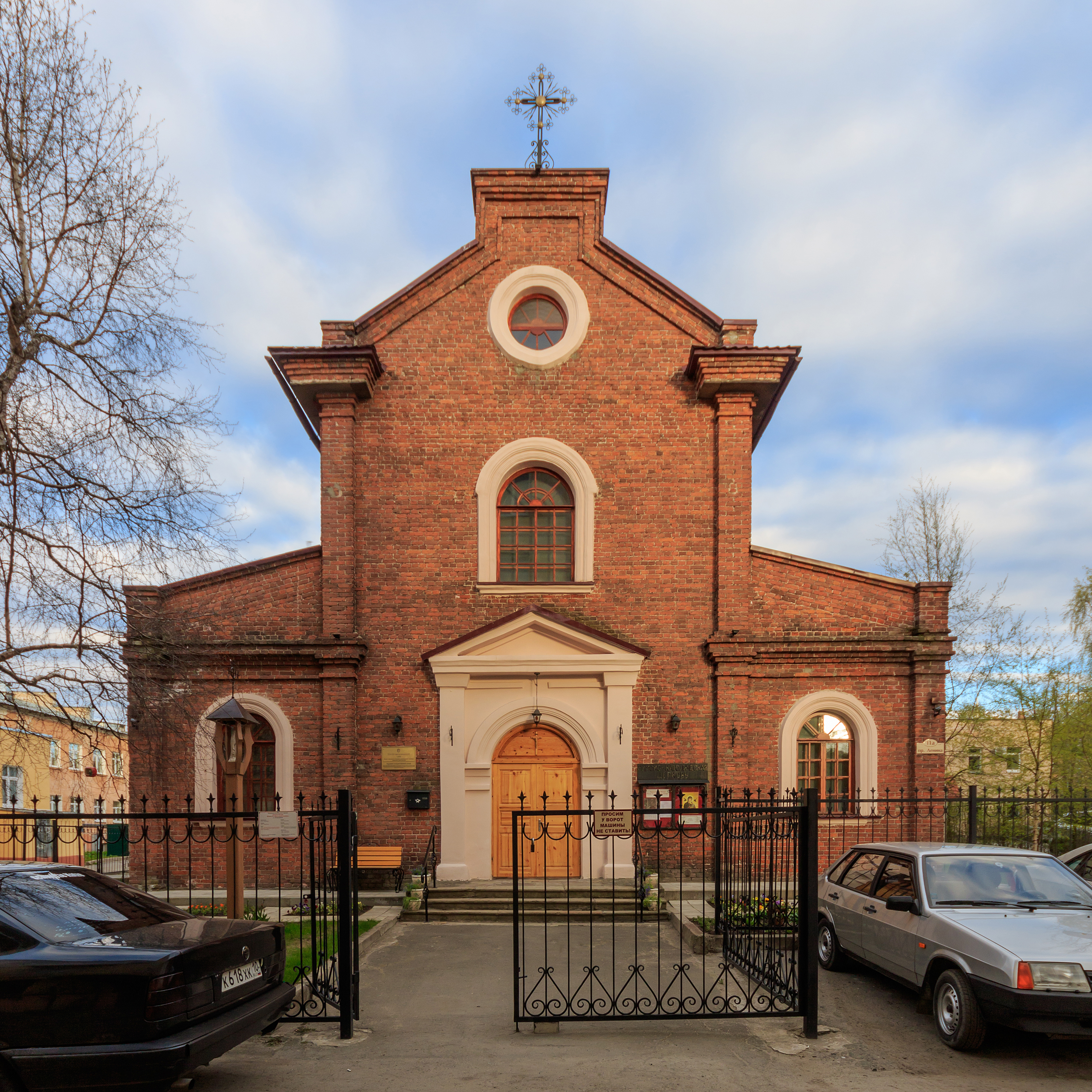
- Our Lady of Perpetual Help Church
- Location: Petrozavodsk
- Country: Russia
- Denomination: Roman Catholic Church

Architecture
- Years built: 1898-1904
- Completed: 1904

The Our Lady of Perpetual Help Church (Russian: Храм Божией Матери Неустанной Помощи) It is a Catholic church in the city of Petrozavodsk, belonging to the Archdiocese of Mother of God at Moscow, Russia. It is at 11 Lenin Avenue, the main street in that city.

== History ==
Catholics in Petrozavodsk long fought for the right to build a church in the city. Several petitions were filed in 1862, and declined until 1897, when the number of Catholics in Petrozavodsk arrived in this period of about 150 people.

The construction of a small stone church began in 1898 and was suspended due to financial problems. The final building in the shape of a medieval basilica, was completed in 1904 and was consecrated the same year as the chapel. The pipe organ was built in 1906. In 1910, the building was dedicated to Virgin Mary.

The church was closed in 1927 and its assets seized by the Bolsheviks. Between 1930 and 1961, it was occupied by several agencies, an aviators' club, a house of culture, and finally by the Union of Soviet Composers.

After the collapse of the Soviet Union the church was authorized again, for a time the church shared the space together with the Union of Composers and was only given to the Catholic community from 2003.

On September 4, 2005, a century after its first consecration, the church was reconsecrated by Archbishop Tadeusz Kondrusiewicz. Masses are held in Russian and Polish.

== See also ==
- Roman Catholicism in Russia
- Our Lady of Perpetual Help Church

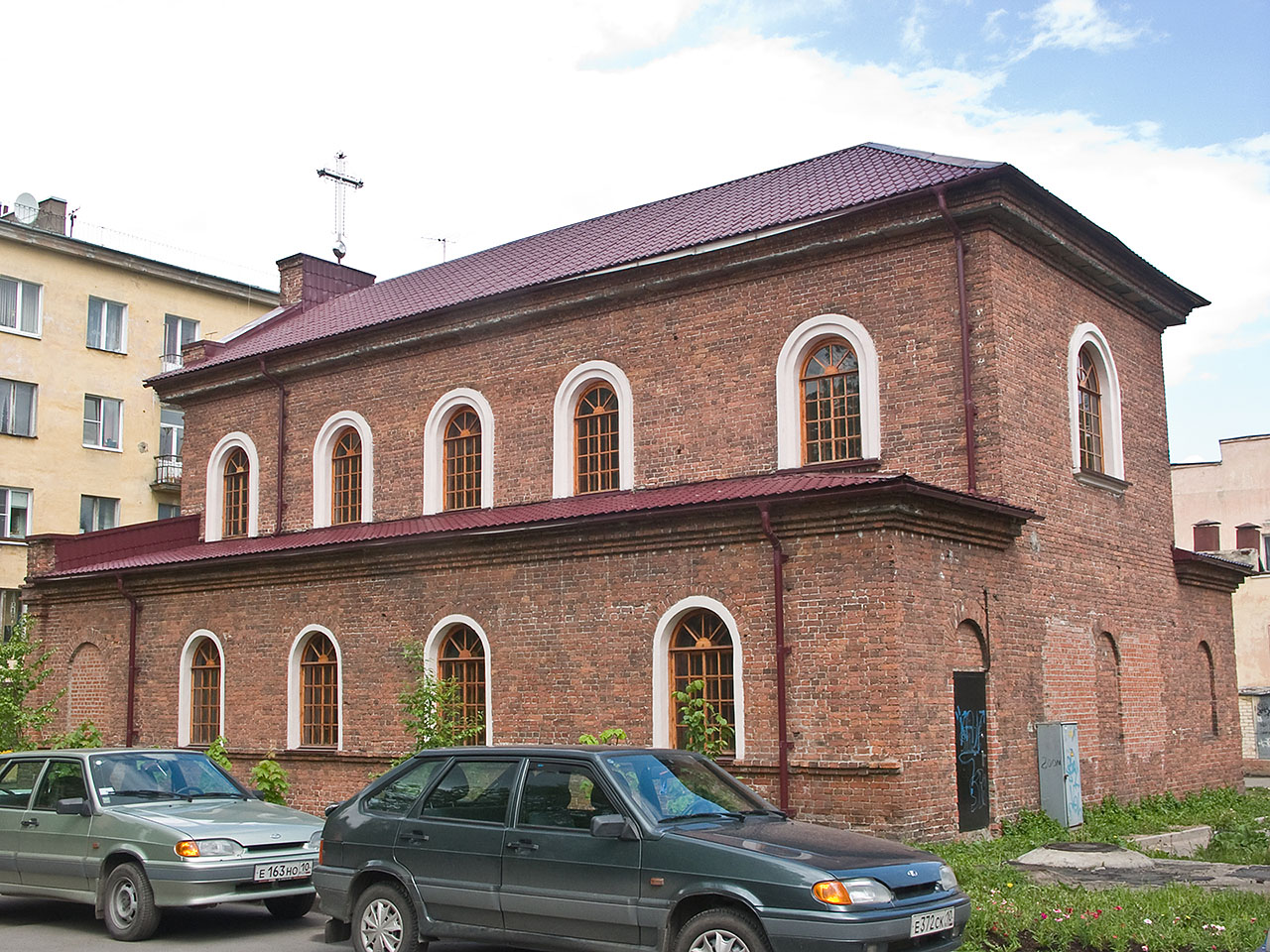
Another View
