= St. Mary's Syro-Malabar Forane Church, Chalakudy =

St. Mary's Forane Church
- St. Mary's Forane Church, Chalakudy
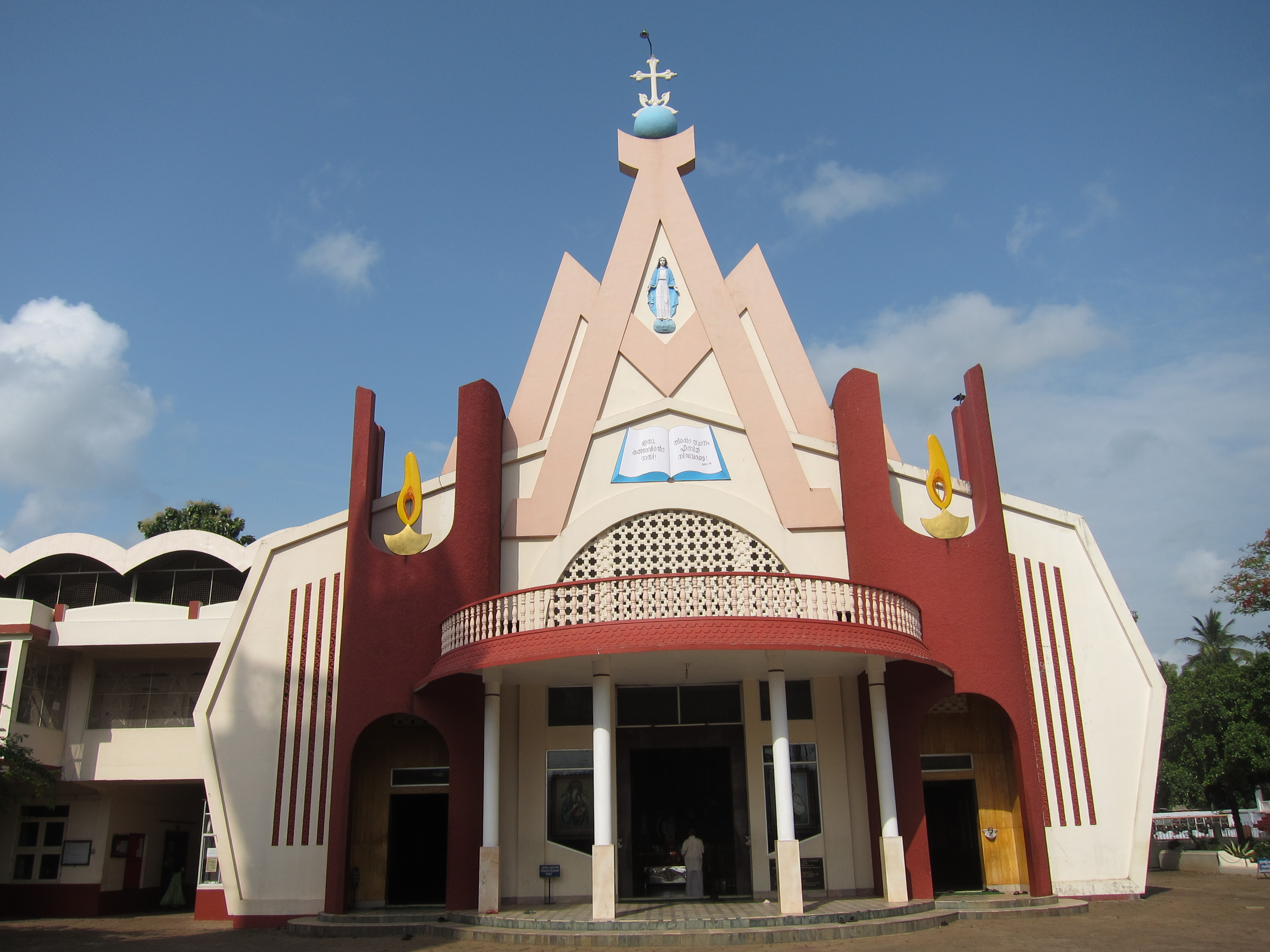
- St. Mary's Forane Church
- 10°18′9″N 76°20′22″E
- Location: Chalakudy, Thrissur district, Kerala
- Country: India
- Denomination: Syro-Malabar Catholic Church
- Churchmanship: High church
- Website: Official website

History
- Status: Church
- Dedication: Mother Mary
- Consecrated: 600 AD

Architecture
- Functional status: Active
- Architectural type: Modern

Administration
- Diocese: Syro-Malabar Catholic Eparchy of Irinjalakuda

Clergy
- Vicar: Fr. Jolly Vadakkan

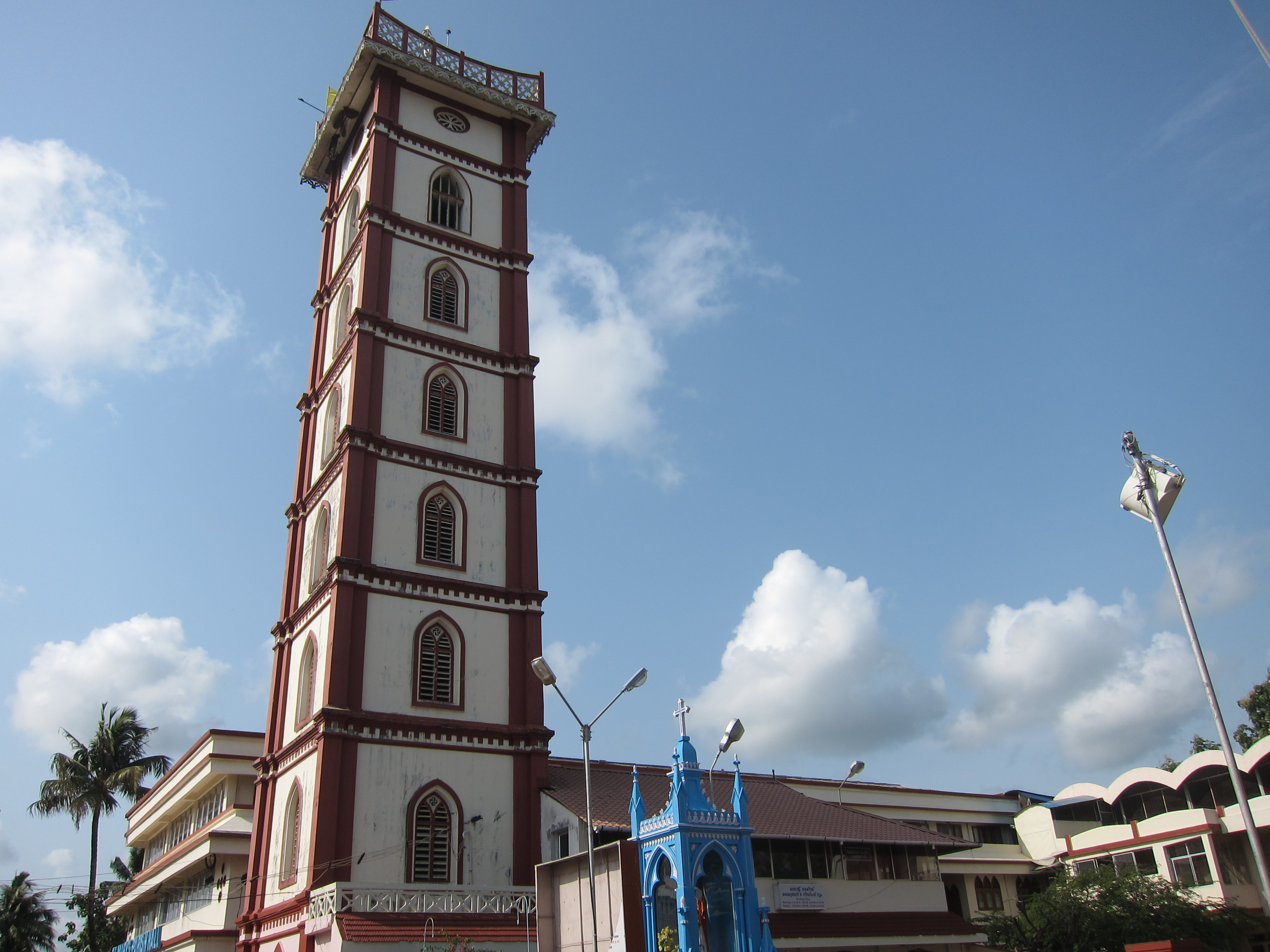
The tower

St. Mary's Forane Church, Chalakudy, is one of the 10 Foranes or deaneries under the Syro-Malabar Catholic Eparchy of Irinjalakuda, which was established in 1978 by the bifurcation of Thrissur Diocese. Prior to that, Chalakudy was part of Thrissur diocese, the most ancient Diocese of the Syro-Malabar Catholic Church. Thrissur diocese has since been elevated to an archdiocese, Syro-Malabar Catholic Archeparchy of Thrissur, within which comes the Irinjalakuda diocese. There are 16 parishes under the Chalakudy Forane. Chalakudy is one of those areas in Kerala with a high concentration of Christian population, most belonging to the Syro-Malabar Catholic Church.

== History ==
The origin of Christian faith in Chalakudy is claimed to date from the time when St. Thomas the Apostle, one of the twelve apostles of Jesus Christ, set foot in India with his mission shortly after Jesus's death. According to tradition, Apostle Thomas landed in Kodungallur, formerly known as Musiris, in 52 AD. At that time Kodungallur was a busy commercial center and an important port. St. Thomas travelled about various parts of Kerala preaching the Gospel and forming Christian communities, which began to grow in several places. The early Christian community in Chalakudy, who had been converted by Thomas, established the parish and built their first church in 600 AD. The church was built in an area predominantly occupied by Brahmins, who the granted permission to build the church there. The town has people of several religions. The church was then in the Palace Road, where it remained until about 1300 AD, when it moved to its present site a few hundred meters away.

The intercession of Blessed Virgin Mary is claimed to have taken place long ago. The original altar is known as "Swayamvara Altar", a title sparingly bestowed by the Pope. It is said that those who pray at this altar with complete self-surrender will receive special blessings. In 1937, the parish was elevated to the status of a Forane. The church was rebuilt in 1987 but the original intricately carved wooden altar was left intact.

In 1966, 432 families were delinked from the parish to form a new parish under the forane with its base at Our Lady of Perpetual Help Church, West Chalakudy.

== Holy Land replica ==
The Holy Land replica was accomplished in 2006. Civil structures are built in ancient architectural styles to give as much resemblance to the originals as possible.

It depicts events from the life of Jesus, especially his birth, public ministry, passion, crucifixion, and believed resurrection & ascension, and concludes with the scene of his mother Mary being crowned as the Queen of heaven and earth.

== See also ==
- Pindi Perunnal
