= Holy Land Chalakudy =

- Holy Land, Chalakudy
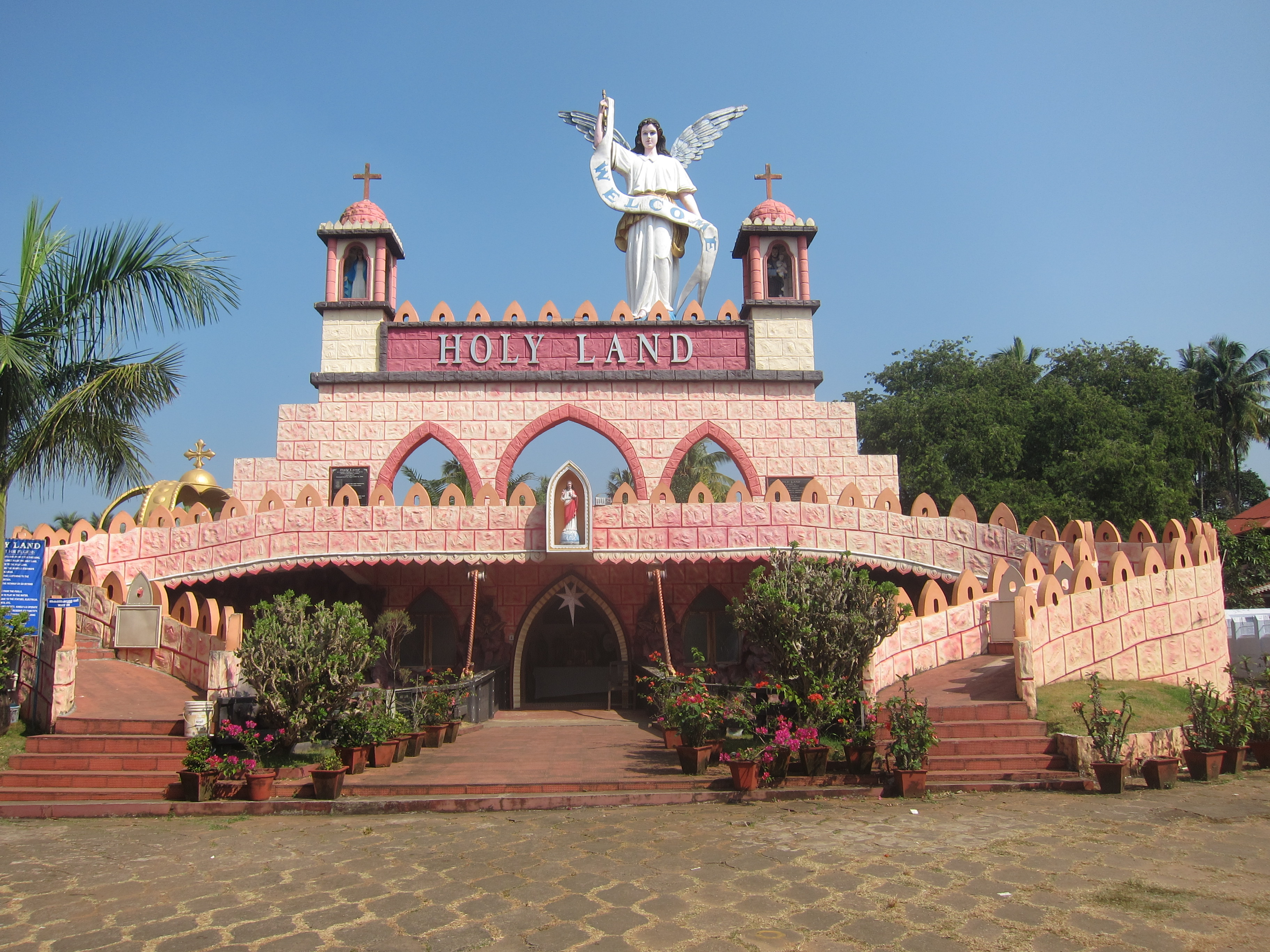
- Holy Land Chalakudy
- 10°18′9″N 76°20′22″E
- Location: Chalakudy, Thrissur district, Kerala
- Country: India
- Website: Official website

History
- Status: Travel Point
- Consecrated: 2006 AD

Architecture
- Functional status: Active
- Architectural type: Modern

Administration
- Diocese: Syro-Malabar Catholic Eparchy of Irinjalakuda

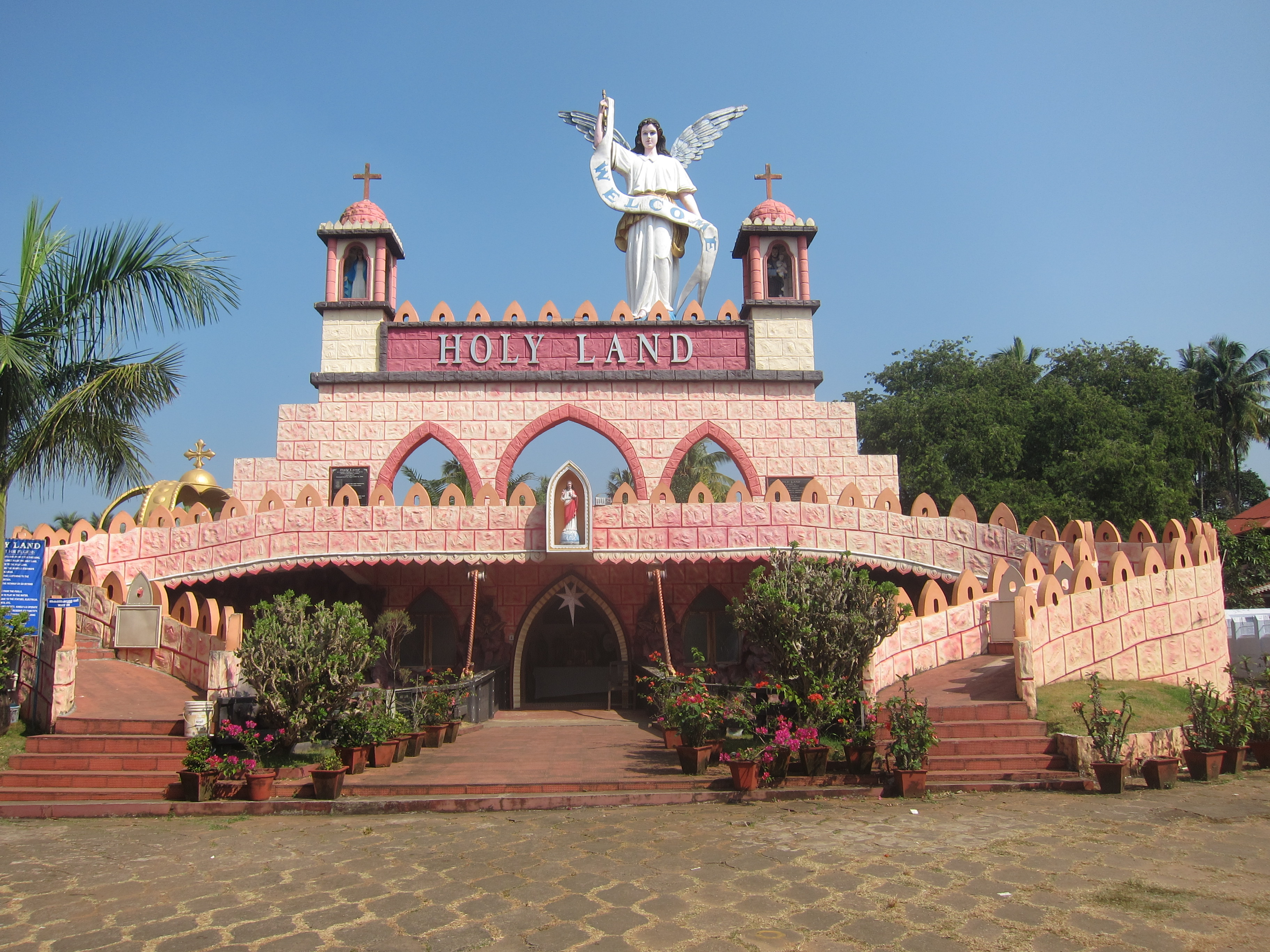
Holy Land Chalakudy

Holy Land Chalakudy, is the replica of the original Holy Land according to The Bible, situated at Chalakudy in Thrissur, Kerala, India. The major attractions include statutes resembling the various incidents of The Bible. Birth of Jesus Christ, Marriage at Cana, Jesus teachings, Gagultha, Resurrection of Christ etc. The Pietà is one of the major attractions. It is at St. Mary's Forane Church Chalakudy. It is one of the major travel attraction among tourists. It is also one of the Marian pilgrimage centres.
