= Saint Joseph Parish (Mountain View, California) =

St. Joseph Parish
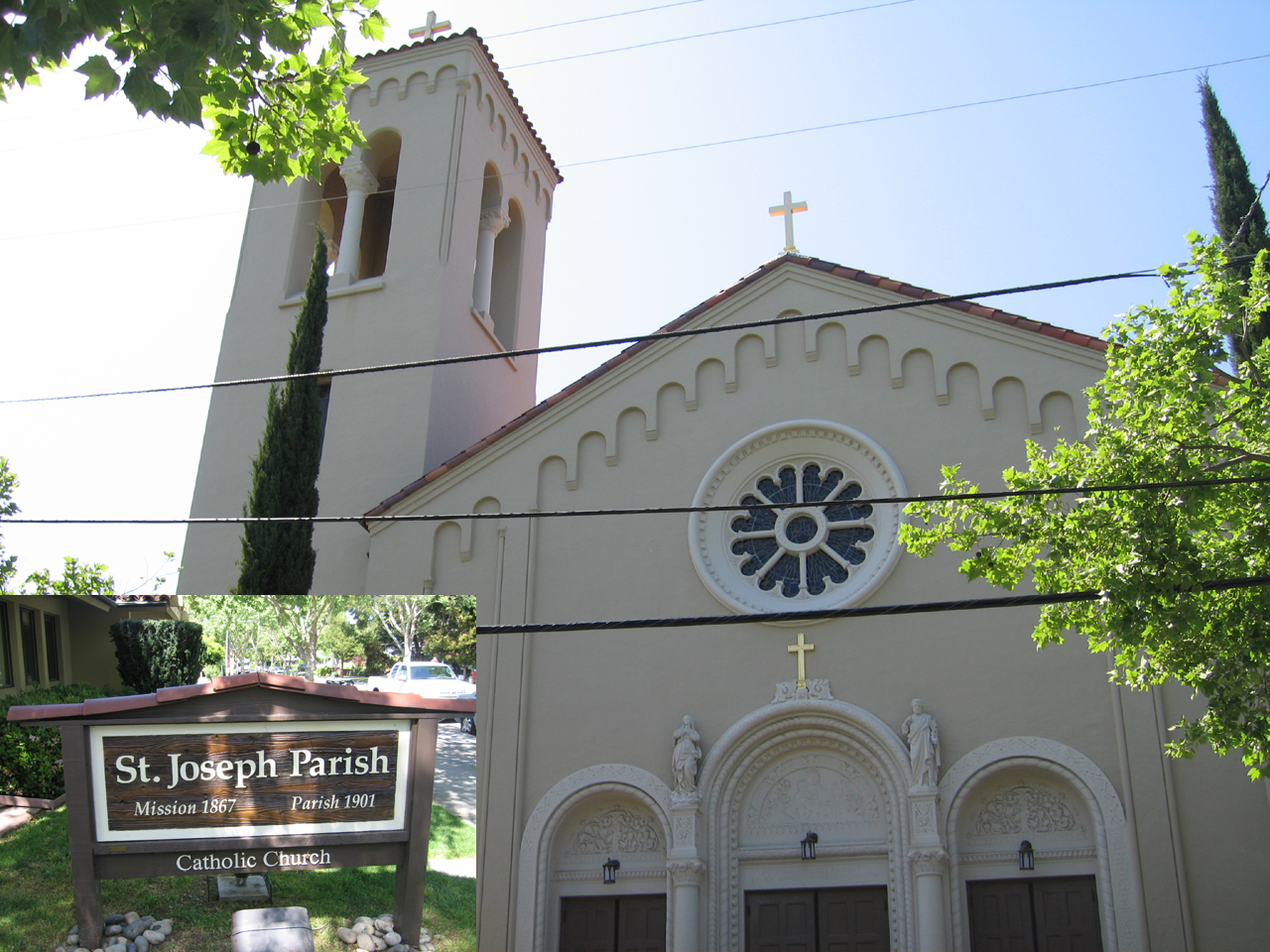
- Exterior view of St. Joseph Parish Church in Mountain View

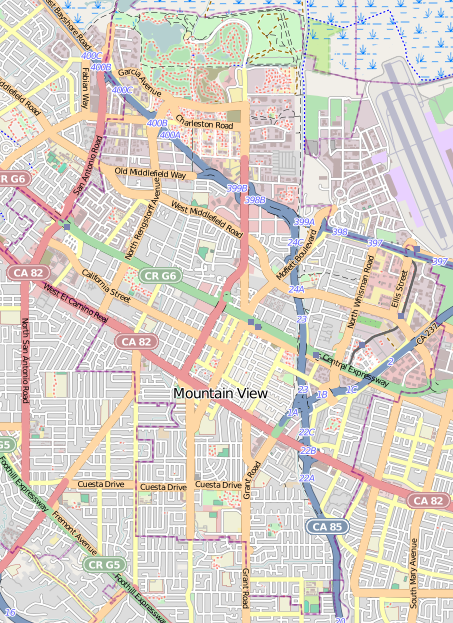
- Location within Mountain View, California Location within San Francisco Bay Area
- 37°23′17″N 122°04′54″W
- Location: 582 Hope Street; Mountain View, California
- Country: United States
- Denomination: Roman Catholic
- Website: www.sjpmv.org

History
- Status: Parish church
- Founded: 1905
- Founder: Rev. Fr. John J. Cullen
- Dedication: Saint Joseph
- Events: Feast Day of St. Joseph, Confessor (March 19) · Feast Day of St. Joseph the Worker, Confessor (May 1)

Architecture
- Functional status: Active
- Architectural type: Church
- Style: Gothic
- Groundbreaking: 1905

Specifications
- Capacity: 540

Administration
- Province: Ecclesiastical province of San Francisco
- Archdiocese: Archidioecesis Sancti Francisci
- Diocese: Dioecesis Sancti Josephi in California
- Deanery: Deanery 2

Clergy
- Bishop: The Most Rev. Oscar Cantú
- Vicar(s): Rev. Fr. Noel Sanvicente, JCD; Rev. Fr. Thierry Geris (retired)
- Pastor(s): Rev. Fr. Engelberto Guzman Gammad, JCD
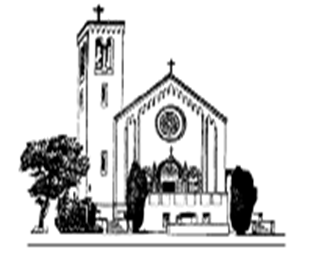

Saint Joseph Parish in Mountain View, California, is a parish in the Roman Catholic Church. The parish and its church are located in Mountain View in the state of California, under the jurisdiction of the Roman Catholic Diocese of San Jose in California and its bishop. It is named after Saint Joseph, husband of Mary, the mother of Jesus; for whom the diocese and the nearby city of San Jose are also named.

The parish church is located on Hope Street, having been in continuous service since its initial building in 1905.

The parish school, St. Joseph Catholic School, is located on Miramonte Avenue, and is an elementary school for children from kindergarten through eighth grade.

== History ==
The first Catholic church in the City of Mountain View was built in 1867 with funds gathered by Rev. Joseph Bixio, S.J., of Santa Clara. The original structure was a little white wooden building, topped by a cross, nestled among tall shade trees and enclosed by a white picket fence at the corner of El Camino Real and Alviso Road. The land was donated by John Sullivan whose teams hauled the lumber from Watsonville. It was a small church accommodating 150 people until 1884 when its capacity was increased to 250. Rev. John J. Cullen was appointed the first pastor in 1901.

The present church property, located on Castro, Church and Hope streets, was donated by the Castro family. In 1905 concrete was poured for the foundations and a wooden church was established. St. Joseph's Parish then included the towns of Mountain View, Los Altos, Sunnyvale, and Mayfield (south of Palo Alto), ranging from San Francisco Bay to Skyline Ridge in the Santa Cruz Mountains at that time.

The population growth — spurred by the railroad — put great pressure on the parish and its church within a few years after its completion. Therefore in 1916 Saint Martin Parish was established in Sunnyvale, followed by St. Aloysius in Mayfield in 1919, Saint Nicholas in Los Altos in 1947, St. Athanasius in Mountain View in 1959, and St. Cyprian Parish in Sunnyvale in 1962.

In 1928, St. Joseph's Church burned down as a result of a fire set by a pyromaniac. In 1929 the present church was built with a seating capacity of 650. Starting in 1948, under the direction of Father James Doyle, the church acquired 15 acres (6.1 ha) off Miramonte Avenue near El Camino Real and established St. Joseph's Elementary School and Holy Cross High School for girls.

In 2015, the church entered into a deal with the Sobrato Organization to build a 4-story mixed use development on the church's parking lot. Construction began in 2017.

The parish's church history is further detailed at its Parish History page which includes a link to historical photos of St Joseph Church.

== Architecture and design ==
St. Joseph Parish Church is designed along the cruciform lines of the Gothic period. As such, the main floor of the church contains the narthex, nave, transept, sanctuary, and sacristy. The bottom floor contains Father Doyle Hall, a meeting hall, as well as the church's restrooms.

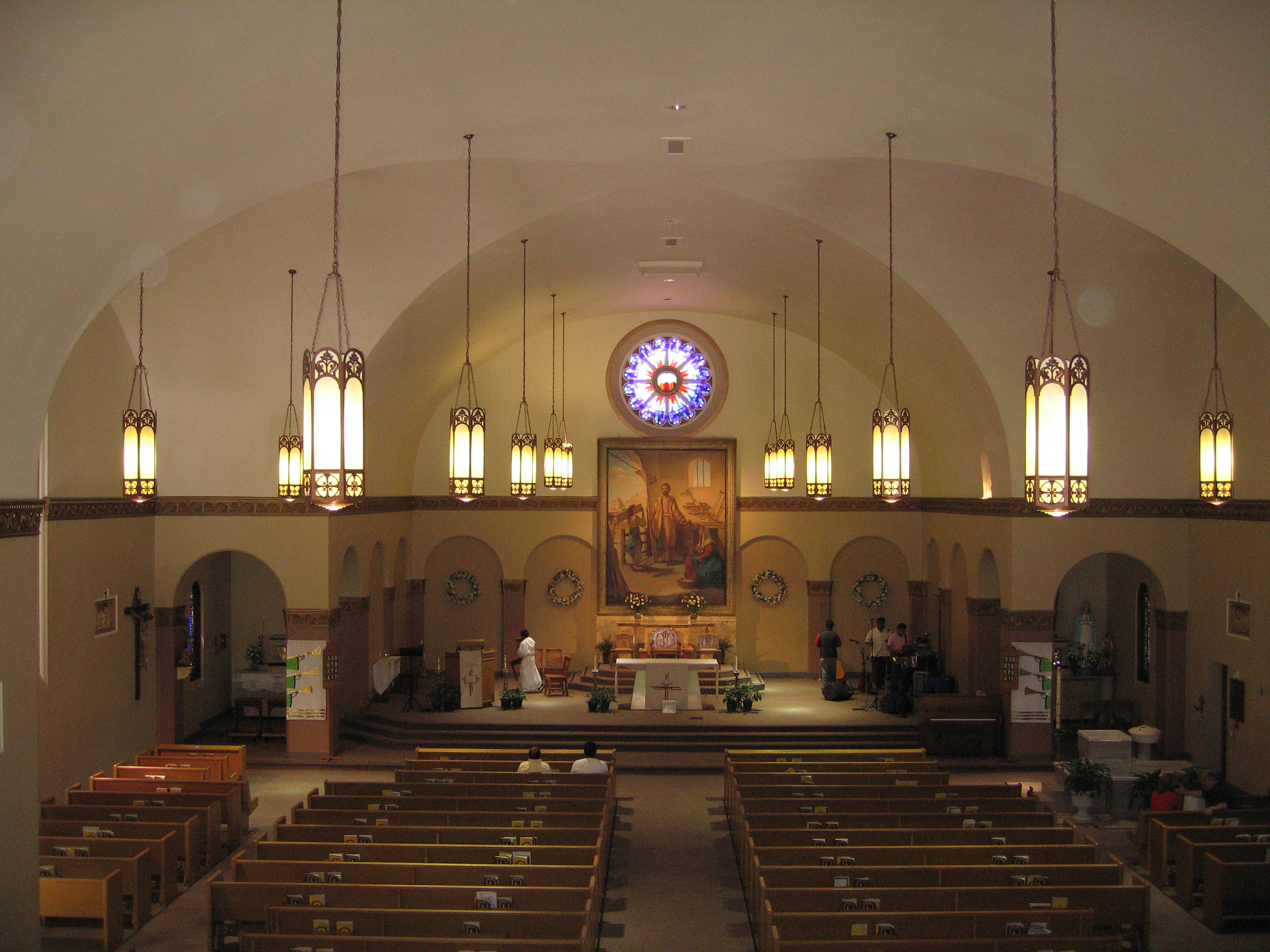
Altar of St. Joseph Parish

Because the parish church was founded prior to the Second Vatican Council, the church contains a high altar, behind which the large portrait of St. Joseph served as a reredos. These two features were common though by no means universal at that time (see ad orientem). The altar rails have since been removed, allowing easier access to the laity who now participate in the celebration of the Mass.

At either side of the church, on the altar side of the transept, are two grottoes. On the left is the tabernacle, containing the reserve of the consecrated hosts. On the right is the almery which contains the vessels of the Oil of the Catechumens, Oil of the Sick, and Sacred Chrism. These vessels are replenished annually, when a new supply is blessed at the chrism Mass by the bishop. The oils are then received at the Holy Thursday Mass of the Lord's Supper, in accordance with local ritual.

The main floor of the church is decorated with several stained glass windows, reflecting the Roman arched architecture. These may be found at the ends of the transept, along the nave, and above the high altar. There is an additional stained glass window at the rear of the church, not easily seen above the choir loft and organ pipes.

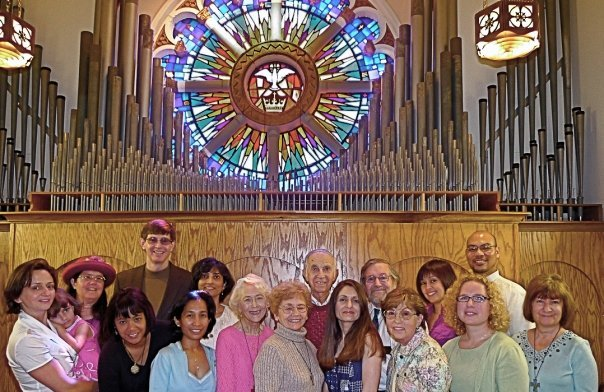
Choir Loft: great pipes, stained glass, and choir in 2009

Voices of Praise
- Choir
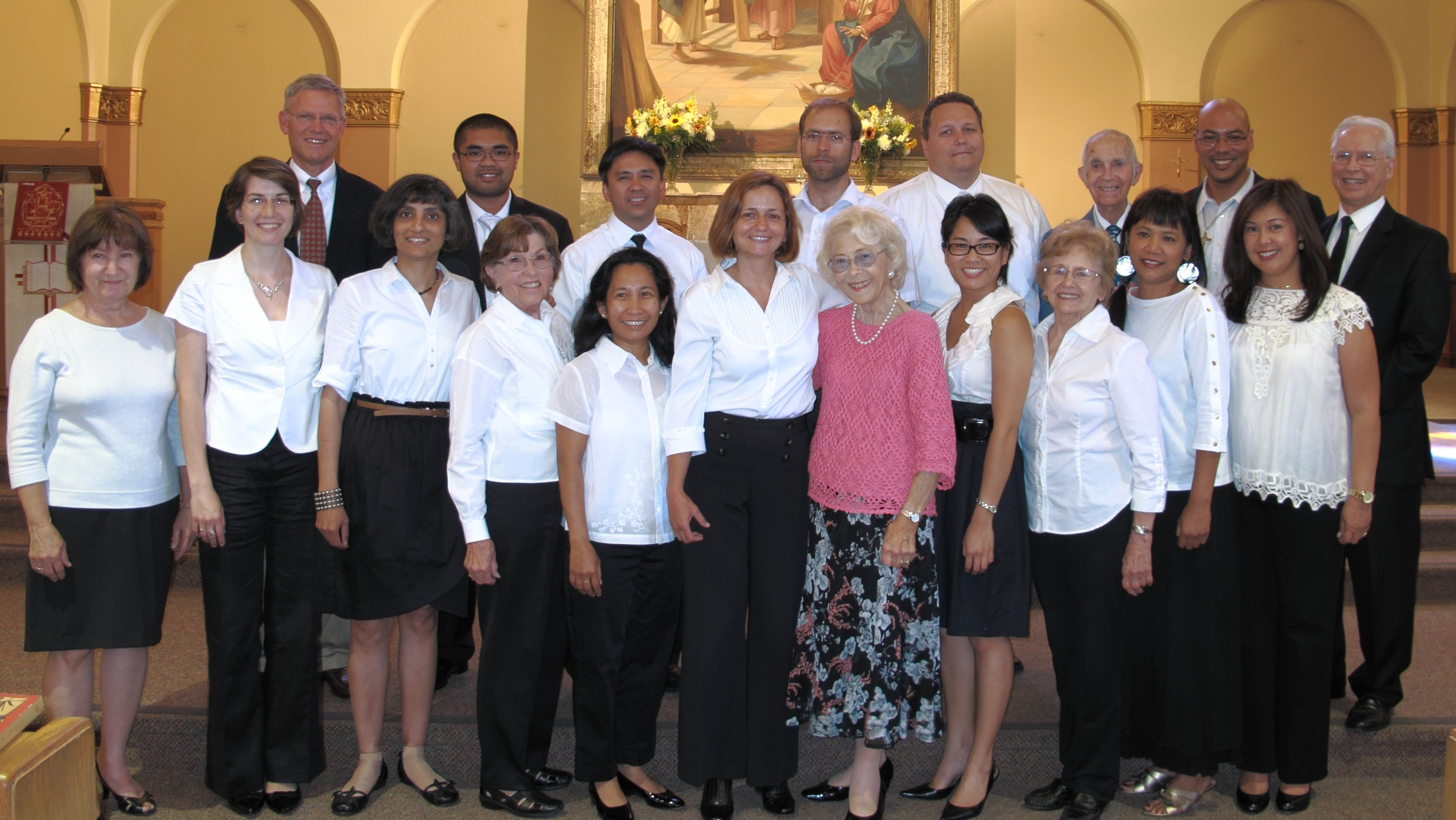
- Voices of Praise Choir, 06/03/2012
- Origin: Saint Joseph Parish (Mountain View, California)
- Founded: 2001
- Genre: Liturgical and Church Music
- Members: 19
- Music director: Robert M. Quijano
- Associated groups: Son de Dios
- Website: St. Joseph Parish Liturgical Ministries

== Murray M. Harris Organ ==
The church's pipe organ, originally built in 1906 for St. Ignatius Church in San Francisco by Murray M. Harris was saved from fire resulting from the 1906 earthquake, and was acquired by St. Joseph Parish and re-installed in the new church in 1928. The instrument went through many modifications from 1965 to 2005, and now has a new console (1981) and pipe ranks. The organ pipes occupy much of the choir loft, with the great pipes centrally located at the rear, framing the rose window. The swell and choir pipes are contained in chambers on either side of the rose window.

The organ is in frequent use at services both on weekends and weekdays, which differs from much church practice today.

== Meneely Bronze Bell ==
The 42" 1,320 lbs. bronze church bell, cast by the Meneely Bell Foundry of West Troy, New York in 1905 and outfitted by The Verdin Bell Company of Cincinnati, Ohio in 1964, is rung weekdays at noon Angelus, but otherwise is not normally rung due in part to the close proximity of neighbors' homes, and due also in part to the adverse effects the tolling of the bell may have upon the organ pipes, which share the common rear wall of the building.

St. Joseph Church Bell
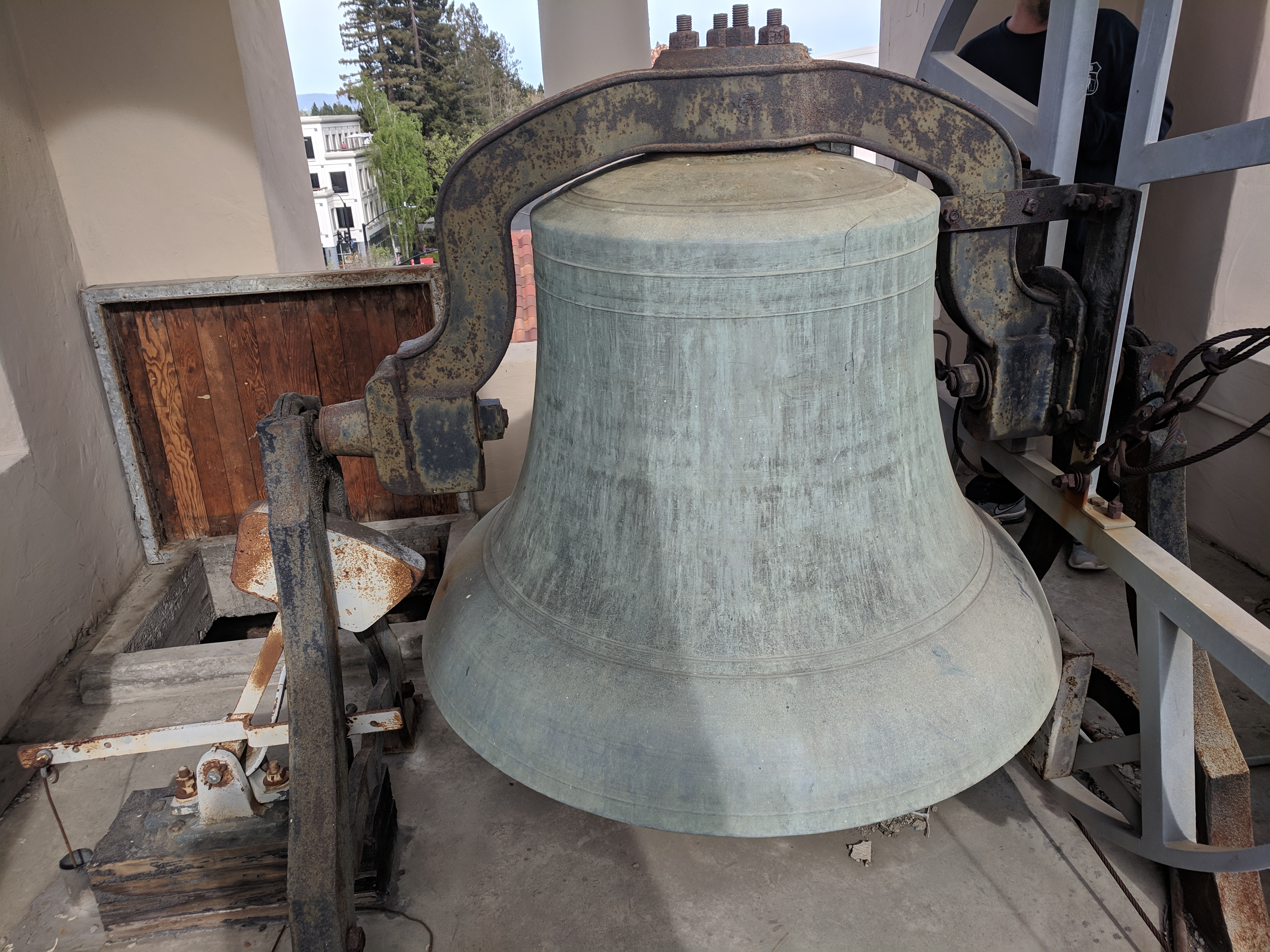
- The 42" 1,320 lbs. tower bell
- Material: Bronze
- Created: 1905 by the Meneely Bell Foundry
- Present location: Saint Joseph Roman Catholic Church; Mountain View, California

== Succession of pastors ==
	Name	Photo	Start	End	Years served	Background	Ordination
1	Rev. Msgr. John J. Cullen ✝		1901	1910	10	First pastor	
2	Rev. Fr. Michael Horan ✝		1910	1917	8		
3	Rev. Fr. John Smyth ✝		1917	1922	6		
4	Rev. Fr. Lawrence Murphy ✝		1922	1923	2		
5	Rev. Fr. James W. Galvin ✝		1923	1944	22		
6	Rev. Fr. John M. Kennedy ✝		1938	1947	10	Fr. Kennedy served as administrator from 1938-1944 and pastor from 1944-1947	
7	Rev. Fr. James B. Doyle ✝		1947	1963	17	The parish hall in the church basement named for him	
8	Rev. Fr. George D. Moss ✝		1963	1976	14	During his pastorship the historic tower bell, cast in 1905, was installed by the Verdin Company of Cincinnati, Ohio	
9	Rev. Msgr. William M. Lenane ✝		1976	1984	9		
10	Rev. Msgr. Eugene P. O'Donnell		1984	1996	13	Served as pastor of St. Francis of Assisi Parish in San Jose, California. Retired in 2018, he returns to St. Joseph to celebrate Mass in Gaelic every year. He was invested as a Chaplain of His Holiness on April 2, 2011.	June 17, 1973 for the Archdiocese of San Francisco
11	Rev. Fr. Oscar Degillo Tabujara		1996	2009	14	Served as pastor of Saint Athanasius Parish, also located in Mountain View, from 2009 to 2019. Retired in 2019.	December 22, 1975
12	Rev. Fr. Timothy J. Kidney ✝		2009	2010	2	Retired in 2012	Ordained May 29, 1971 at Saint Mary's Cathedral by Archbishop Joseph T. McGucken.
13	Rev. Fr. Roberto Adrian Rojas		2010	2011	2	On leave of absence	October 12, 1996
14	Rev. Fr. Luis Eduardo Vargas		2011	2015	5	Currently serving as pastor of Sacred Heart of Jesus Parish	June 13, 1998
15	Rev. Fr. Engelberto Guzman Gammad, JCD		2015	Incumbent	10	Current pastor	Ordained May 24, 1984 for the Roman Catholic Archdiocese of Tuguegarao

== Parish school ==
St. Joseph school was founded in 1952 by Rev. Fr. James B. Doyle. Originally the school was housed in temporary quarters on what is now part of St. Francis High School. The current school location was constructed in 1954. As with St. Francis High School, the school was originally staffed by the Sisters of the Holy Cross. The sisters ceased to staff the school in 1982, thereby opening up staff positions to the laity. The former principal, Mrs. Stephanie Mirenda Knight, was a student of the school.

Although it is a Catholic School, a non-discriminatory policy is in effect, whereby students of any race, color, religion, national or ethnic origin may be admitted. Students who are not Roman Catholic are exempted from parts of the curriculum which are specific to religious education or ministration of sacraments. Grade placement is determined by a test battery to verify basic skills.

The school maintains one classroom per grade, with a school network connecting at least two computers in each classroom. In addition, the school maintains a science room, library, auditorium, and computer lab.

The school serves approximately 200 families, and has an enrollment of over 200 students.
