= Our Lady of Perpetual Help Cathedral, El Vigia =

Our Lady of Perpetual Help Cathedral
- Catedral de Nuestra Señora del Perpetuo Socorro
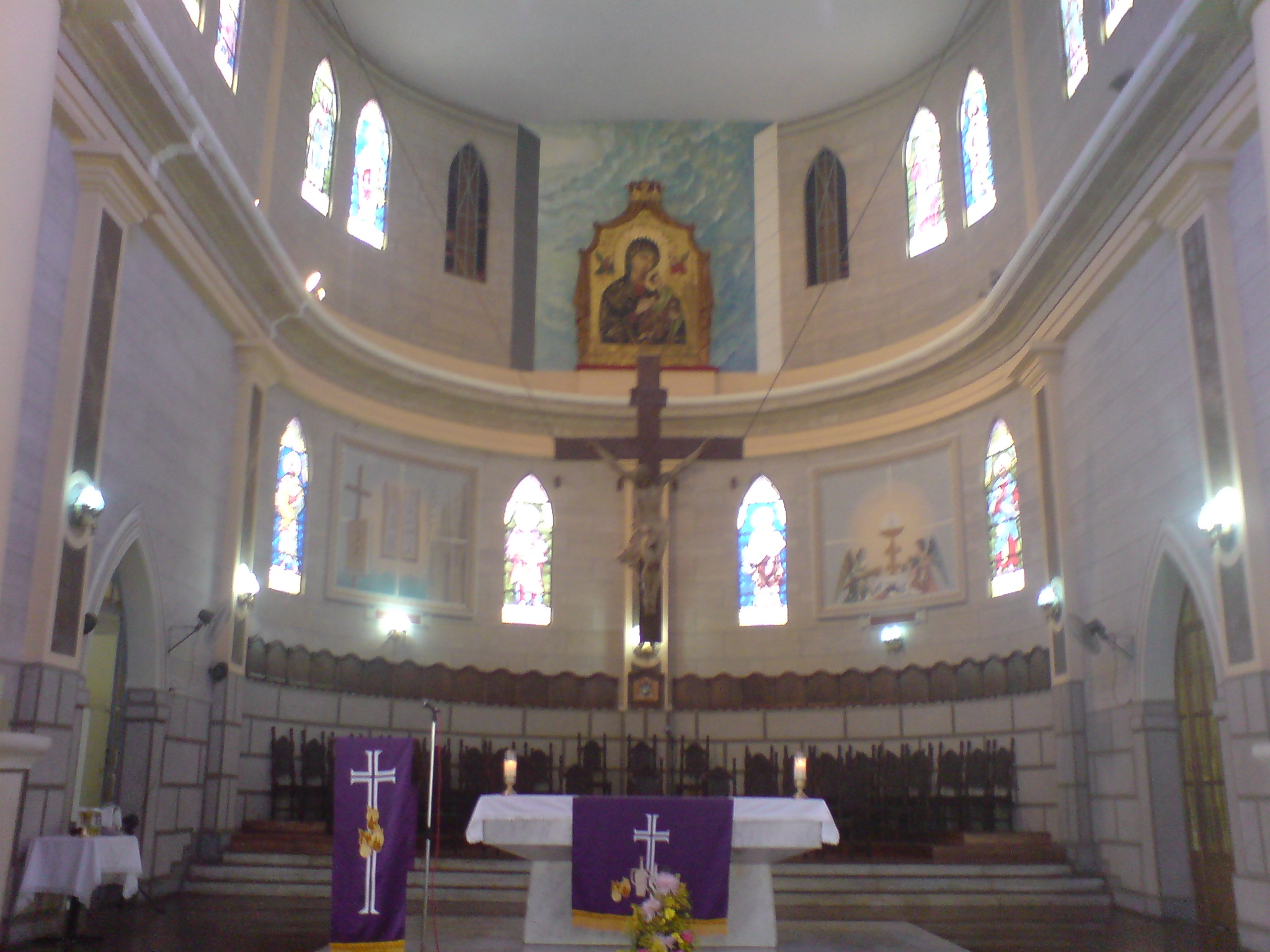
- Our Lady of Perpetual Help Cathedral
- Location: El Vigia
- Country: Venezuela
- Denomination: Roman Catholic Church

The Our Lady of Perpetual Help Cathedral (Spanish: Catedral de Nuestra Señora del Perpetuo Socorro) Also El Vigia Cathedral is a Catholic church located in El Vigia, Mérida state, Venezuela. Is located on Bolivar Avenue to 15th Avenue, opposite the Bolívar Square of El Vigia.

== History ==
On 14 April 1957 the archbishop of Mérida, Acacio Chacín, laid the first stone. On May 21 of that same year construction he began. The layout was made by José Ignacio Olivares, priest of El Vigia. On 12 March 1959 the parish of Our Lady of Perpetual Help was founded. In 1994 the Roman Catholic Diocese of El Vigia-San Carlos del Zulia was erected.

The cathedral building is concrete, decorated on the outside with granite. The bell tower brick has tablets. The cathedral has a large entrance and two small entrances on the facade. There are also two side entrances. The ships are separated by 36 columns. It has 30 windows and 48 small windows.

== See also ==
- Roman Catholicism in Venezuela
- Our Lady of Perpetual Help Cathedral
