= Saint Brother Albert Chmielowski Polish Mission =

- Polska Misja Katolicka Św. Brata Alberta Chmielowskiego w San Jose
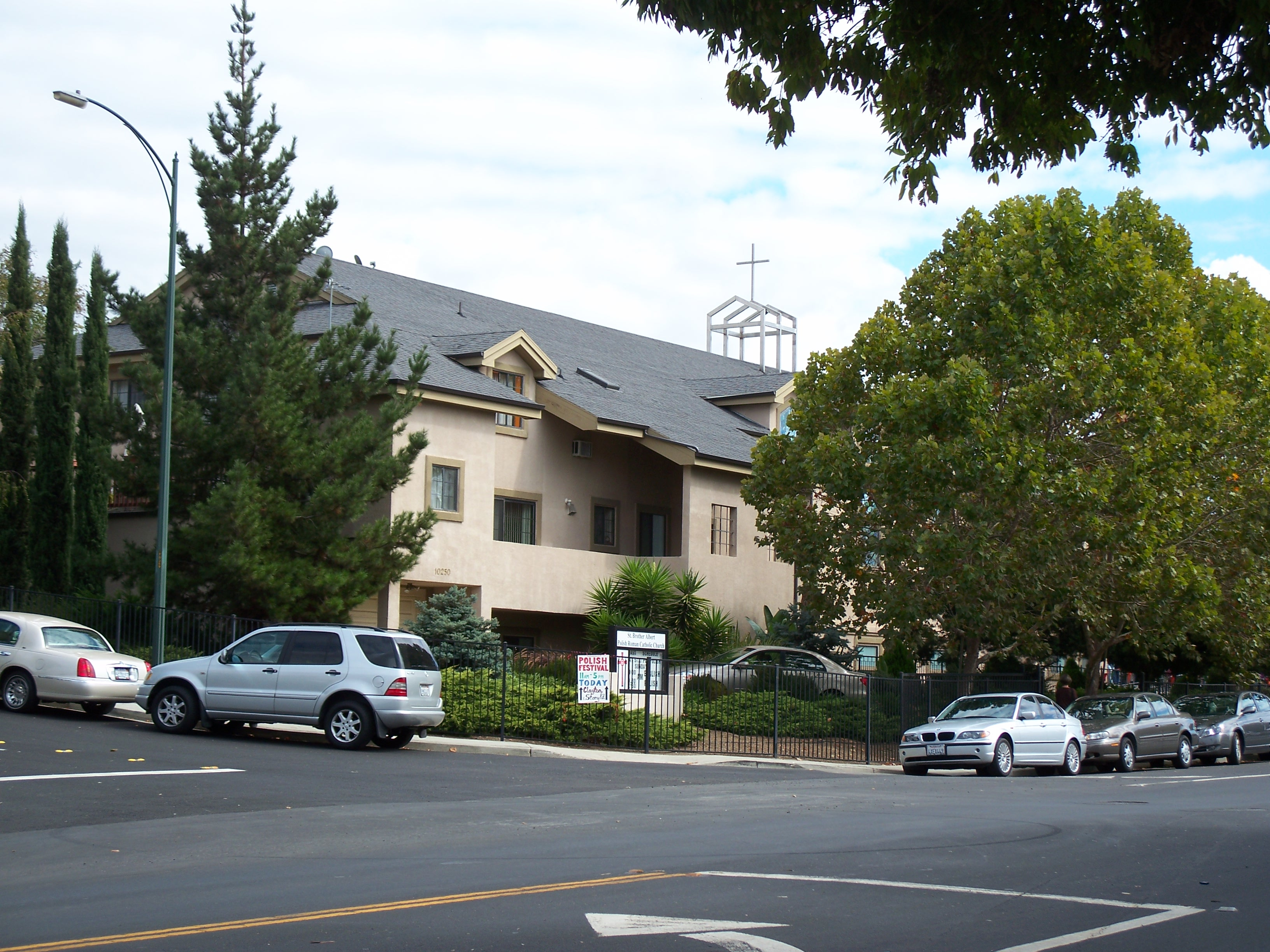

- Location within San Jose, California
- 37°21′26″N 121°48′28″W
- Location: 10250 Clayton Road; San Jose, California
- Country: USA
- Denomination: Roman Catholic
- Website: www.saintalbert.us

History
- Status: Parish church
- Founded: 1998
- Dedication: St. Albert Chmielowski

Architecture
- Functional status: Active
- Groundbreaking: 1997
- Completed: April 1998

Administration
- Province: Ecclesiastical province of San Francisco
- Archdiocese: Archidioecesis Sancti Francisci
- Diocese: Dioecesis Sancti Josephi in California
- Deanery: Deanery 6

Clergy
- Bishop: The Most Rev. Patrick Joseph McGrath
- Vicar: Rev. Fr. Edward Mroczynski †
- Dean: Rev. Msgr. Francisco D. Rios (St. John Vianney Parish)
- Pastor(s): Rev. Fr. Stanislaw Michalek, SChr

Saint Brother Albert Chmielowski Polish Mission (Polish: Polska Misja Katolicka Św. Brata Alberta Chmielowskiego w San Jose) is the parish church of a Polish mission located in San Jose, California.

== History ==
Upon the creation of the Roman Catholic Diocese of San Jose in California and its split from the Roman Catholic Archdiocese of San Francisco, the Polish community of the area which was served by St. Wojciech Polish Mission in San Francisco found itself in need of a new home. Therefore, the Society of Christ built the Saint Brother Albert Chmielowski Polish Mission from the foundations up.

In 1976, Archbishop Joseph T. McGucken of San Francisco established the Polish Mission of St. Adalbert. Its purpose was to provide permanent ministry in the native language to those Poles living in the San Francisco Bay Area. The Mission's first priest was Fr. Wojciech Baryski, S.Chr., who was required to commute to San Jose. In 1981, his destination point in San Jose found itself within the new Diocese of San Jose, the result of a partitioning Archdiocese of San Francisco. During the eighties, the area was settled by a considerable number of Polish immigrants. The religious needs of this community required the creation of a separate pastoral mission, and the construction of a church. Land was purchased for this purpose. In 1986, the Polish Pastoral Mission was legally founded in San Jose, although it continued to be served by a commuting priest. In 1990, after the dividing of the Mission in San Francisco by the provincial authorities, the San Jose Mission received its own resident priest in the person of Fr. Andrzej Maslejak, S.Chr. That same year, the Mission was dedicated to St. Albert Chmielowski. Thanks to the sacrifice and patience of both the mission members and their priest, the new church was formally consecrated in 1998.

== Pastors ==
Fr. Stanisław Drzał, S.Chr. 1981 - 1989
Fr. Andrzej Maślejak, S.Chr. 1989 - 1991
Fr. Stanisław Żak, S.Chr. 1991 - 1996
Fr. Paweł Bandurski, S.Chr. 1996 - 2002
Fr. Jan Karpowicz, S.Chr. 2002 - 2006
Fr. Andrzej Salapata, S.Chr. 2006 - 2015
Fr. Jan Fiedurek, S.Chr. 2015 - 2024
Fr. Andrzej Totzke, S.Chr. 2024 - 2026
Fr. Stanisław Michałek, S.Chr. 2026 - Present

== See also ==
- Roman Catholic Diocese of San Jose in California
