= Saint Maria Goretti Parish (San Jose, California) =

St. Maria Goretti Church
- Location within San Jose, California
- 37°17′48″N 121°50′07″W
- Location: 2980 Senter Rd, San Jose, California
- Country: USA
- Denomination: Catholic
- Website: www.smgsj.org/

History
- Status: Parish church
- Founded: March 3, 1963
- Founder: Joseph Deans
- Dedication: Maria Goretti

Architecture
- Functional status: Active

Administration
- Province: San Francisco
- Diocese: San Jose in California
- Deanery: Deanery 6

Clergy
- Archbishop: Salvatore Cordileone
- Bishop: Oscar Cantú
- Pastor: Andrew C. Nguyen

Saint Maria Goretti Parish is a territorial parish of the Diocese of San José in California. When the parish was created, it was still part of the Archdiocese of San Francisco, before the founding of the Diocese of San Jose in 1981. The parish was established in July 1961 The parish was dedicated on March 3, 1963, and is named for Maria Goretti, an early 20th-century Catholic saint.
