= Our Lady of Perpetual Help Church, West Chalakudy =

Our Lady of Perpetual Help (OMPH) Church
- Church of the Our Lady of Perpetual Help, West Chalakudy
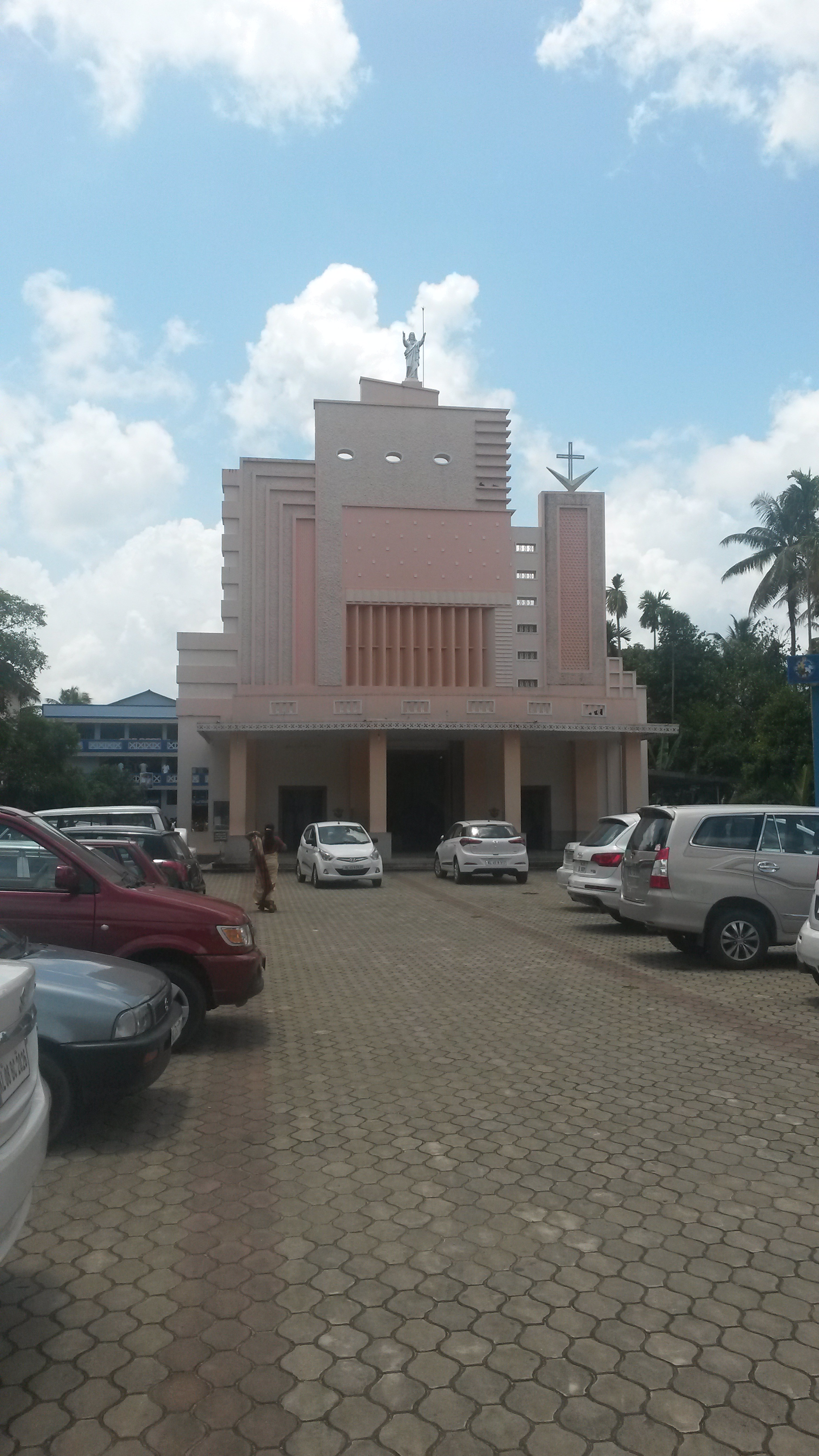
- Our Lady of Perpetual Help (OMPH) Church
- 10°17′48.3″N 76°19′07.5″E
- Location: West Chalakudy, Thrissur district, Kerala
- Country: India
- Denomination: Syro-Malabar Catholic Church
- Churchmanship: High church
- Website: Official website

History
- Status: Church
- Founder: Jose Vezhaparambil
- Dedication: Mother Mary
- Consecrated: 1966

Architecture
- Functional status: Active
- Architectural type: Modern
- Groundbreaking: 30 March 1963

Administration
- Diocese: Syro-Malabar Catholic Eparchy of Irinjalakuda
- Deanery: St. Mary's Forane Church, Chalakudy
- Parish: Our Lady of Perpetual Help Church parish

Clergy
- Vicar: Fr. Nixon Chakorya

The Church of the Our Lady of Perpetual Help, popularly known as Nithyasahaya Matha Palli or Moonjeli Palli is a parish church coming under the Syro-Malabar Catholic Eparchy of Irinjalakuda. It is situated along the Chalakudy - Ashtamichira Road, about 1 km from Chalakudi railway station at a small hamlet by name, Munjeli, in the south Indian state of Kerala. The parish falls under the jurisdiction of St. Mary's Forane, Chalakudy.

== Overview ==
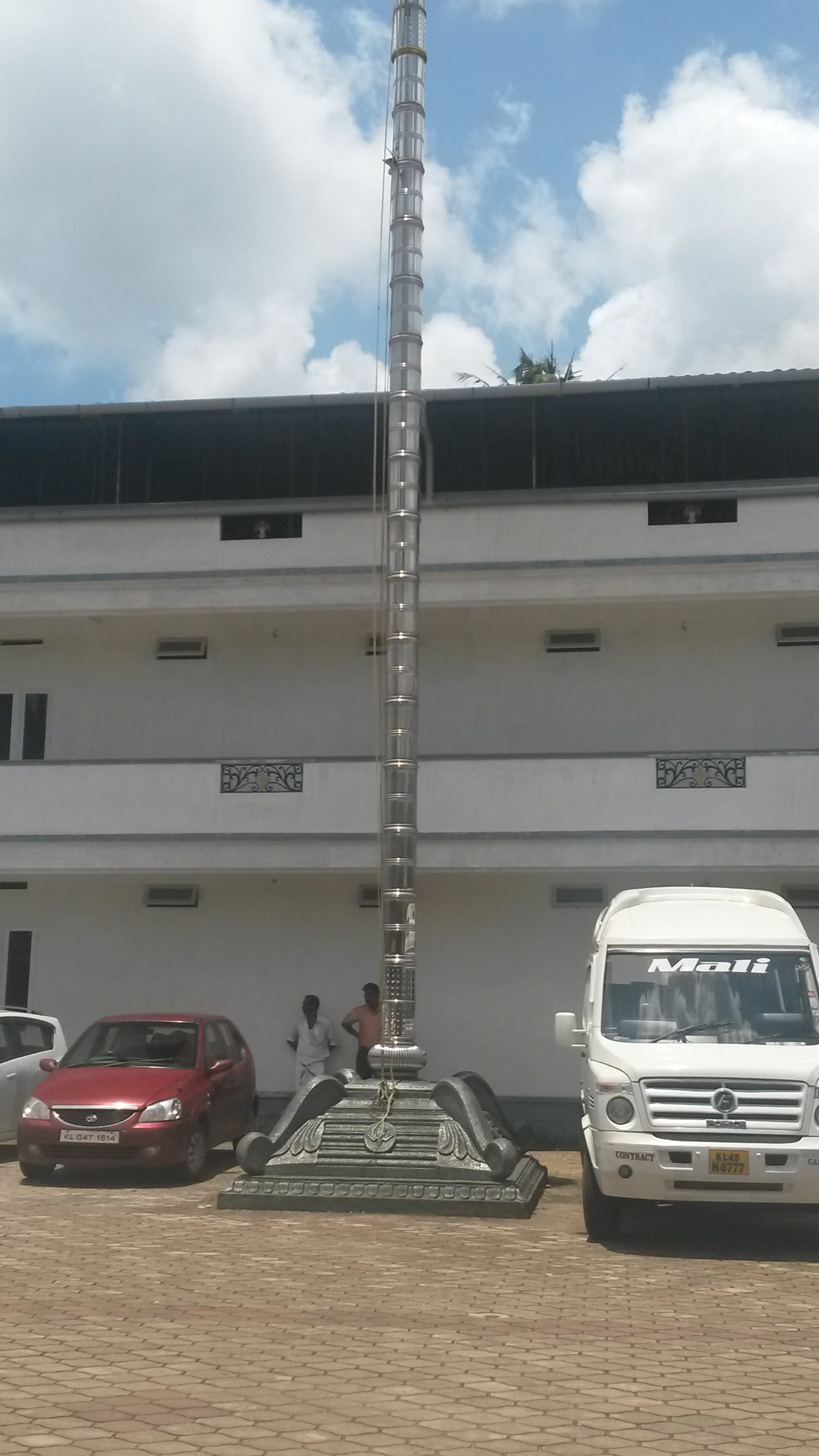
Flag post

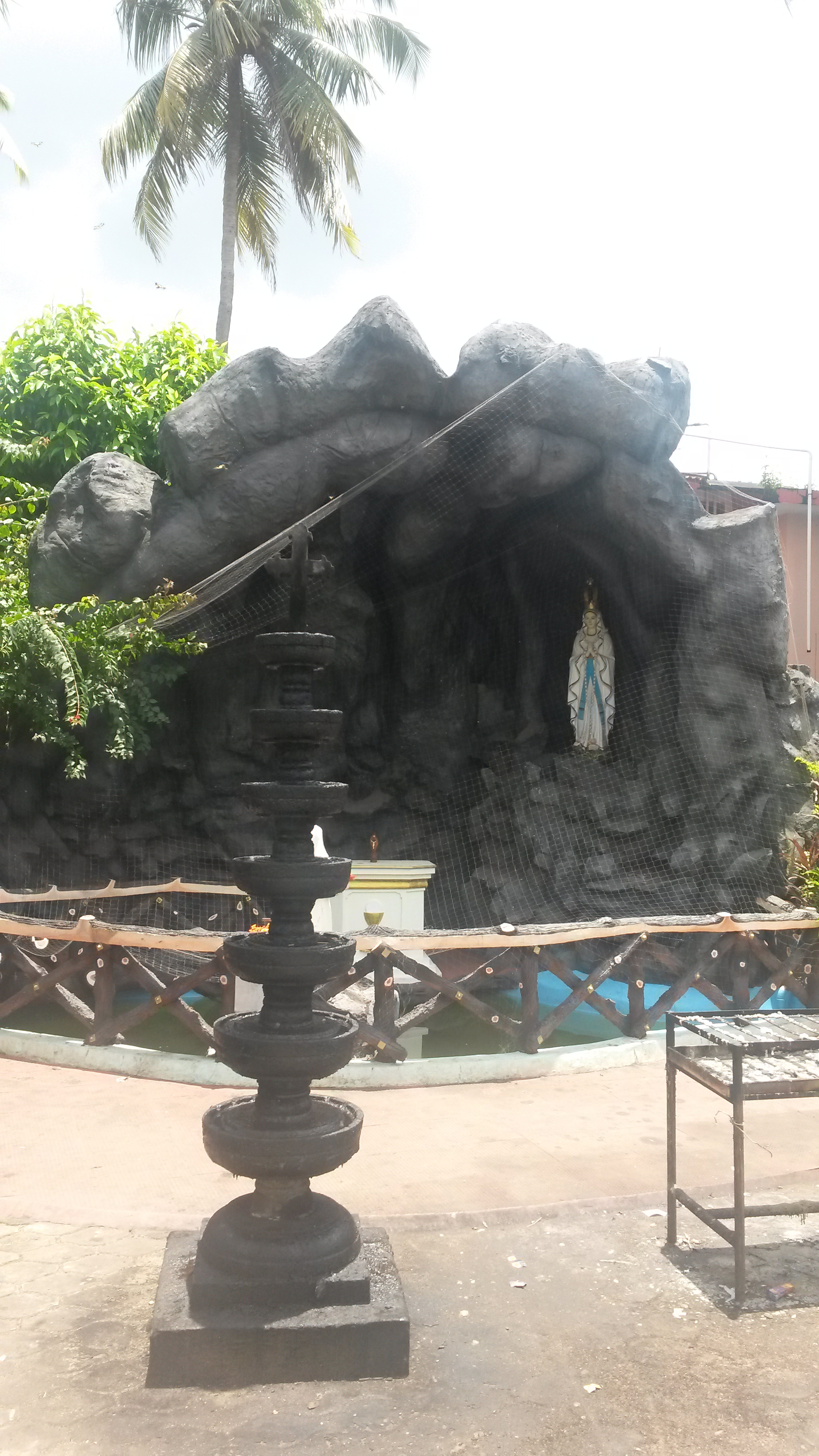
Grotto and the stone lamp

Our Lady of Perpetual Help church was consecrated in 1966 and serves as the home church of the local parish which was formed delinking the catholic families belonging to the Syro-Malabar Catholic Church and residing in West Chalakudy from the St. Mary's Forane Church, Chalakudy. As of 2015, the parish has a strength of 765 families and 3767 members.

Jose Vezhaparambil, a Catholic priest based at the Fransciscan Clarist Convent in Kottat, West Chalakudy, initiated the efforts to build the church in 1962 for the benefit of the local catholic families who came under the St. Mary's Forane Church, Chalakudy parish and the foundation stone of the church was laid on 30 March 1963 by George Alapatt, the then Bishop of the Diocese of Thrissur, (present day Syro-Malabar Catholic Archeparchy of Thrissur). The construction of the church was completed with financial assistance from the parent parish as well as from the local residents and was consecrated in 1966 with Joseph Mundassery as the founder vicar of the parish.

The parish had 432 families as its members at inception. Two years later, the cemetery was constructed which preceded several additions such as a new altar, concrete roof in place of the old tiled roof, mosaic flooring, vicarage and a parish hall. The church premises is home to a grotto dedicated to Mother Mary and the stone carved lamp in front of the grotto and the church flag post are inspired by Kerala temple architecture. The parish serves as the base for 4 priests, 56 nuns, and four male and three female novices. Twenty six Franciscans and 48 altar boys are also registered with the parish

== Activities ==
The main festival of the church is the Feast of Mother Mary which is celebrated every year on the first Sunday on or after 10 August. The festival includes special sermons, community activities and fireworks. The feast of Saint Sebastian is another major festival, celebrated annually on the last Sunday of January. The Oottu Perunal of Saint Joseph is also celebrated on 19 March which features public serving of food to the devotees.

The parish hosts several catholic organizations such as Kerala Catholic Youth Movement, Society of Saint Vincent de Paul, Family Apostolate, C.L.C., Mothers Union, Social Action and Franciscan Atmaya Saba. A primary school is run on the church premises for which a small school building has been constructed near the church cemetery. The church also conducts regular weekly catechism classes for the parish members and 26 volunteer teachers teach 665 students utilising the school class rooms for the purpose. A periodical under the name, Athmajyothi, is published by the parish and the community services are carried under the banners of twenty family unions. It is also home to St. Paul's Mission House.

== See also ==
- Syro-Malabar Catholic Eparchy of Irinjalakuda
- St. Mary's Forane Church, Chalakudy
