= Oratory of Our Mother of Perpetual Help =

- Location within San Jose, California
- 37°20′51″N 121°56′51″W
- Location: 1298 Homestead Road; Santa Clara, California
- Country: USA
- Denomination: Roman Catholic
- Churchmanship: Traditionalist Catholic

History
- Status: Oratory
- Dedication: Mater de Perpetuo Succursu

Architecture
- Functional status: Active

Administration
- Deanery: Deanery 3

The Oratory of Our Mother of Perpetual Help is a traditional Catholic oratory operating independently of the Diocese of San Jose.
