= Our Lady of Perpetual Help Cathedral, Niamey =

Coordinates: 13.5178°N 2.1106°E

Our Lady of Perpetual Help Cathedral
- Cathédrale Notre-Dame du Perpétuel Secours de Niamey
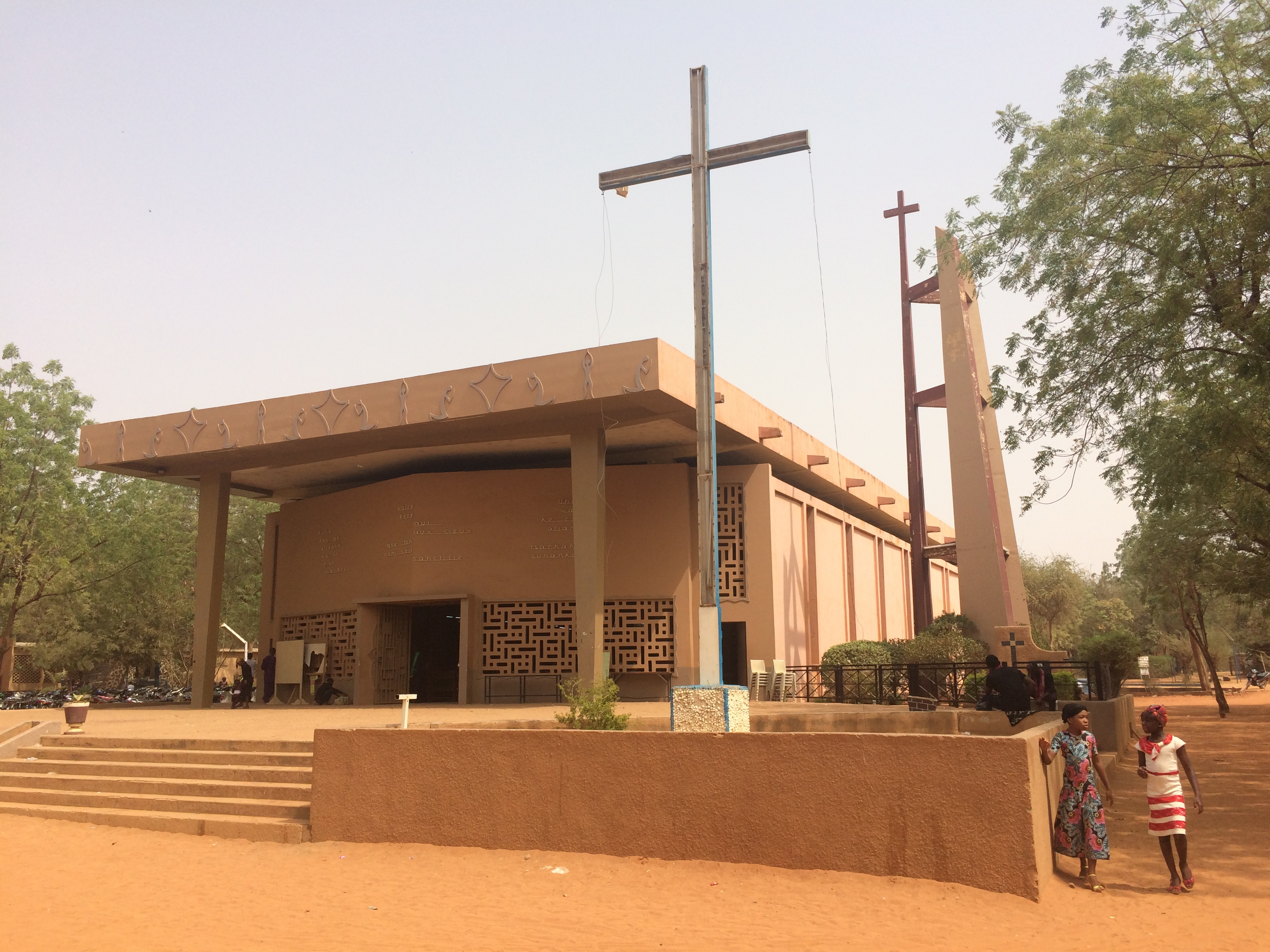
- Our Lady of Perpetual Help Cathedral
- Location: Niamey
- Country: Niger
- Denomination: Roman Catholic Church

The Our Lady of Perpetual Help Cathedral (French: Cathédrale Notre-Dame du Perpétuel Secours de Niamey) or simply Cathedral of Niamey, is a religious building of the Catholic Church located in Niamey, the capital city of the African country of Niger.

== History ==
The temple began as a parish church in 1931, in May 1948 adopted its current name of Perpetual Help. Follow the Roman or Latin rite and functions as the headquarters of the Metropolitan Archdiocese of Niamey (Archidioecesis Niameyensis) which was created in 2007 by Pope Benedict XVI through the bull "Cum Ecclesia Catholica".

In January 2015 an important safety device in the cathedral after several churches were attacked by Muslim radicals as a consequence of the publication of the satirical magazine Charlie Hebdo was deployed.

== See also ==
- Roman Catholicism in Niger
- Our Lady of Perpetual Help Church (disambiguation)
