= Saint Joseph of Cupertino Parish =

St. Joseph of Cupertino Parish
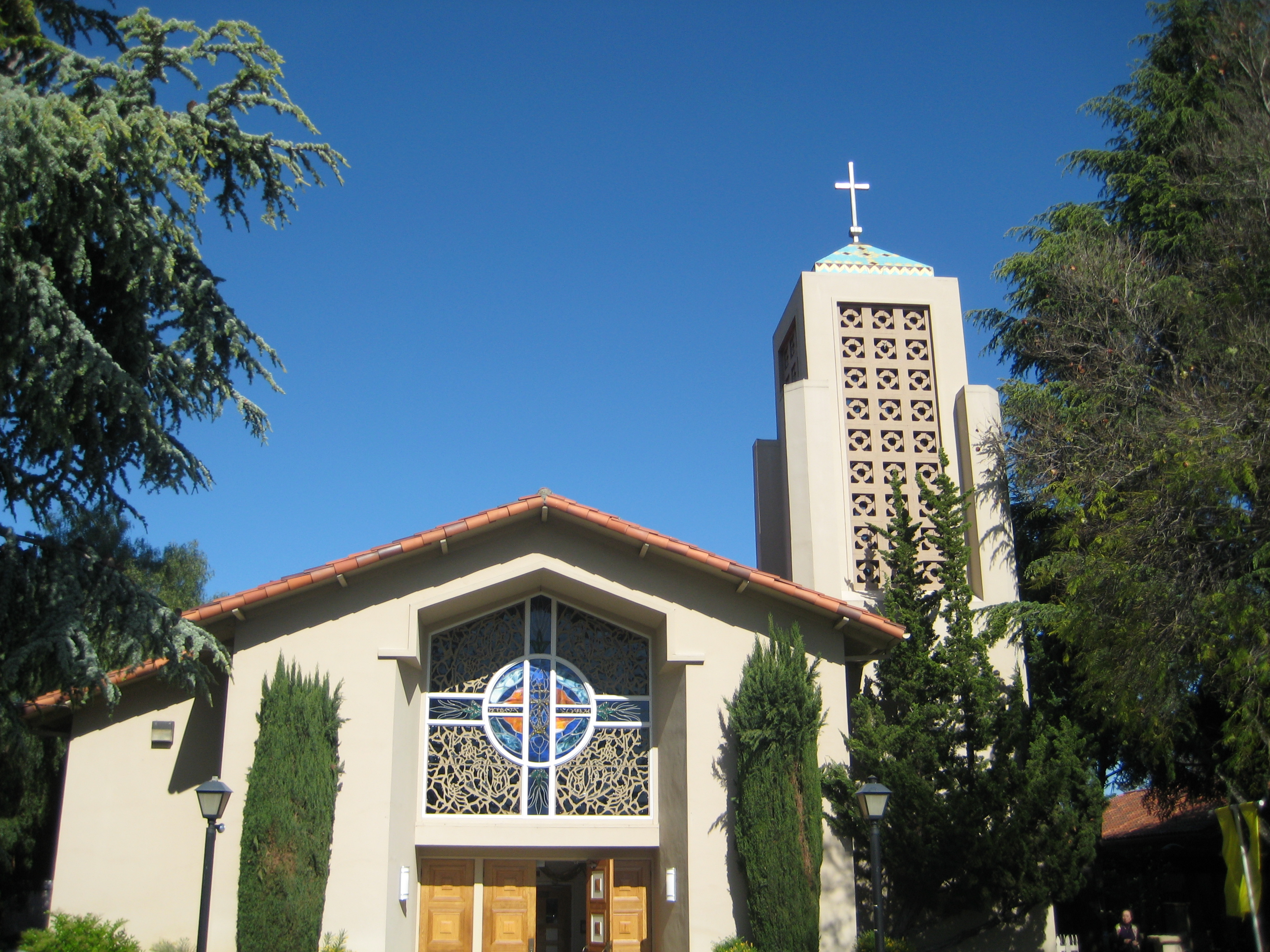
- Exterior view of St. Joseph of Cupertino Parish Church in Cupertino

- Location within San Jose, California
- 37°19′27″N 122°01′55″W
- Location: 10110 North De Anza Boulevard; Cupertino, California
- Country: USA
- Denomination: Roman Catholic
- Website: www.stjosephcupertino.org

History
- Status: Parish church
- Founded: April 12, 1953
- Founder: Rev. Msgr. Philip Ryan
- Dedication: Joseph of Cupertino
- Dedicated: August 2, 1953
- Events: Feast Day of St. Joseph of Cupertino, Confessor (September 18)

Architecture
- Functional status: Active

Administration
- Province: Ecclesiastical province of San Francisco
- Archdiocese: Archidioecesis Sancti Francisci
- Diocese: Dioecesis Sancti Josephi in California
- Deanery: Deanery 5

Clergy
- Bishop: The Most Rev. Oscar Cantú
- Vicar(s): Rev. Fr. Mendie Nguyen; Rev. Fr. Anthony Nguyen
- Dean: Rev. Gregory Ng Kimm (St. Mary of the Immaculate Conception Parish)
- Pastor: Rev. Fr. Michael Syjueco

Saint Joseph of Cupertino Parish is a territorial parish serving Latin Rite Catholics in Cupertino, California, United States. The parish is named for Joseph of Cupertino, and had its origin in a small wooden chapel at the Villa Maria retreat located in Stevens Creek Canyon (Stevens Creek was known in Spanish as Arroyo San José de Cupertino). Villa Maria was the country home of the Jesuit fathers of Santa Clara University, who purchased the 320-acre (130 ha) tract in 1873. Shortly thereafter, Brother Tom Cunningham cleared the land for orchards and vineyards and built a simple frame chapel of redwood, 18 by 25 feet (5x8 m), in the mission style, with buttresses and towers.

The parish moved to a location near the center of Cupertino, on De Anza Boulevard. The parish is now a part of the Diocese of San Jose in California. The pastor is Father Michael Syjueco.
