= Saint Athanasius Parish =

St. Athanasius Church
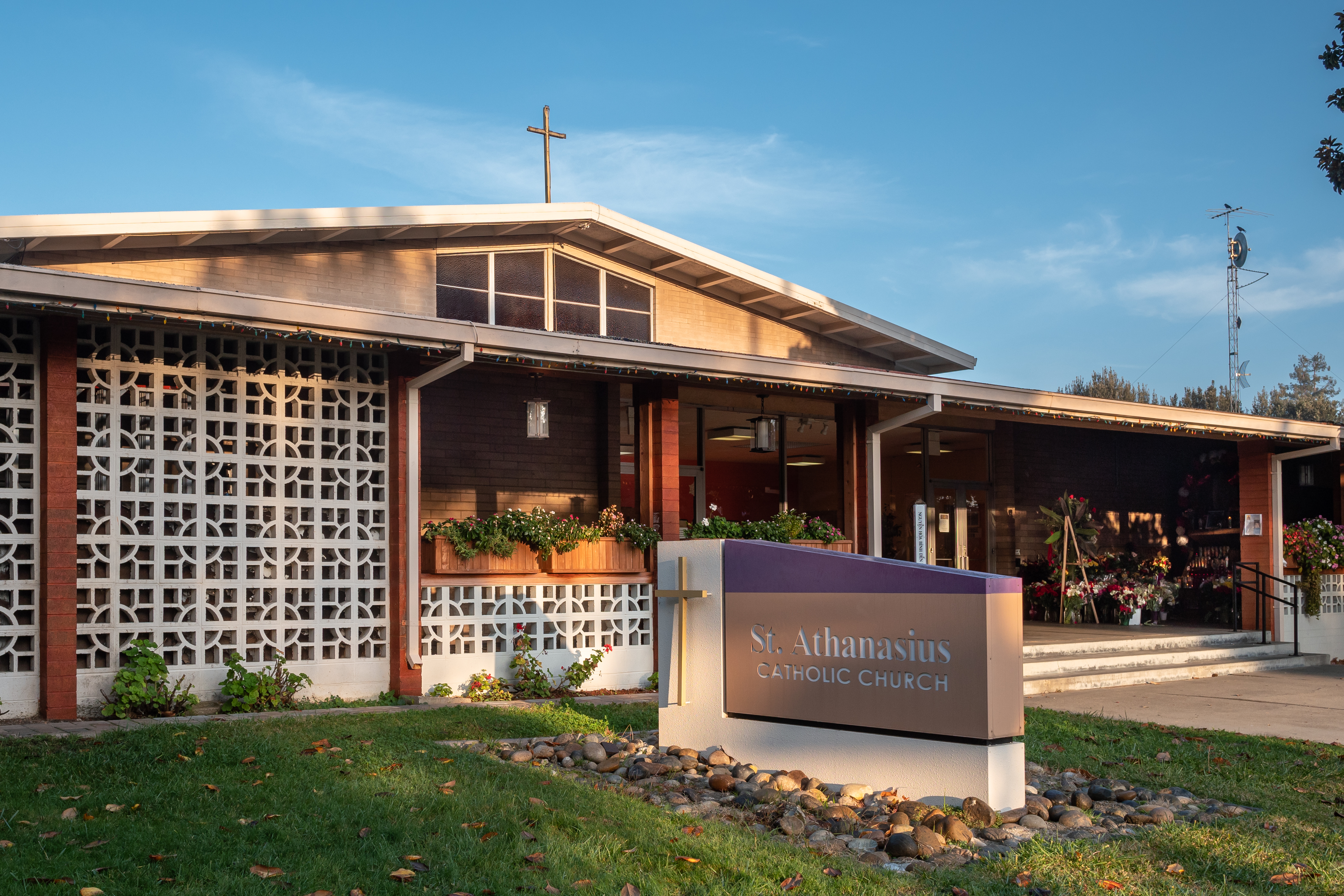

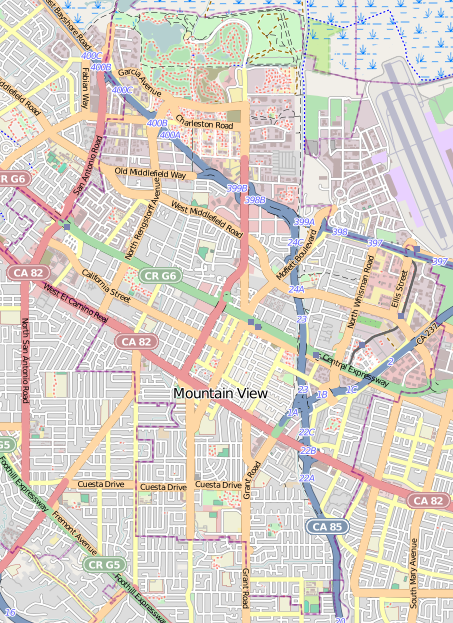
- Location within Mountain View, California Location within San Francisco Bay Area
- 37°24′16″N 122°05′49″W
- Location: 160 N. Rengstorff Avenue, Mountain View, California
- Country: United States
- Denomination: Catholic
- Website: stathanasiusparish.com

History
- Status: Parish church
- Founded: June 19, 1959; 67 years ago
- Founder: Rev. Fr. Leonard W. Bose
- Dedication: Athanasius of Alexandria
- Events: Feast Day of St. Athanasius of Alexandria, Bishop, Confessor, Doctor of the Church (May 2)

Architecture
- Functional status: Active

Administration
- Province: Ecclesiastical province of San Francisco
- Archdiocese: Archidioecesis Sancti Francisci
- Diocese: Dioecesis Sancti Josephi in California
- Deanery: Deanery 2

Clergy
- Bishop: The Most Rev. Oscar Cantú
- Vicar: Rev. Fr. Daniel Urcia
- Dean: Rev. Fr. Walter Suárez López
- Pastor: Rev. Fr. Walter Suárez López

Saint Athanasius Parish is a territorial parish of the Roman Catholic Diocese of San Jose in California. The parish was established June 19, 1959, by John J. Mitty, D.D., Archbishop of San Francisco, to serve Catholics of Mountain View and Palo Alto. The parish is named for Athanasius, Patriarch of Alexandria.

== Parish history ==
St. Athanasius parish was established June 19, 1959, at the direction of His Excellency John 1. Mitty, D.D., Archbishop of San Francisco to serve Catholics of Mountain View and Palo Alto. The founding pastor, Father Leonard W. Bose, was born January 16, 1917, to William A. Bose and Babete C. Schimmel- Bose, of San Francisco. After attending Saint Joseph's Seminary, Mountain View he went to Saint Patrick's Seminary Menlo Park, and was ordained March 20, 1943, by Archbishop Mitty in Saint Mary's Cathedral, San Francisco. Father Bose was first assigned to Burlingame. He served as associate pastor of Saint Catherine's Church until June, 1954. He also taught theology there. Two of his students were Sisters of Mercy who would aid him years later in Saint Athanasius. From Burlingame Father Bose went to Saint Brigid's in San Francisco and then to St. Mary's parish, Vacaville. He came to Saint Athanasius in June 1959. Father Bose celebrated the first Mass in Saint Athanasius on the first Sunday of Advent, November 29, 1959. He said the Mass in Latin with his back to the people, so they used missals, and those who happened to be sitting by the walls rested their missals on exposed two-by-fours. There was no kneeling, for the pews, beautiful old oaken benches that Father had salvaged from a warehouse in Burlingame, were too close together. They were filled, and people were standing. No heat, and there wouldn't be for several weeks. As Christmas drew near, it got cold, so when a heater was installed the same heater that now hangs in the corner of the multi-purpose room) there were many appreciative comments. With the cold came rain, and the onetime orchard, still unpaved, was churned into a sea of mud. Mass was offered in that modest structure for sixteen months.

== Succession of priests ==
Priest	Years of service	Years served	Role	Ordination
Fr. Leonard W. Bose	1959 - 1969	11	Pastor (founding)	
Fr. John J. Reilly	1969 - 1976	8	Pastor	
Fr. Kevin McArdle, C.S.Sp.	1976 - 1979	4	Pastor	
Fr. Joseph S. Prendergast, C.S.Sp.	1979 - 1988	10	Pastor	
Fr. John P. Cooper, C.S.Sp.	1988 - 1994	7	Pastor	
Fr. Diarmuid Casey, C.S.Sp.	1994 - 2009	16	Pastor	
Fr. Oscar D. Tabujara	2009 - Present	10	Pastor	Ordained December 22, 1975 as a Missionaire du Sacre Coeur. (MSC) by Bishop Antonio Fortich
Rev. Paul-Cuong Phan	? - Preset		Parochial Vicar	

Several of the priests who served St Athanasius have been from the Congregation of the Holy Spirit religious order, more commonly known as Holy Ghost Fathers.

== See also ==
- Monta Loma, Mountain View
