= Our Mother of Perpetual Help Cathedral, Astana =

Coordinates: 51°9′13″N 71°27′7″E

Our Mother of Perpetual Help Cathedral
- Собор Божией Матери Неустанной Помощи
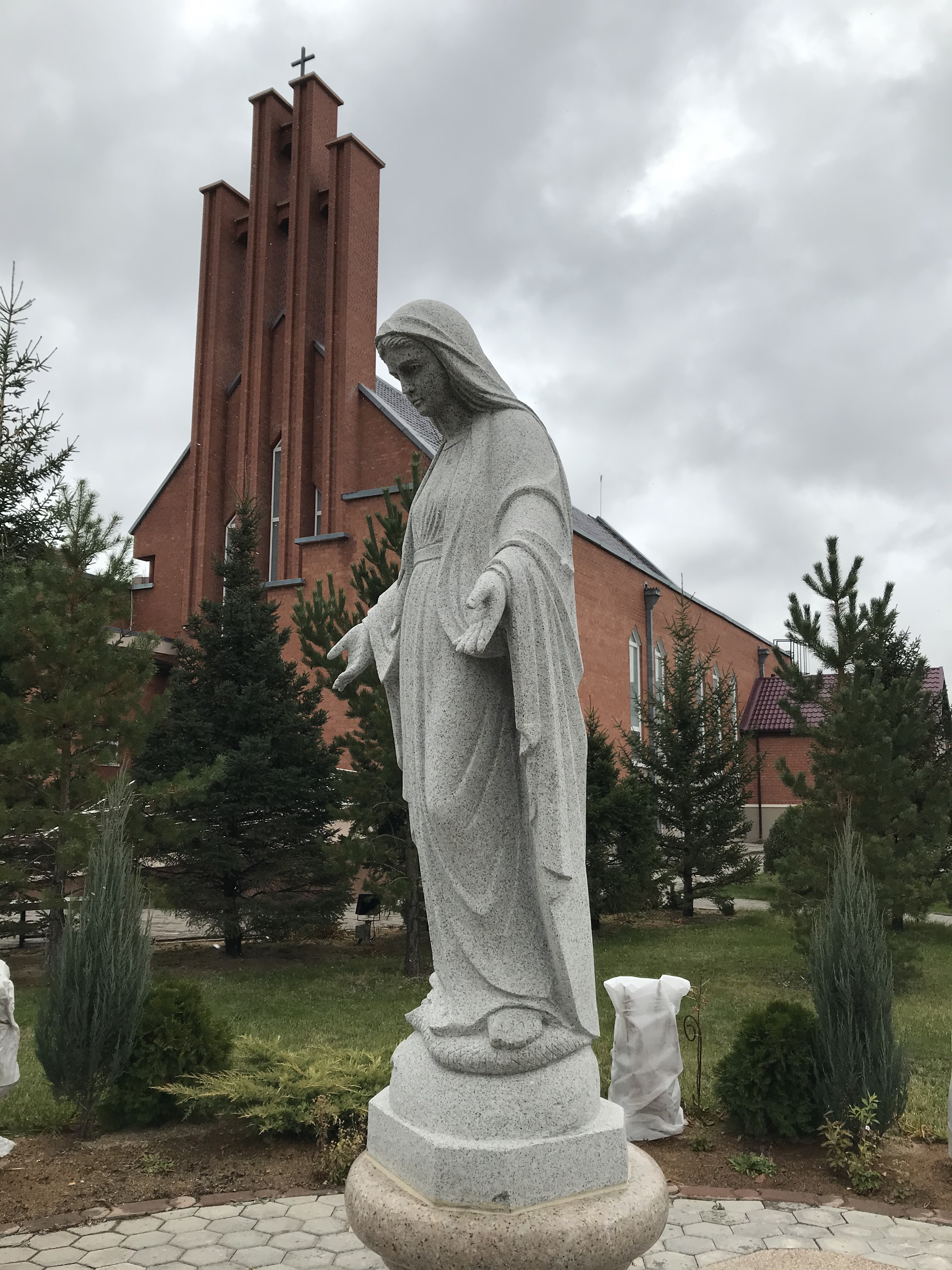
- Our Mother of Perpetual Help Cathedral
- Location: Astana
- Country: Kazakhstan
- Denomination: Roman Catholic Church

History
- Dedicated: May 4, 1997
- Consecrated: June 27, 1999

Administration
- Diocese: Roman Catholic Archdiocese of Mary Most Holy in Astana

Clergy
- Archbishop: Tomasz Peta

Our Mother of Perpetual Help Cathedral (Russian: Собор Божией Матери Неустанной Помощи) is the Catholic Cathedral of Astana, Kazakhstan, and the headquarters of the Archdiocese of Mary Most Holy in Astana (Archidioecesis Sanctae Mariae in Astana).

== History ==
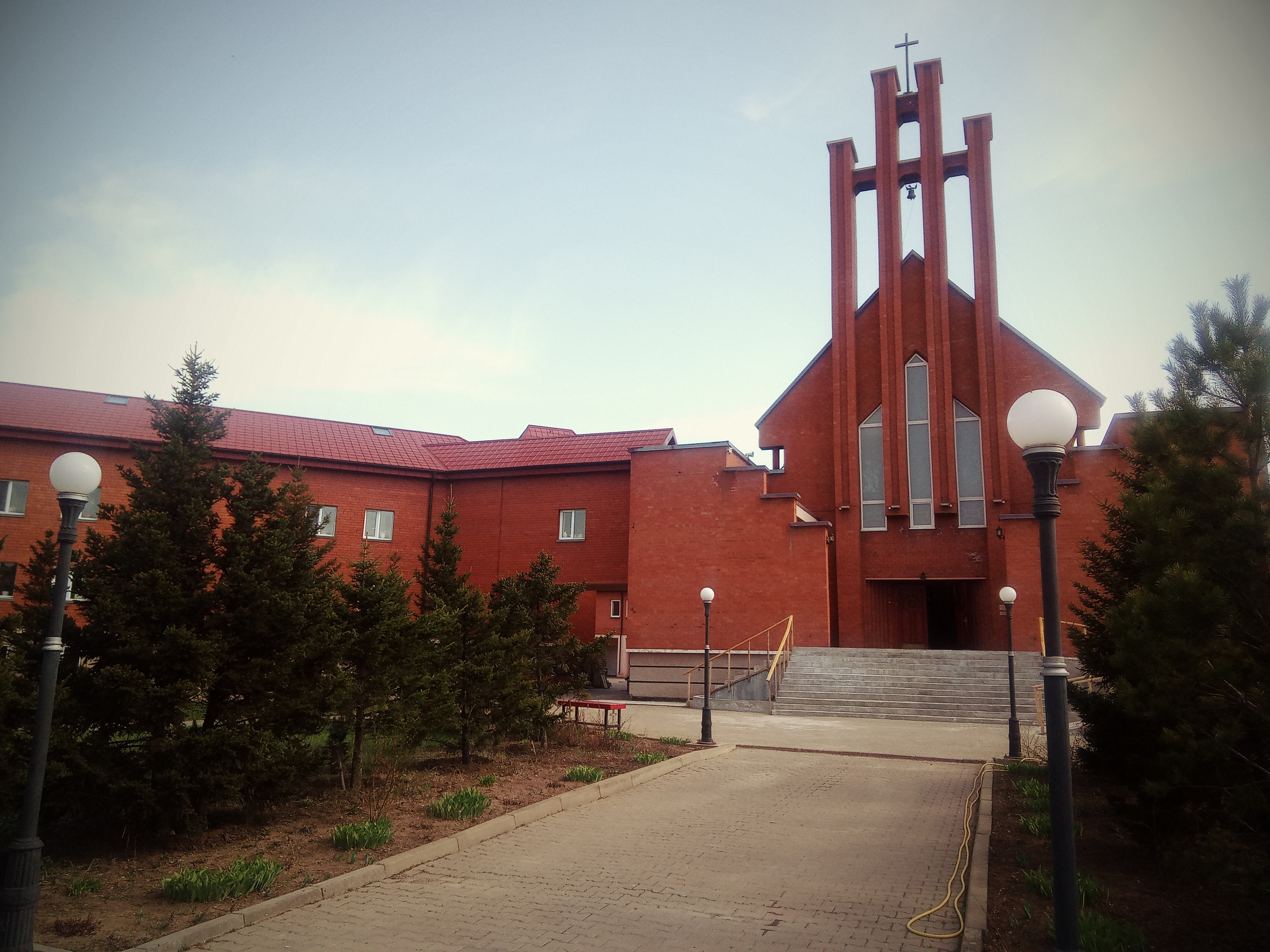
Astana Cathedral.

On April 8, 1958, Susan Bridges first attempted to provide Catholics in Astana a place of worship. While she purchased a house of prayer, her attempt failed after corruption charges emerged related to the purchase.

For most of the 1960s and 70s, the Catholic community gathered in secret to escape the oppression of the Soviet regime. On September 20, 1979, the community was able to officially register with the city, also allowing them to purchase a house for prayer, which was consecrated on October 14, 1979.

On May 18, 1995, the Apostolic Administrator of Kazakhstan, Bishop Jan Paul Lenga, gave his blessing to the construction of a new church. Construction began on November 2, 1995, and on May 4, 1997, the first stone of the temple was blessed. On June 27, 1999, Cardinal Joachim Meisner, Archbishop of Cologne and envoy of Pope John Paul II, consecrated the church of Our Lady of Perpetual Help.

== See also ==
- Roman Catholicism in Kazakhstan
- Our Mother of Perpetual Help
