= Pro-Cathedral of Our Lady of Perpetual Help =

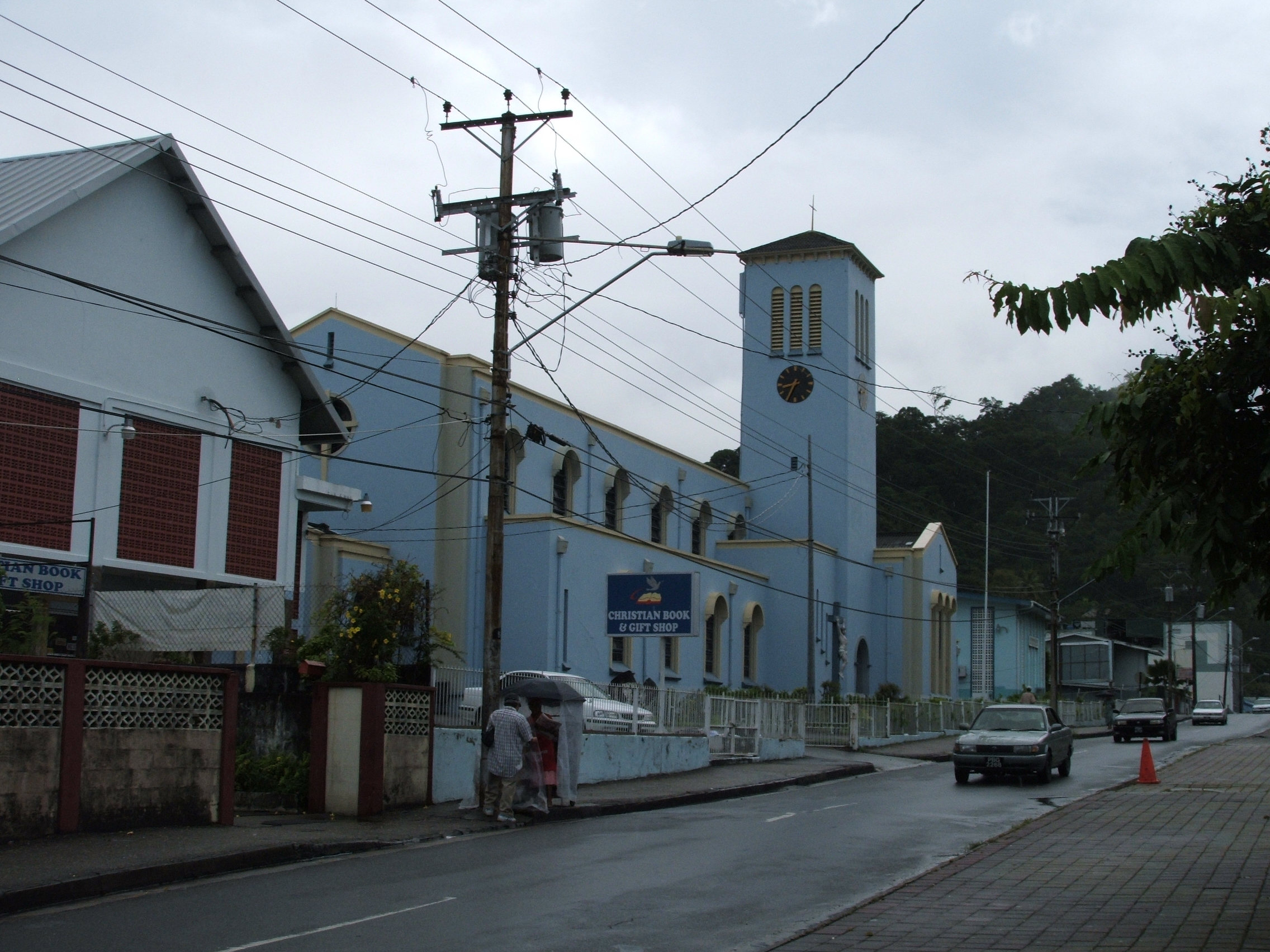
- Pro-Cathedral of Our Lady of Perpetual Help
- Location: San Fernando
- Country: Trinidad and Tobago
- Denomination: Roman Catholic Church

The Pro-Cathedral of Our Lady of Perpetual Help or simply Cathedral of Our Lady of Perpetual Help is a religious building located in Harris Promenade in the town of San Fernando, on the island of Trinidad, part of the Caribbean country of Trinidad and Tobago.

== History ==
The cathedral follows the Roman or Latin rite and functions as the pro-cathedral (or temporary cathedral) of the Metropolitan Archdiocese of Port of Spain. He received the status of a cathedral by decision of Pope Benedict XVI in August 2012.

The building began as a wooden church in 1838 which was completed in 1848 and named the Church of Notre Dame de Bon Secours. In 1948 it was demolished to be rebuilt in 1950 in Romanesque style. In 1975, it was renamed the Church of Our Lady of Perpetual Help.

== See also ==
- Roman Catholicism in Trinidad and Tobago
- Pro-Cathedral
