= 28th International Eucharistic Congress =

Catholic gathering in 1926

- General meeting at Soldier Field on June 21
- Date: June 20–24, 1926
- Location: Chicago, Illinois, United States
- Type: Eucharistic congress
- Organized by: Roman Catholic Archdiocese of Chicago

The 28th International Eucharistic Congress was held in Chicago, Illinois, United States from June 20 to 24, 1926. The event, held by the Catholic Church, was a eucharistic congress, which is a large scale gathering of Catholics that focuses on the Eucharist and other items of Catholic faith. The event was organized by Cardinal George Mundelein, the Archbishop of Chicago, and was the first International Eucharistic Congress held in the United States and the second held in North America. Cardinal Giovanni Bonzano served as the papal legate for the event. The event attracted a large number of people to the city, with most sources claiming at least several hundred thousand attendees. Large events were held throughout the area, at locations including Soldier Field, Holy Name Cathedral, and the Saint Mary of the Lake Seminary. Some sources claim that approximately 1 million people attended the closing day Mass held at the seminary in nearby Mundelein, Illinois.

The congress is considered a major event in the history of Chicago, with some historians comparing the size of the event to the city's world's fairs. It is also regarded as an important occurrence in the history of the Catholic Church in the United States, as it demonstrated the size and power of the church in the historically Protestant United States.

== Background ==
"Holy Father, permit the celebration of the next Eucharistic Congress to take place in Chicago and I promise you a million communions as a spiritual bouquet to your august presence."

— George Mundelein to Pope Pius XI, 1924.

Eucharistic congresses are largescale events held by the Catholic Church that focus on the Eucharist and involve discussions on Catholic theology and the importance of the sacrament. The events include liturgies and discussions regarding the real presence of Christ in the Eucharist. International Eucharistic Congresses have been held by the church since 1881. The first was held in France that year, and by 1926 there had been 27 congresses. All but one (Montreal in 1910) had been held in either Europe or Asia. In 1924, Cardinal George Mundelein asked Pope Pius XI to declare Chicago the host city for the next International Eucharistic Congress. In February the following year, Mundelein announced that the Pope had approved the proposition. At the July 1924 Eucharistic Congress in Amsterdam, the choice of Chicago for the 1925 was made official. With this, Chicago served as the first city in the United States to host a congress. The selection was also seen as a sign of the growing importance of Chicago, which, according to a 2019 article published by the University of Saint Mary of the Lake, was still considered "mission territory" until 1908. Mundelein also hoped that holding the congress in Chicago would demonstrate the strength of the Catholic Church in the city, where much of the political power was held by Protestant elites. At the time, Chicago was home to slightly over 3 million people, of whom 880,000 were Catholic, prompting historian Thomas Doherty to refer to the city as "the nation's most Catholic city."

== Preparations for the event ==
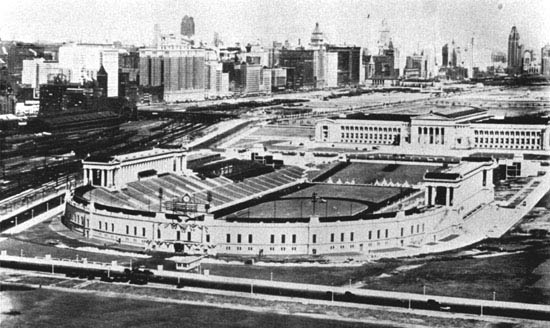
Soldier Field, one of the venues for the congress

altar at Soldier Field during the congress

In March 1925, Bishop Thomas Louis Heylen, the president of the Pontifical Committee for International Eucharistic Congresses traveled to the city to scout locations for the event and discuss transportation issues with railroad and steamship companies. That same year, Catholic American film censor Joseph Breen was appointed the publicity director for the congress. In January 1926, the South Park Commission agreed to allow the use of Soldier Field for several large masses during the event. At the time, the north end of the stadium was still partially under construction, with the planned formal opening of the stadium to be that year's Army–Navy Game in November. Modifications were made to the stadium to suit the needs of the congress, such as the construction of a sanctuary standing 30 feet (9.1 m) above the field measuring 214 feet (65 m) wide and 224 feet (68 m) long. This sanctuary would hold an altar covered by a golden baldacchino, topped with a Christian cross and supported by four large columns. This design was modeled off of the altar area at the Basilica of Saint Paul Outside the Walls in Rome. The north end of the altar consisted of a peristyle with alternating columns topped by either a cross or a bronze eagle, with laurel draped on the structure. A similar peristyle was erected near Chicago City Hall and the County Building. American flags were flown prominently throughout the stadium, which, according to historian Liam T. A. Ford, represented "Cardinal Mundelein's wish to emphasize the loyalty of U.S. Catholics to their country."

In February, the congress was discussed in a bulletin published by the National Catholic Welfare Conference, with dates for the event set for June 20–24 of that year. In the leadup to the event, Catholic officials from around the world began to make preparations for attending. A meeting of all the bishops in Poland occurred in March, where they selected a bishop, a priest, and a professor from the University of Lublin as their primary ambassadors, while in Mexico, church officials planned for what was later described in a 2009 book as their "largest pilgrimage ever to a foreign country". In all, over 900 Catholics from Mexico arrived in Chicago from chartered trains. In April, members of the German delegation had already arrived in the city and began actively planning their events for the congress. Among the venues that were used, the French delegation was to use the 16th Street Armory, the German delegation was assigned the Broadway Armory, and the Italian delegation used the Municipal Pier. The pier also hosted a Catholic art exhibition.

Also starting in early 1926, the Chicago Tribune, which had a history of publishing content with anti-Catholic sentiments, began publishing articles about the upcoming event in an uncharacteristically positive tone, with several articles written by Catholic priests. Various civic groups in the city, including the Chicago Association of Commerce, organized several dozen committees to prepare for the event, while transportation companies also made arrangements. For instance, the Chicago, Rock Island and Pacific Railroad announced that their trains transporting people to the congress would come equipped with a "special missionary mass kit" that contained equipment needed for a priest to perform mass, such as a chalice and vestments. Additional rail lines that serviced travelers to the congress included the Minneapolis, St. Paul and Sault Ste. Marie Railroad, the Chicago, Milwaukee and St. Paul Railroad, the Chicago and North Western Railroad, and the Chicago North Shore and Milwaukee Railroad. As part of the congress, over 3,000 priests were called to attend to confessions, and religious sisters were requested to make over 4.5 million hosts to be used during masses. Also during the congress, the Orchestra Hall movie theater in the city played The Miracle at Lourdes, a 1926 French film that dramatized the story of Our Lady of Lourdes.

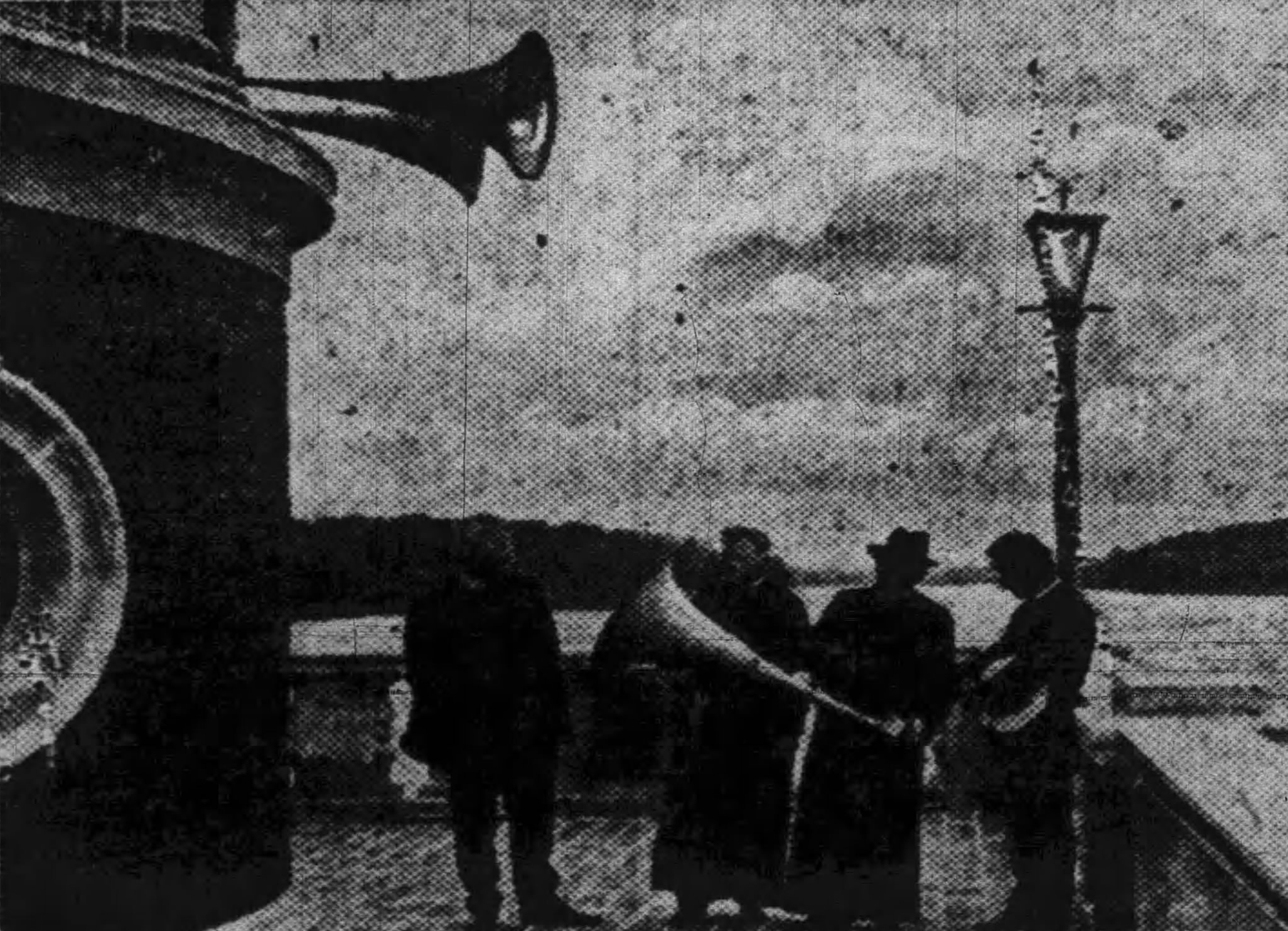
Priests examining one of the loudspeakers installed in Mundelein, Illinois

Loudspeakers, a relatively recent invention, were used installed for use at major venues such as Soldier Field (on the temporary alter erected there) and Mundelein, Illinois. The system of loudspeakers installed in Mundelein were described as the largest public address system that had ever been built up to that time.

== Papal delegation arrives ==
On June 6, a group consisting of 6 cardinals and 60 bishops, serving as the Pope's delegation to the congress, embarked from France to the United States aboard the RMS Aquitania. Cardinal Giovanni Bonzano, the leader of this delegation, was to serve as the papal legate for the congress. The delegation arrived in New York City on June 16 and were received by New York Governor Al Smith and New York City Mayor Jimmy Walker. They departed by train to Chicago from the city's Grand Central Terminal that same day. The delegation's presence caused a crowd of several thousand spectators at the terminal, and several thousand more spectators were present along the 960-mile (1,540 km) route from New York City to Chicago. The delegation reached Chicago the following day, (Note: In his 2014 book The Pope and Mussolini, historian David Kertzer claims that the cardinals arrived in Chicago on June 11. However, this is refuted by contemporary sources, including the program for the conference and an article in The New York Times, that state that the delegation arrived on June 17. Additionally, Kertzer gives the year for the congress as 1927 instead of 1926.) where they were received by Chicago Mayor William Emmett Dever and 35 city aldermen. Large crowds gathered to see the delegation, and while there was police presence to prevent disorder, multiple members of the crowd managed to kiss Bonzano's ecclesiastical ring. Bonzano was escorted by Mundelein to Holy Name Cathedral, where he gave a blessing. Speaking later to the Chicago Tribune, Bonzano had the following to say regarding the city and the importance of the event:

I join with the rest of the world in offering to Chicago my heartiest congratulations on the proud pinnacle of success to which it has attained. … From an outpost on the shore of Lake Michigan to her present size, she shows a development for which history has no parallel. … Her unprecedented growth offers a field for the utmost rational conjecture. Be that conjecture as each one wishes it, may not the selection of your city by the vicar of Christ for the first Eucharistic Congress in the United States indicate the beginning of its realization; for I consider no greater blessing has ever come to your city than the one the Holy Father conferred upon her when he selected Chicago for this congress.

A program for the congress listed the arrival of the papal legate as the "unofficial opening" of the congress. Before the event, the cardinals held a press conference at the Drake Hotel. On June 18, the papal delegation was formally welcomed at the Chicago Coliseum in an event attended by numerous elected officials and prominent citizens. A greeting from President of the United States Calvin Coolidge was read to a crowd of 12,000 gathered at the Coliseum by United States Secretary of Labor James J. Davis. Illinois Governor Len Small was also present, while business magnate Samuel Insull greeted the delegation on behalf of Protestants and non-Catholics. The following day, the delegation was given a sight-seeing tour of the city.

== Course of the event ==
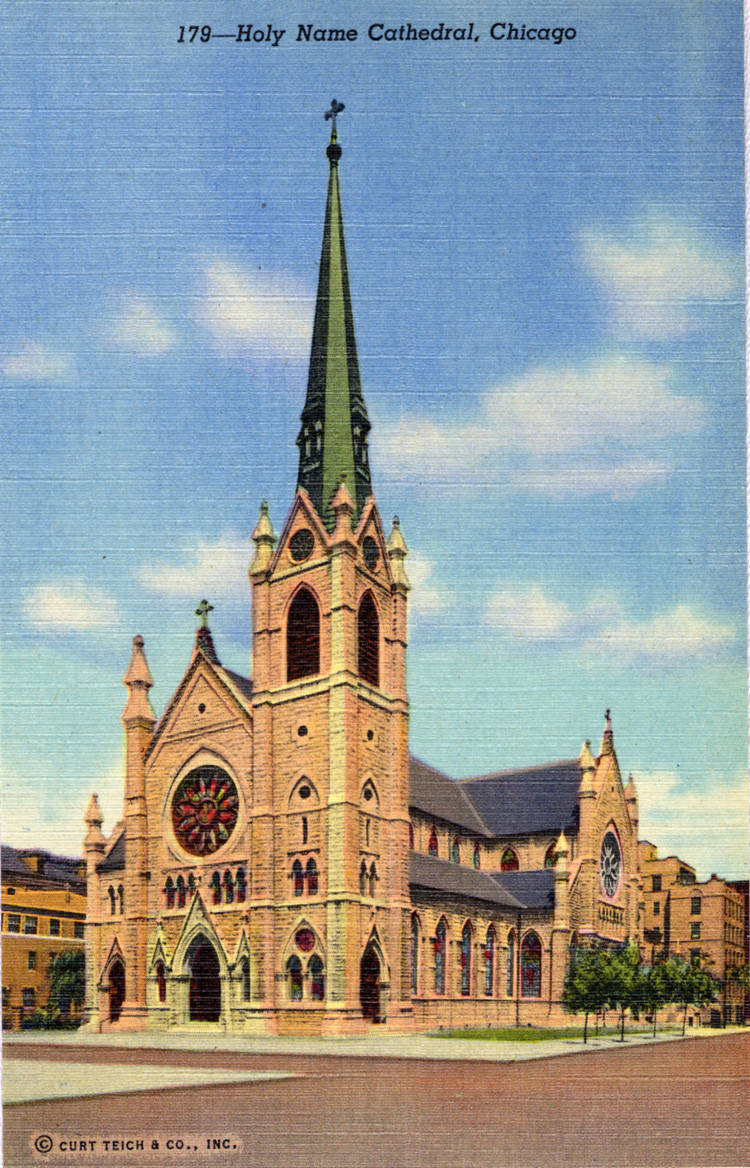
Holy Name Cathedral, site of the opening Mass for the congress

On June 20, a Sunday, at churches throughout the Roman Catholic Archdiocese of Chicago, over 260 bishops participated in holy hours, with the Chicago New World commenting that there was "a prelate for every pulpit". The congress officially began that day with a large procession that included representatives from all attending religious orders, 750 students from Quigley Preparatory Seminary, 500 monsignors, 300 bishops, 60 archbishops, and 10 cardinals. The procession was watched by approximately 250,000 spectators and was regarded as being one of the largest gathering of prelates in modern times outside of Rome. Loudspeaker, a relatively recent invention, were used in the procession, which was also broadcast via radio and aired at churches across the United States. The Chicago Symphony Orchestra, accompanied by a choir composed of choral members from both Saint Mary of the Lake and Quigley, performed for the congress's opening Mass at Holy Name Cathedral, playing a piece written by New York City-based composer Pietro Yon.

The second day, deemed Children's Day, featured a large mass held at Soldier Field. With over 400,000 participants either in the stadium or in the surrounding area, the mass featured a choir composed of 62,000 children. Dubbed by the Chicago New World as "the world's largest choir", the children represented 325 schools in the archdiocese, and they sang "Mass of the Angels", a piece from the 12th Century. Seminarians from Saint Mary of the Lake, accompanied by members of the Order of St. Gregory the Great and the Knights of Malta, led the procession for the mass. The third day, Women's Day, saw a general meeting held again at Soldier Field attended by approximately 250,000 women, which included approximately 20,000 religious sisters. Two choirs composed, respectively, of 6,000 nuns and 3,500 women members of local choirs sang a mass written by composer Vito Carnevali. In the evening, approximately 225,000 men (with approximately 50,000 more outside the stadium) processed into Soldier Field, each holding a candle, which was the only source of light as they listened to sermons. On June 23, deemed Higher Education Day, a mass written by Johann Baptist Singenberger was performed by 3,000 high school and college students.

June 24 was the final day of the congress, with closing events scheduled to take place at the campus of Saint Mary of the Lake Seminary (now known as the University of Saint Mary of the Lake) in nearby Mundelein, Illinois. (The town was named in honor of Cardinal Mundelein in 1925, and the university is also known as Mundelein Seminary.) The mass movement of people from Chicago to this nearby town was immense, with roads between Mundelein and Chicago temporarily becoming one-way roads. Approximately 18,000 cars traveled from Chicago to Mundelein, and 820 trains consisting of 5,200 train cars ran between the two cities, with one train arriving in Mundelein every 40 seconds over an 8-hour period. The Chicago North Shore and Milwaukee Railroad claimed that one of their trains were arriving in Mundelein every two minutes. Twelve first aid tents were set up around the campus, as were several drinking fountains. At 4 a.m., when the gates of the seminary opened, 12,000 were waiting to enter.

The Solemn Pontifical Mass was scheduled for 10 a.m. and was set to take place on the front steps of the seminary's chapel so that everyone in attendance could witness the Mass. In preparation for this, a crimson drape covered the front doors and served as a backdrop for a white altar erected on the front steps. Architect Joseph W. McCarthy, who had designed the seminary, worked with the organizers to design decorations for the event. The mass was said by Cardinals Bonzano and Patrick Joseph Hayes of the Roman Catholic Archdiocese of New York. The end of the congress came with a eucharistic procession, starting and ending at the chapel and going for about 3 miles (4.8 km) through the seminary. Acolytes spread rose petals in front of the procession, which was led by Bonzano holding the Blessed Sacrament. The procession stretched for nearly 2 miles (3.2 km) and consisted of 12 cardinals, 275 archbishops and bishops, and 100 monsignors, among many others. The Chicago Daily News, which covered the closing day ceremony, was able to print photographs of the event in their paper that same day by transporting the photographs via airplane. The poet Carl Sandburg was also in attendance throughout the congress as a journalist of the Chicago Daily News.

=== Newsreels ===
The congress as a whole was covered by two newsreel organizations, International Newsreel and Fox Film Corporation. Both companies gave private screenings of their footage to church officials, with Bonzano approving of the films and Cardinal Patrick O'Donnell of Ireland giving the films his blessing, and additional cuts with Italian intertitles were prepared for Pope Pius XI. Fox Film, in a deal brokered between the church and publisher Martin Quigley, created a full-length documentary for the event for which all profits would go to the Catholic Church, which also held the copyright to the film. The 96-minute movie, heralded by Doherty as "the first premapped feature-length record of an unfolding historical event", premiered at Al Jolson's Theater in New York City on November 8 before a sell-out crowd. A message from President Coolidge was delivered at the premiere by Secretary of Labor Davis, while president Will H. Hays of the Motion Picture Producers and Distributors of America also spoke.

== Attendance ==
While exact figures for the attendance at the congress are debatable, almost all sources agree that the congress attracted several hundred thousand attendees. In his request to Pope Pius XI, Mundelein stated that the congress would attract 1 million attendees. This number was repeated in a 1926 issue of Railway Age and subsequently claimed in a 2009 book by historian Liam T. A. Ford. A 1926 article published in The New York Times states that up to 1 million people were expected to attend the closing ceremony at Saint Mary of the Lake Seminary. A 2017 article in the Chicago Catholic similarly claims that "[a]bout 1 million people" attended the closing mass. However, a 1999 article in the National Catholic Register claims that the closing session was attended by approximately 850,000 people, while the opening session was attended by approximately 1.5 million individuals. A 2019 article published by the University of Saint Mary of the Lake uses a similar value of "more than 800,000" attendees at the closing ceremony. In a 2007 book, historian Thomas Doherty claims that the city at the time was home to approximately 880,000 Catholics and attracted over 500,000 additional Catholics to the city. According to contemporary records from the Chicago New World, approximately 8.3 million people participated in the congress from the arrival of the papal delegation on June 17. However, this number is most likely inflated due to double counting.

== Impact and legacy ==
The congress was considered a significant moment in the history of the Catholic Church in the United States. Doherty claims that "[f]or American Catholics, the 28th International Eucharistic Congress was more than a celebration of faith. It was a graduation ceremony." He argues that the success of the event helped push Catholics in the country from the margins of society to the mainstream. A 2000 article in the Chicago Tribune echoes these sentiments, stating that "the 1926 Eucharistic Congress ushered in an era of cultural power and institutional success for the church in Chicago". The University of Saint Mary of the Lake claims that this event, along with the World's Columbian Exposition in 1893 and the Century of Progress world's fair of 1933–34, "put Chicago 'on the map' in its early life." Doherty makes a similar connection between the congress and the city's world's fairs, saying "Not since the storied World's Columbian Exposition of 1893 had the Second City hosted such first-class festivities." Ford claims that a mass held at Soldier Field during the congress may actually hold the record for largest single event held at the stadium, a record officially held by a Catholic Holy Hour event that happened in 1954.

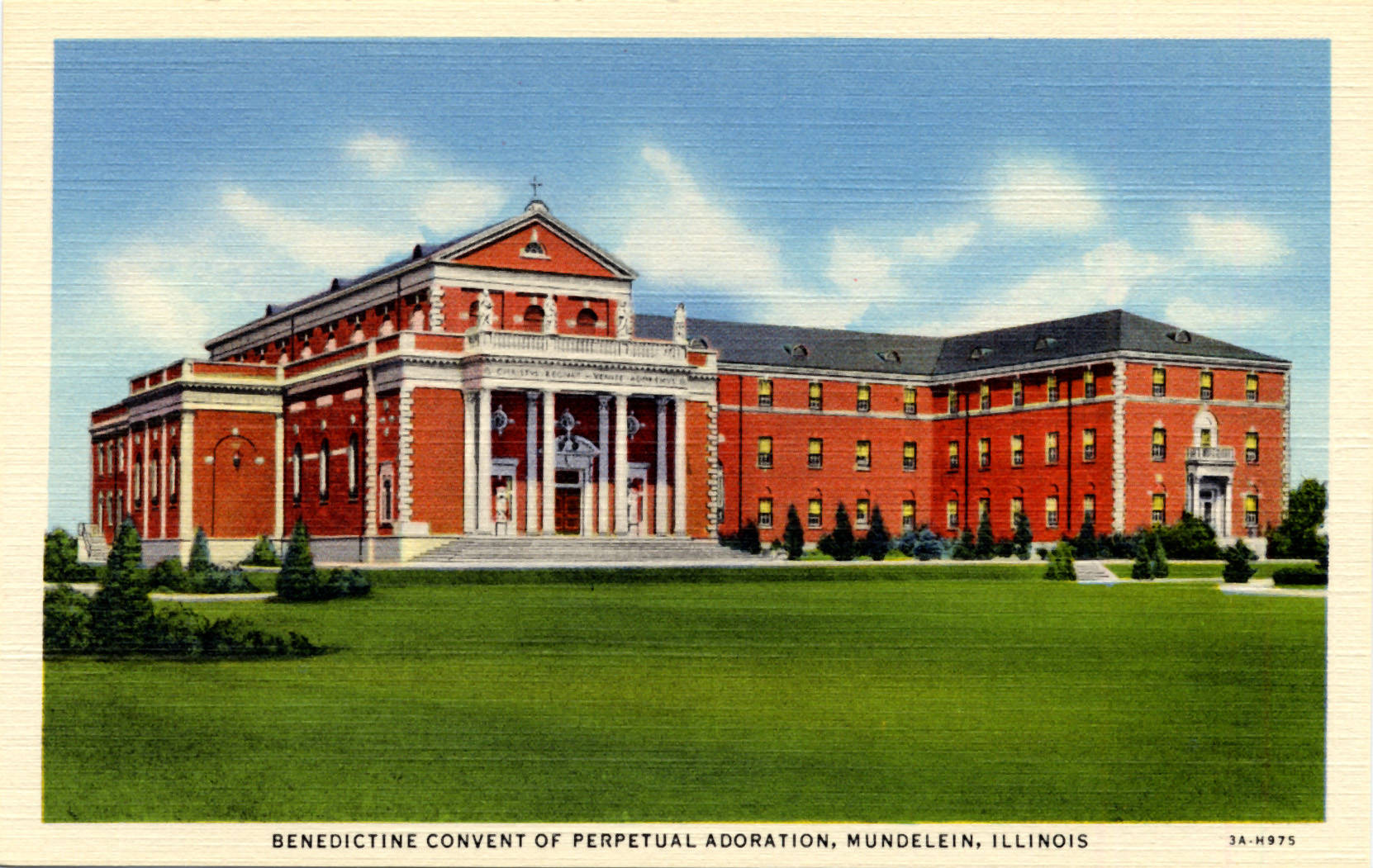
Convent for the Benedictine Sisters in Libertyville, Illinois

Following the congress, the Benedictine Sisters of Perpetual Adoration were invited to build a chapel near the Saint Mary of the Lake campus in Libertyville, Illinois. The chapel, called Our Lady of the Blessed Sacrament Chapel, was completed in 1932. In 1978, the chapel became the home for Conventual Franciscans who bought the chapel from the sisters and continue to operate it today. The chapel is also the national center for the Militia Immaculata.

While attending the congress, Bishop Philip R. McDevitt of the Roman Catholic Diocese of Harrisburg convinced bishops from Ireland that a eucharistic congress could be beneficial for their country, ultimately leading to Dublin hosting the 31st International Eucharistic Congress in 1932.

== Sources ==
- "1926 Eucharistic Congress brings 'sense of wonder'". Chicago Catholic. September 6, 2017. Archived from the original on September 12, 2017.
- "1926 Eucharistic Congress brought 'sense of wonder'". Chicago Catholic. November 8, 2018. Archived from the original on October 31, 2020.
- Doherty, Thomas (2007). Hollywood's Censor: Joseph I. Breen and the Production Code Administration. Columbia University Press. ISBN 978-0-231-51284-8 – via Google Books.
- "Eucharistic Congress, Chicago Daily News, 1926". Encyclopedia of Chicago. Archived from the original on February 21, 2020.
- Ford, Liam T. A. (2009). Soldier Field: A Stadium and Its City. University of Chicago Press. ISBN 978-0-226-25709-9 – via Google Books.
- Kane, Gerry (June 2007). "The Eucharistic Congress 1932". The Furrow. 58 (6): 343–346. ISSN 0016-3120. JSTOR 27665556.
- Kertzer, David I. (2014). The Pope and Mussolini: The Secret History of Pius XI and the Rise of Fascism in Europe. Random House. ISBN 978-0-679-64553-5 – via Google Books.
- Kloehn, Steve (June 22, 2000). "Catholic Rally Holds Echoes of the Past". Chicago Tribune. Tribune Publishing.
- Lindberg, Richard C. (2020). Tales of Forgotten Chicago. Southern Illinois University Press. ISBN 978-0-8093-3781-1 – via Google Books.
- McMahon, Charles A. (February 1926). "The XXVIII International Eucharistic Congress to be Held in Chicago June 20–24, 1926". National Catholic Welfare Conference Bulletin. VIII (9). National Catholic Welfare Conference: 6 – via Google Books.
- "Program of the XXVIII International Eucharistic Congress to be Held in Chicago, June 20–24, 1926". National Catholic Welfare Conference Bulletin. VIII (1). National Catholic Welfare Conference: 4. June 1926 – via Google Books.
- Pronechen, Joseph (March 28, 1999). "Marytown a Eucharistic Town". National Catholic Register. Archived from the original on March 3, 2021.
- "Over a Million Expected to Attend Eucharistic Congress". Railway Age. 80 (27). Simmons-Boardman Publishing: 1496. June 5, 1926 – via Google Books.
- "City and State Pay Official Tribute to Visiting Cardinals". The New York Times. June 16, 1926. ISSN 0362-4331.
- "200,000 in Chicago to Greet Cardinals Now Speeding West". The New York Times. June 17, 1926. ISSN 0362-4331. Archived from the original on February 25, 2018.
- "Coolidge Greeting Read to Cardinals at Civic Welcome". The New York Times. June 19, 1926. ISSN 0362-4331.
- "Thousands Flocking to Mundelein Rites". The New York Times. June 24, 1926. ISSN 0362-4331.
- "Chicago Population Put at 3,058,992". The New York Times. September 17, 1926. ISSN 0362-4331.
- "Chicago Population at 3,151,989". The New York Times. December 25, 1926. ISSN 0362-4331.
- "Bouquet". Time. Time Inc. May 31, 1926. ISSN 0040-781X.
- "XXVIII International Eucharistic Congress – When 800,000 People Prayed at Mundelein". University of Saint Mary of the Lake. June 25, 2019. Archived from the original on February 17, 2020.
