= Diocese of Hamhung =

Latin Catholic diocese in North Korea

Coordinates: 39.9160°N 127.5340°E

Diocese of Hamhung Dioecesis Hameungensis 함흥 교구

Location
- Country: North Korea
- Ecclesiastical province: Seoul
- Metropolitan: Seoul

Statistics
- Area: 49,375 km^{2} (19,064 sq mi)
- Population: unknown

Information
- Denomination: Catholic Church
- Rite: Roman Rite
- Established: August 5, 1920

Current leadership
- Pope: Leo XIV
- Bishop: Sede vacante
- Metropolitan Archbishop: Andrew Yeom Soo-jung
- Apostolic Administrator: Simon Kim Ju-young

Map

The Diocese of Hamhung is a diocese of the Latin Church of the Catholic Church in North Korea.

Originally erected as the Apostolic Vicariate of Wonsan in 1920, the name has been changed twice, once to Kankoensis o Hameungensis in 1940, and finally, as the Apostolic Vicariate of Hamhung in 1950. Like the Diocese of Pyongyang, the Vicariate was elevated to a full diocese in 1962. The diocese is a suffragan of the Archdiocese of Seoul.

== Persecutions ==
In 1949, 166 priests and religious were martyred in the Communist revolution of Kim Il Sung. This left the diocese bereft of priests. Bishop Boniface Sauer, the abbot of Tokwon Abbey, had died in 1950, and no bishop had been re-appointed to the diocese. Finally, in 1962, Timotheus (Franz Xaver) Bitterli, was appointed in absentia as the bishop of the diocese, and was the apostolic administrator for 20 years until his resignation in 1981. Since then, the diocese has remained vacant, and it will likely remain so as long as the persecution of Christians in North Korea continues.

== Ordinaries ==
=== Vicars Apostolic of Hamheung ===
- Bonifatius Sauer, OSB (1920-1950)
- Timotheus Bitterli, OSB (1950–1962; apostolic administrator)

=== Bishops of Hamhung ===
- Timotheus Bitterli, OSB (1962–1981; apostolic administrator)
- Abbot Placidus Lee Dong-ho (1981–2005; apostolic administrator)
- John Chang Yik (2005–2010; apostolic administrator)
- Luke Kim Woon-hoe (2010–2020; apostolic administrator)
- Simon Kim Ju-young (2020–present; apostolic administrator)

== See also ==
- Catholic Church in North Korea
- Religion in North Korea
- Territorial Abbey of Tokwon
