= John Edward Morris =

20th-century American Catholic bishop

The Reverend Monsignor John Edward Morris M.M.
- Prefect of Peng-yang
- See: Peng-yang, Korea
- In office: 1930-1936

Orders
- Ordination: 13 June 1914

Personal details
- Born: 1 January 1889
- Died: 10 July 1987 (aged 98)
- Denomination: Roman Catholic

John Edward Morris, M.M. (1889–1987) was an American Roman Catholic priest who served as the Prefect of Peng-yang in Korea from 1930 to 1936.

Born in the United States on 1 January 1889, Morris was ordained a priest for the Roman Catholic Diocese of Fall River in Massachusetts on 13 June 1914. For seven years after his ordination, he was curate in St. Joseph’s Parish, Fall River, and then joined Maryknoll. He was solemnly professed a member of the Catholic Foreign Mission Society of America on 31 January 1921. The missionary society assigned him to teach at Vénard Preparatory College at Clarks Summit, Pennsylvania. He then started working as a speaker and preacher in American parishes, making the Maryknoll cause known to American Catholics. In November of 1923 he was sent to work in his congregation's Korean Mission.

Pope Pius XI appointed him the Prefect of Peng-yang on 1 April 1930. After six years of pastoral care to the prefecture, he resigned the post on 31 July 1936.

Morris died on 10 July 1987, aged 98.

== Literature ==
Lee Chŏngsoon and Lee, Tae Ho, eds.: Father John E. Morris, M.M. The Second Prefect Apostolic of Peng Yang, Korea & Founder of the Sisters of Our Lady of Perpetual Help (Seoul: Sisters of Our Lady of Perpetual Help, 1994).

Catholic Church titles
Preceded by Patrick James Byrne	Prefect of Peng-yang; 1930–1936	Vacant Title next held by William O'Shea as Vicar Apostolic of Heijo
