= William O'Shea (bishop) =

William Francis O'Shea M.M.
- Vicar Apostolic of Heijo
- Church: Catholic Church
- See: Vicariate Apostolic of Heijo
- In office: July 11, 1939 – April 17, 1944
- Predecessor: John Edward Morris
- Successor: Francis Hong Yong-ho
- Other post: Titular Bishop of Naissus (1939-1945)

Orders
- Ordination: December 5, 1917 by Thomas Cusack
- Consecration: October 29, 1939 by Pope Pius XII

Personal details
- Born: December 9, 1884 Greenwich Village, New York City, New York, United States
- Died: February 22, 1945 (aged 60)

Styles of William Francis O'Shea, M.M.
- Reference style: The Most Reverend
- Spoken style: Your Excellency
- Religious style: Bishop

William Francis O'Shea, M.M. (December 9, 1884 – February 22, 1945) was an American Roman Catholic bishop who served as the Vicar Apostolic of Heijo in Korea from 1939 to 1944.

Born in Greenwich Valley of New York City, New York, United States on December 9, 1884, he was ordained a priest for the Catholic Foreign Mission Society of America on December 5, 1917. O'Shea was appointed the Vicar Apostolic of Heijo and Titular Bishop of Naissus on July 11, 1939. He was consecrated by Pope Pius XII on October 29, 1939, with archbishops Celso Benigno Luigi Costantini and Henri Streicher serving as co-consecrators.

O'Shea resigned on April 17, 1944 and died on February 22, 1945, aged 60.

Catholic Church titles
Vacant Title last held by John Edward Morris as Prefect of Peng-yang	Vicar Apostolic of Heijo; 1939–1944	Vacant Title next held by Francis Hong Yong-ho
New title	Titular Bishop of Naissus; 1939–1945	Succeeded by Henri Routhier
