= Patrick James Byrne =

American-born Maryknoll missionary and bishop

Servant of God Patrick James Byrne M.M.
- Apostolic Delegate to Korea
- Church: Roman Catholic Church
- Appointed: April 7, 1949
- Term ended: November 25, 1950
- Successor: Egano Righi-Lambertini
- Other post: Titular Bishop of Gazera
- Previous posts: Prefect Apostolic of Pyongyang (1927–1929); Prefect Apostolic of Kyoto (1937–1940); Apostolic Visitor to Korea (1947-1949)

Orders
- Ordination: June 23, 1915 by Giovanni Bonzano
- Consecration: June 14, 1949 by Thomas John McDonnell

Personal details
- Born: Patrick James Byrne; October 26, 1888 Washington, D.C., USA
- Died: November 25, 1950 (aged 62) Hachangri, North Korea
- Education: St. Mary's Seminary and University

Patrick James Byrne, M.M. (October 26, 1888 – November 25, 1950) was an American-born Catholic missionary who served as Apostolic Delegate to Korea from 1949 until his death in 1950.

A member of the Maryknoll Society, Byrne was assigned to missions in Korea and Japan. He served as the prefect apostolic of Pyongyang from 1927 to 1929, prefect apostolic of Kyoto from 1937 to 1940, apostolic visitor to Korea from 1947 to 1949, and the apostolic delegate to Korea from 1949 to 1950.

Byrne died in North Korean captivity in 1950. His cause for sainthood was opened in 2013.

== Early life ==
=== Childhood ===
Patrick Byrne was born on October 26, 1888, in Washington, D.C. to Patrick and Anna Seale Byrne, both Irish immigrants. The elder Patrick supervised the bindery in the Government Printing Office in Washington. When the younger Patrick turned five-years-old, he was sent to live with his Aunt, Eliza O'Neil in Auburn, New York. In 1895, he entered the Holy Family School in Auburn. Uninterested in sports and outdoor activities, Byrne's favorite activity was reading. He served as an altar boy at Holy Family Church.

When his Aunt Eliza died in 1905, the 16-year-old Byrne returned to Washington. He entered Eastern High School in Washington for the 11th grade. In 1908, while sailing with his brother Ernest on a small boat on Chesapeake Bay, the boys encountered sudden high winds. Ernest was swept overboard and was lost at sea. The trauma of this event convinced Byrne that he needed to accomplish something substantial for others in his life. He decided that the best way was to become a priest and serve as a missionary in Asia.

=== Preparation for priesthood ===
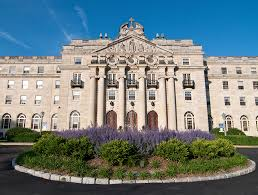
St. Mary's Seminary, Baltimore, Maryland (2022)

Following his mother's wishes, Byrne entered St. Charles College in Ellicott City, Maryland, the minor seminary run by the Sulpicians. It prepared teenage seminarians for St. Mary's Seminary, the major seminary for the Archdiocese of Baltimore in Baltimore. Bryne impressed his teachers and fellow students with his sense of humor and sharp intellect.

Byrne entered St. Mary's in 1909, starting with studies in philosophy. Two years later, he moved to studies of theology. During this time, he attended talks by four priests who were planning to establish the first foreign missionary society in the United States, the Maryknoll Society. Their plans meshed with Byrne's goal of becoming a missionary. During the winter of 1912, Bryne was briefly hospitalized. His mother died while he was at St. Mary's, thus removing any hesitation about leaving home for an extended period.

== Priesthood ==
=== Service in United States ===
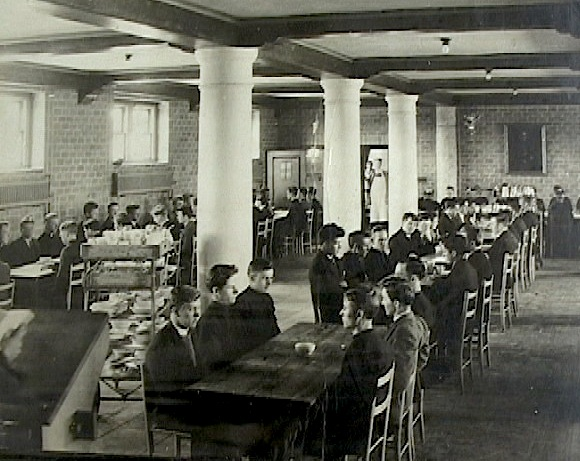
Venard Seminary, Clarks Summit, Pennsylvania (circa 1918)

Byrne was ordained a priest by Cardinal Giovanni Vincenzo Bonzano in the chapel of the Dominican House of Studies in Washington for the Archdiocese of Baltimore on June 23, 1915.A week after his ordination, Byrne was given permission by Cardinal James Gibbons of Baltimore to enter the Maryknoll Society

In September 1916. Bryne was named as an assistant to James Anthony Walsh, a co-founder of the Maryknoll Society. After the United States entered World War I in April 1917, Byrne told Walsh that he was willing to volunteer as a military chaplain. However, given Byrne's delicate health, Walsh declined his request. When Walsh went to Asia on a mission that same year, Bryne became acting superior general of the order. He supervised the Maryknoll Preparatory Seminary (the minor seminary) while it was located in Scranton, Pennsylvania, as well as the Maryknoll Seminary (the major seminary) near Ossining, New York. Bryne's biggest project was supervising the construction of the new buildings for the Ossining seminary.

The Scranton seminary had moved to Clarks Summit, Pennsylvania, to be known as the Venard Seminary. Byrne was asked to serve as its rector in 1918. While the seminary building was being constructed in Clarks Summit, everyone slept in an unheated farmhouse attic. That winter, during the Spanish Flu pandemic, the windows were kept open, exacerbating Byrne's asthma. He was relieved of his responsibilities as acting superior general in 1919.Attendees at Venard remembered Byrne as being kind and gracious to everyone.

=== Prefect apostolic of Pyongyang ===
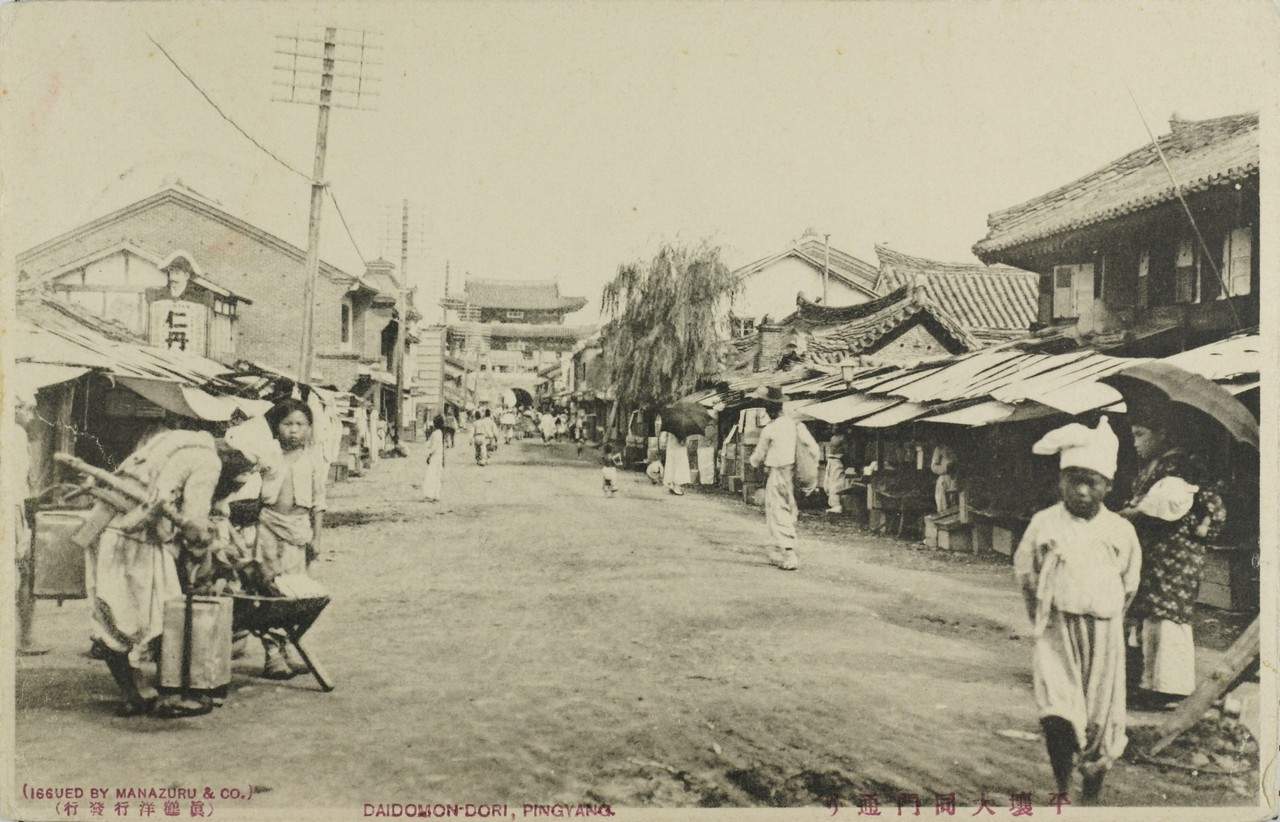
Pyongyang, Korea (1910)

In 1922, Bryne was name as the leader of the first Maryknoll mission to Korea. At that time, Korea was a territory of Japan. Leaving the United States in 1923, he traveled first to Rome, where he was granted an audience with Pope Pius XI. Byrne spent several days in Kobe, Japan, before finally sailing to Korea. Byrne finally arrived at the city of Sinuiju, located on the Yalu River across from Manchuria. Soon after his arrival, Byrne was stricken with dysentery and spent a short time at the Protestant-run hospital in Sinuiju. He then traveled to Shanghai in China to fully recuperate.

Returning to Sinuiju from China in late 1923, Byrne devoted much of his time to learning the Korean language. In early 1924, he escorted the first Maryknoll sisters from Japan to Sinuiju. By 1925, more Maryknoll priests had arrived in the city and missionary work in the area was proceeding. Byrne's next big project was the construction of a permanent church in Sinuiju. Always willing to assist in manual labor, Byrne helped the workers in its construction. He also helped build a convent outside the city. At one point, he purchased a retreat for his missionaries in the city of Wonsan on the Sea of Japan. (Note: In 1926, Maryknoll published Byrne's translation of a French study, Le Catholicisme en Corée, as The Catholic Church in Korea. He omitted the French text's "complaints about the superior resources available to Protestants".)

In 1927, Pius XI elevated Byrne to the rank of monsignor and named him the prefect apostolic of the city of Pyongyang in KoreaHe left Sinuiju to reside in Pyongyang. He built a second retreat house for the priests in the prefecture at Saiho, a village outside the city. He was always happy to entertain missionaries passing through Pyongyang, giving them encouragement for their work. When Auxiliary Bishop John Joseph Dunn of the Society for the Propagation of the Faith arrived in Pyongyang, Byrne went with him on a tour of Maryknoll missions in Korea, Manchuria and Japan. While serving as prefect, Byrne wrote numerous articles for The Field Afar, the Maryknoll newsletter.

=== Assistant superior general and rector ===
In 1929, Byrne left Korea to attend first General Chapter of Maryknoll in Rome. He traveled to Europe on the Trans-Siberian Railroad through the Soviet Union. At the meeting he was elected as one of four assistant superior generals of the Society. He was also namde as rector of the Maryknoll Seminary in Ossining. He resigned his position as prefect apostolic of Pyongyang.

=== Prefect apostolic of Kyoto ===
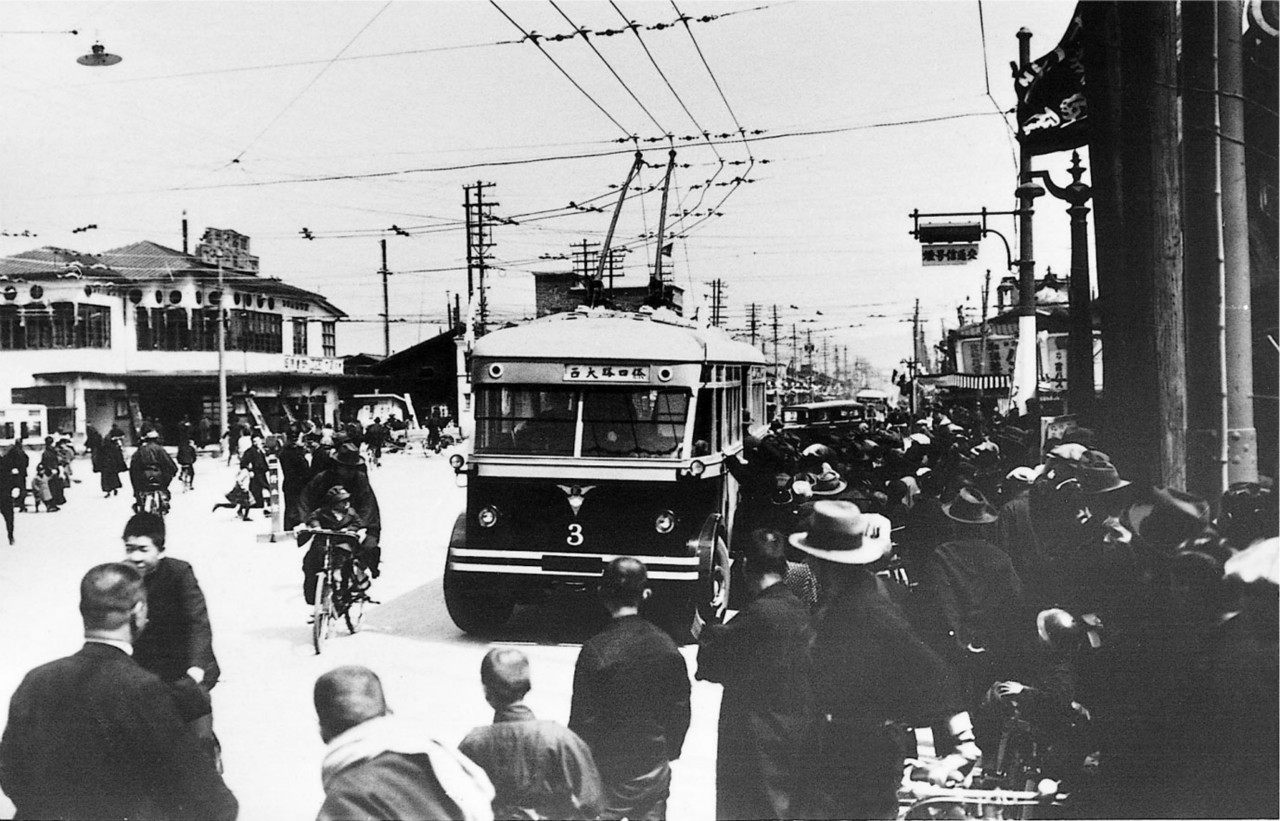
Kyoto, Japan (1935)

The Maryknoll Society in June 1934 received permission to establish its first mission in the city of Kyoto in Japan; Byrne was selected at age 46 to lead the initiative. At that point, he resigned as rector of the Maryknoll Seminary in Ossining. In the spring of 1935, Byrne sailed from San Francisco, California, stopping briefly in Honolulu, Hawaii. He arrived in Yokohama, Japan, then proceeded to Tokyo to rendezvous with other priests in the Society. The original plan was for the Maryknoll Society to take over the Diocese of Kyoto, but that was delayed by the Vatican due to increasing international tensions. Byrne and his missionaries spent the next two years in a rural area of the Shiga Prefecture.

Pius XI named Byrne the prefect apostolic of Kyoto on June 18, 1937.The next month, Japan invaded China, beginning years of warfare throughout East Asia. Of the one million inhabitants of Kyoto, only 1,200 were Christian. This was in contrast to the rapidly increasing numbers of Catholics in Korea.Byrne started a newsletter, the Bamboo Wireless, to deliver news about the church in Kyoto and to ask for donations. At one point, a group of Buddhist seminarians from the Chion-in Temple in Kyoto visited St. Francis Xavier, the only Catholic church in the city, for a mass. Byrne welcomed them warmly and they expressed their appreciation of the visit.

By early 1939, Nazi Germany and Italy were edging closer to war with Great Britain and France. As Japan was allied with Germany, the Vatican thought it prudent to start appointing Japanese priests as bishops. In October 1940, a year after World War II began in Europe, Byrne gladly resigned his position as prefect apostolic of Kyoto. In 1941, Byrne opened a tuberculosis sanitarium in the Kyoto area, funded and run by the Maryknoll Society.

=== World War II and house arrest ===
On December 7, 1941, Japan launched a surprise attack on Pearl Harbor in Hawaii and American installations in the Philippines. That same day, Japanese police started arresting and jailing the Maryknoll personnel throughout Japan. However, Byrne was only placed on house arrest. supposedly because local authorities appreciated his sanitarium project. After two months, he was moved to a Maryknoll rectory, where he stayed until the end of the war. He was not allowed any Japanese visitors and could not leave the property. He kept busy doing yard work in the garden and studying Japanese language. He suffered from malnutrition due to the meagre wartime rations.

After the nuclear bombings in Hiroshima and Nagasaki, along with the shock of the Japanese surrender, rumors swept the population over fears of massacres and reprisals by the soon-to-arrive American occupation forces. A group from an Osaka newspaper went to visit Byrne, asking him to deliver a radio broadcast to calm these fears. Fifteen hours later, Byrne arrived in Tokyo with a police escort, where he recorded a message. It was broadcast several times over the next few days. One part of it was.

I. as an American, speak to you Japanese in the names of those soldiers about to enter your land to assure you that you need have no fear. They are not coming into these shores as invaders, with tanks, bayonets and bullets, but merely as representatives of their country.

When word of Byrne's broadcast reached the United States, newspapers started referring to him as "Japan's number-two American." US General Douglas McArthur, the Supreme Commander for the Allied Powers in Japan, later praised Byrne for his assistance. In July 1946, a weakened Byrne returned to the United States for the first time in 11 years.

== Bishop ==
=== Apostolic Visitor to Korea ===
In the summer of 1947, Byrne returned to Japan. Concerned about the growing Communist influence there, he laid plans for more Maryknoll schools and missions to help provide a counterbalance. However, the Vatican had other plans for him.

In April 1949, Pope Pius XII appointed Byrne as apostolic visitor to Korea, making him a bishop. The Japanese surrender had take Korea from Japan and divided it into two nations; North Korea, a communist regime allied with the Soviet Union and China and South Korea, an authoritarian government allied with the United States.North Korea viewed Catholic bishops and priests on its territory as enemies of the state. After his appointment, Byrne took residence in Seoul, the capital of South Korea.

Byrne was consecrated a bishop on June 14, 1949 at the Myeongdong Cathedral in Seoul by Auxiliary Bishop Thomas McDonnell of the Archdiocese of New York. The co-consecrators were Bishops Paul Marie Kinam Ro, apostolic vicar of Seoul, and Andrien-Joseph Larribeau, apostolic vicar emeritus of Seoul. Byrne was very unhappy about leaving Japan, as he had grown very attached to the Japanese people, but he did not voice any objections to the Vatican.

Once in South Korea, Byrne made radio broadcasts condemning the lack of religious freedom in North Korea. In turn, the North Koreans threatened him with retaliation if he should end up in their custody. In August 1949, he addressed a ceremony marking the inauguration of the new South Korean government. Byrne was always willing to talk to anyone who came to see him, whether they be high government officials or street people. As bishop, Byrne still cleaned his own room and washed his clothes personally.

== Imprisonment ==
=== Capture and interrogation ===
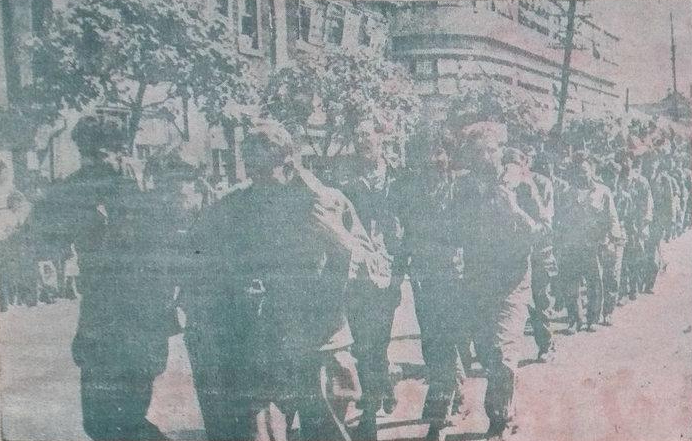
American prisoners of war, Pyongyang, 1950

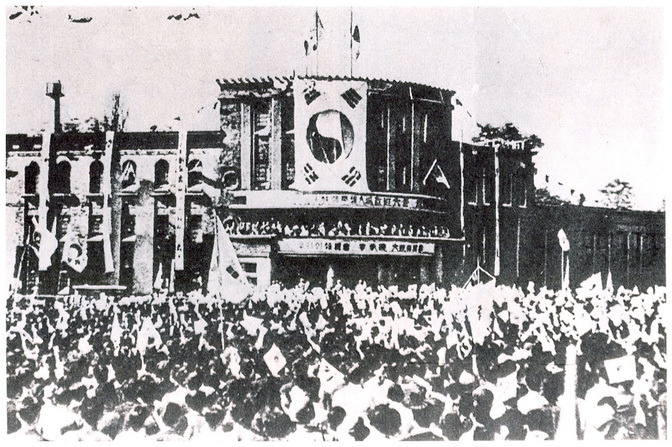
Pyongyang (1950)

Byrne was in Seoul when on June 25, 1950, the Korean People's Army (KPA) of North Korea invaded South Korea .The ill-prepared South Korean forces fled before them. Byrne was given the chance to evacuated Seoul with other Westerners, but he refused to leave. The next day, KPA troops and collaborators arrived the delegation house for Byrne and started looting it. By June 28th, the KPA was in control of Seoul. Byrne moved to the rectory of the cathedral, where he managed to hide indoors for two weeks. Byrne was arrested on July 11th.

Several days after his capture, Byrne and other captives were brought before a people's court. The judge told Byrne he would be executed if he did not broadcast a denunciation of the United States on the radio; Byrne refused. The next day, Byrne and the other civilian captives were transported by train to Pyongyang, the North Korean capital. Larry Zellers, a Methodist missionary in custody there, described how the KPA guards brought Byrne into the room and threw him on the floor. Zellers said he looked half-dead.Bryne was interrogated every day on every detail of his life. He developed sores due to his poor diet.

=== Transport to Manpo ===
On September 5th, Byrne and 58 other civilian captives were sent by train to Manpo, a city on the Yalu River border with China.The trip took almost a week, with the train travelling only at night. It was strafed one day by an American fighter plane. During the trip, Bryne recognized church and school buildings that he had constructed as a missionary in the 1930s. The train reached Manpo on September 11th. Approximately 750 American prisoners of war (POW)s joined the civilians in Manpo for a six-week quarantine.

=== Forced march ===
By mid-October, UN Forces under the command of MacArthur had routed the KPA and were pushing north towards the Yalu River. The North Koreans decided to move all the prisoners to a more remote prison camp away from the battle. On October 31, 1950, a KPA major nicknamed "Tiger" told all the prisoners that they would walk to a POW camp 110 miles (180 km) in the north. On the third day of the march, Byrne delivered a general absolution to a crowd of prisoners on a hillside. The weather grew colder as the prisoners passed through the Kangnam Mountains; most of the prisoners, including Byrne, were wearing light summer clothes. At one point, Bryne gave his blanket to a Methodist missionary who was in worse shape. Whenever the column stopped for a rest, Byrne would start praying. Soon others joined him. Zellers described Byrne during the march,

“Bishop Byrne was a holy man. He would walk among the group, and all eyes would be on him. He was so friendly, but also scholarly. The more you got to know him, the more you realized he was a person of deep feeling."

== Death ==
On November 8th, the prisoner column arrived at a POW camp near Hachangri.The ordeal had severely weakened Byrne. The prisoners were moved into poor housing that did little to keep them warm in temperatures reaching below zero degrees Fahrenheit. Food rations were small. The camp commandant force the prisoners to perform calisthenics every morning in the cold. Byrne soon came down with pneumonia and grew very weak. On November 24th, the day before he died, Byrne made this statement to his friends.

“After the privilege of my priesthood, I regard this privilege of having suffered for Christ with all of you as the greatest of my life.”

Byrne died in Hachangri on November 25, 1950, at age 62. The priest Thomas F. Quinlan buried Byrne in his own cassock.

== Veneration ==
Byrne's cause for sainthood was opened in 2013.In 2017, a special commission of South Korean bishops began studying whether Byrne and 80 other Catholics who died in North Korean custody could be considered martyrs.

== See also ==
- The Korean War
- Missionaries
- Emil Kapaun

== Additional sources ==
- Lane, Raymond A. (1955). Ambassador in Chains: The Life of Bishop Patrick James Byrne (1888-1950) Apostolic Delegate to the Republic of Korea. P.J. Kenedy.
- Crosbie, Philip (1955). March Till They Die. Browne & Nolan.
- Ryan, Eileen (July 1, 2017). "Marching to Martyrdom in Korea". Maryknoll Magazine.
