= Francis Hong Yong-ho =

Catholic Bishop of Pyongyang (1906–?)

Servant of God Francis Hong Yong-ho
- Bishop of Pyongyang
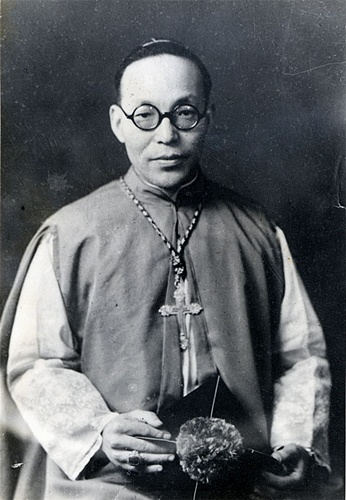
- Native name: 홍용호 프란치스코 (Korean)
- Church: Catholic Church
- Province: Seoul
- Diocese: Pyongyang
- In office: 1962–?
- Previous posts: Vicar Apostolic of Heijo; Vicar Apostolic of Pyongyang

Orders
- Ordination: 25 May 1933
- Consecration: 29 June 1944 by Bonifatius Sauer, O.S.B.

Personal details
- Born: 12 October 1906 Pyongyang, Korean Empire
- Died: Unknown; death was acknowledged in June 2013 by the Holy See
- Denomination: Catholicism
- Motto: Surgite eamus

Ordination history of Francis Hong Yong-ho
History
Episcopal consecration
- Principal consecrator: Bonifatius Sauer, O.S.B.
- Co-consecrators: Irenaeus Hayasaka, Paul Roh Ki-nam

Francis Hong Yong-ho (Korean: 홍용호 프란치스코; Hanja: 洪龍浩; born 12 October 1906; disappeared in 1949; declared dead in June 2013) was a Catholic prelate in North Korea who was imprisoned by the communist regime of Kim Il Sung in 1949 and later disappeared. After his disappearance, he was for many years listed as the Bishop of Pyongyang.

== Biography ==
Born in Pyongyang on 12 October 1906, Francis Hong Yong-ho was ordained to the priesthood on 25 May 1933. Eleven years later, he was appointed the Vicar Apostolic of Heijō and Titular Bishop of Auzia by Pope Pius XII on 24 March 1944. His episcopal ordination took place on 29 June 1944, the principal consecrator being Bishop Bonifatius Sauer, O.S.B., with Bishops Irenaeus Hayasaka and Paul Roh Ki-nam as co-consecrators.

He was imprisoned by the communist regime of Kim Il Sung in 1949 and later disappeared. According to Cardinal Nicolas Cheong Jin-suk, speaking in 2006:

There’s no knowledge of priests surviving persecution that came in the late 1940s, when 166 priests and religious were killed or kidnapped. The Pontifical Yearbook continues to describe as "missing" the man who was the bishop of Pyong-yang at the time, Monsignor Francis Hong Yong-ho, who today would be a hundred years old. It's a gesture by the Holy See to point to the tragedy that the Church in Korea has suffered and is still going through.

The Vicariate Apostolic of Heijō changed its name to Pyongyang on 12 July 1950, which was elevated to the status of the Diocese of Pyongyang by Pope John XXIII on 10 March 1962, with Francis Hong Yong-ho named as the first bishop of the new diocese.

== Disappearance ==
After being listed as the ordinary of Pyongyang by the Pontifical Yearbook for decades, with the specification that he was to be considered "missing", Hong Yong-ho's death was finally acknowledged by the Holy See in June 2013, although the actual date and place of death is unknown. This decision is connected to the fact that the Catholic Bishops' Conference of Korea have asked the Congregation for the Causes of Saints for the nihil obstat to open the cause of beatification of Bishop Hong.

== See also ==
- List of people who disappeared mysteriously: 1910-1990

Catholic Church titles
Preceded by William F. O'Shea	Vicar Apostolic of Heijo; 1944–1950	Title renamed
New title	Vicar Apostolic of Pyongyang; 1950–1962	Title elevated
New title	Bishop of Pyongyang; 1962–2013	Sede vacante
