= The Pope and Mussolini =

2014 book by David Kertzer

The Pope and Mussolini: The Secret History of Pius XI and the Rise of Fascism in Europe
- Author: David Kertzer
- Published: January 28, 2014
- Publisher: Random House Publishing Group
- Awards: Pulitzer Prize for Biography or Autobiography

The Pope and Mussolini: The Secret History of Pius XI and the Rise of Fascism in Europe is a 2014 biography of Pope Pius XI about his relations with Benito Mussolini and rise of Fascism in Europe by David Kertzer. The book examined documentary evidence from the Vatican archives, arguing that Pope Pius XI played a significant role in supporting the rise of fascism and Benito Mussolini in Italy.

The Pope and Mussolini won the 2015 Pulitzer Prize for Biography or Autobiography.

== About the book ==
This is the story of Pope Pius XI’s relations with Italian dictator Benito Mussolini, based on archival material from both.

== Reception ==
The book was lauded by many authors including Joseph J. Ellis, who wrote, "Kertzer has an eye for a story, an ear for the right word, and an instinct for human tragedy. This is a sophisticated blockbuster." The New Yorker called the book "A fascinating and tragic story." The New York Review of Books states, "Revelatory . . . [a] detailed portrait." Historian Paul Gottfried criticized the book for being overly critical of the Church.

== Editions ==
- Kertzer, David I. (2014). The Pope and Mussolini: The Secret History of Pius XI and the Rise of Fascism in Europe (American ed.). Random House Publishing Group. ISBN 9780679645535.
- Kertzer, David I. (2014). The Pope and Mussolini: The Secret History of Pius XI and the Rise of Fascism in Europe (British ed.). Oxford University Press. ISBN 9780198716167.
- Kertzer, David I. (2014). Il patto col diavolo: Mussolini e Papa Pio XI le relazioni segrete fra il Vaticano e l'Italia fascista (in Italian). Rizzoli. ISBN 9788858664674.
- Kertzer, David I. (2016). Der erste Stellvertreter: Papst Pius XI. und der geheime Pakt mit dem Faschismus (in German). Theiss Verlag. ISBN 9783806233827.

== Awards ==
The biography won the 2015 Pulitzer Prize in Drama, Letter and Music category of Biography or Autobiography.

- Pulitzer Prize for Biography or Autobiography
