= Giovanni Bonzano =

Catholic cardinal

His Eminence Giovanni Bonzano P.I.M.E.
- Cardinal-Priest of Santa Susanna
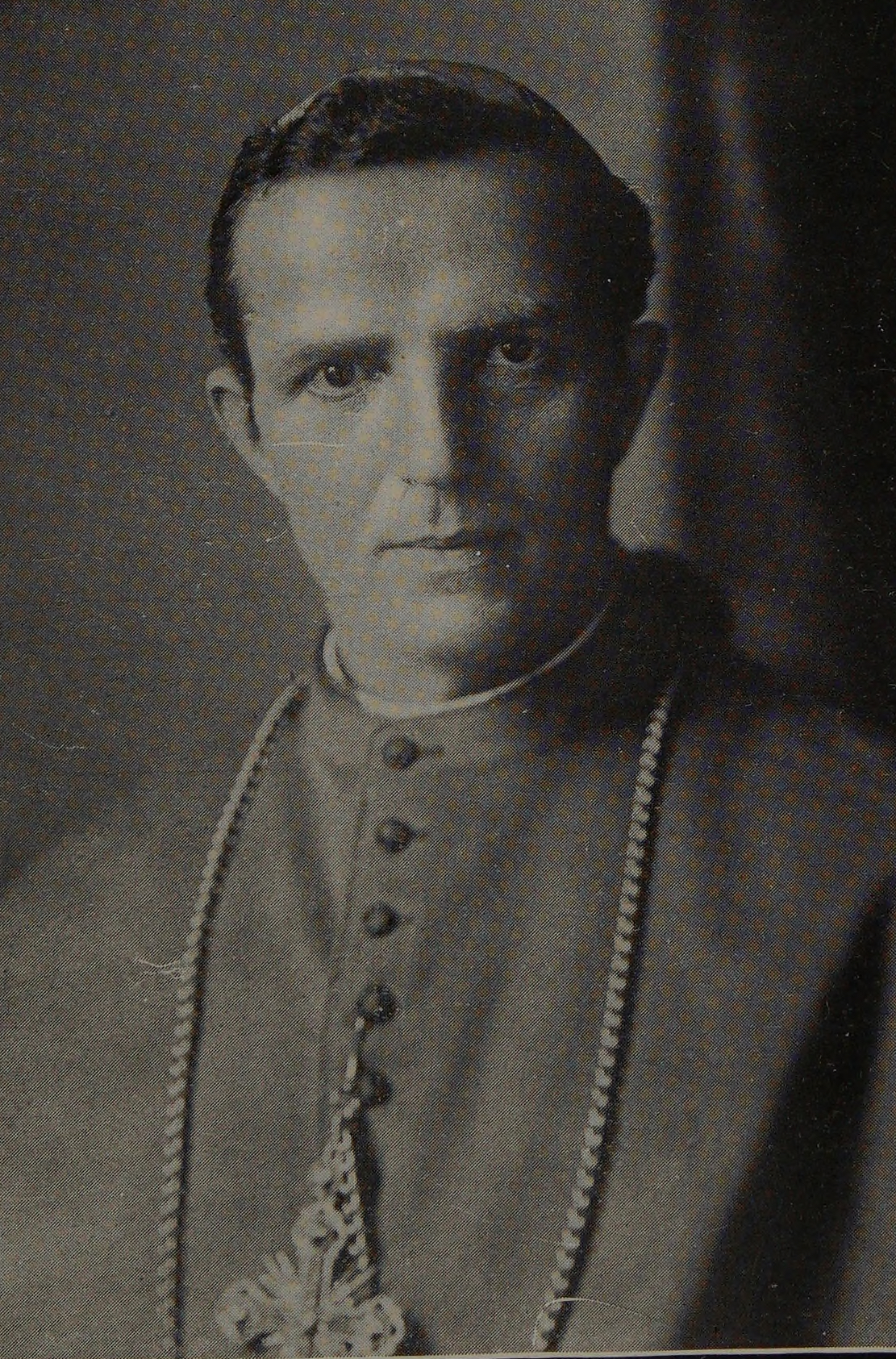
- Church: Roman Catholic Church
- Appointed: 18 December 1924
- Term ended: 26 November 1927
- Predecessor: Giorgio Gusmini
- Successor: Alexis-Henri-Marie Lépicier
- Previous posts: Titular Archbishop of Melitene (1912–22); Apostolic Delegate to the United States of America (1912–22); Cardinal-Priest of San Pancrazio (1922–24)

Orders
- Ordination: 21 May 1890 by Lucido Maria Parocchi
- Consecration: 3 March 1912 by Rafael Merry del Val y Zulueta
- Created cardinal: 11 December 1922 by Pope Pius XI
- Rank: Cardinal-Priest

Personal details
- Born: Giovanni Vincenzo Bonzano; 27 September 1867 Castelleto Scazzoso, Alessandria, Kingdom of Sardinia
- Died: 26 November 1927 (aged 60) Clinica Quisisana, Rome, Kingdom of Italy
- Parents: Giuseppe Bonzano; Agostina Vescovo

Styles of Giovanni Bonzano
- Reference style: His Eminence
- Spoken style: Your Eminence
- Informal style: Cardinal
- See: none

Giovanni Vincenzo Cardinal Bonzano PIME (27 September 1867 – 26 November 1927) was an Italian Cardinal of the Roman Catholic Church who served as Apostolic Delegate to United States from 1912 to 1922, and was elevated to the cardinalate in 1922.

== Biography ==
Giovanni Bonzano was born in Castelletto Monferrato to farm labourers Giuseppe and Agostina (née Vescovo) Bonzano. He was one of six children and the only one to go into the church. He attended the seminary in Vigevano before going to Rome to study at the Mastai College for Chinese Missions and Pontifical Urbanian Athenaeum De Propaganda Fide. He was ordained a priest of the Pontifical Institute for Foreign Missions by Cardinal Lucido Parocchi on 21 May 1890, and then did missionary work in China until 1897. Upon returning to Italy, Bonzano was made vicar general (26 August 1899) and chancellor (10 February 1900) of Vigevano. He then taught at the Pontifical Urbanian Athenaeum De Propaganda Fide from 1901 to 1904, becoming its rector on 16 May.

On 2 February 1912, Bonzano was appointed Apostolic Delegate to United States and Titular Archbishop of Melitene by Pope Pius X. He received his episcopal consecration on the following 3 March from Cardinal Rafael Merry del Val, with Bishops Pietro Barruti and Thomas Kennedy serving as co-consecrators, in Rome. Bonzano, in addition to his duties in Washington, D.C., was temporarily placed in charge of the Apostolic Delegation to Mexico on 22 June 1915.

During his time as Apostolic Delegate to United States, Archbishop Bonzano sent $210,400.09 to the Holy See to ensure the 1922 papal conclave could occur.

Pope Pius XI created him Cardinal-Priest of San Pancrazio in the consistory of 11 December 1922, whereupon he ceased to serve as Apostolic Delegate. Cardinal Bonzano opted to assume the titular church of Santa Susanna on 18 December 1924, and later presided over the initial renovation of the Basilica of Santa Maria degli Angeli in Assisi on 19 April 1925. He also served as papal legate to the 28th International Eucharistic Congress in Chicago on 20–24 June 1926. He arrived at the Congress aboard the "Cardinal's Train", a special New York Central/Pullman train painted cardinal red and gold to carry Bonzano and several other cardinals from the port in New York to Chicago.

Cardinal Bonzano died in Rome, at age 60; he is buried in the church of the Franciscan Missionaries of Mary in Grottaferrata.

Catholic Church titles
Preceded by Diomede Falconio, OFM	Apostolic Delegate to United States; 1912–1922	Succeeded by Pietro Fumasoni Biondi
