= Vito Carnevali =

Italian composer

Vito Carnevali (4 July 1888, in Rome – c. 1960, in Rome) was a composer of classical music.

Carnevali studied at the Accademía di Santa Cecilia (possibly between 1913 and 1918) under Giovanni Sgambatti (piano) and, with Leo Sowerby and Fernando Germani, under Ottorino Respighi (composition). Carnevali worked for a time in the United States, in Chicago (conservatory or music college), New York City (Harvard-piano), and at St Patrick's Cathedral in New York City (where he probably succeeded Pietro Yon as organist). He spent some time in Algiers before returning to Rome.

Some of his compositions include the four-part Mass settings Missa "Rosa Mystica", Missa "Stella Matutina", Missa "Ave Verum", Missa "Auxilium Christianorum", Missa "Jesu Salvator Mundi", and Missa "Mater Amabilis".
