= David I. Kertzer =

American anthropologist (born 1948)

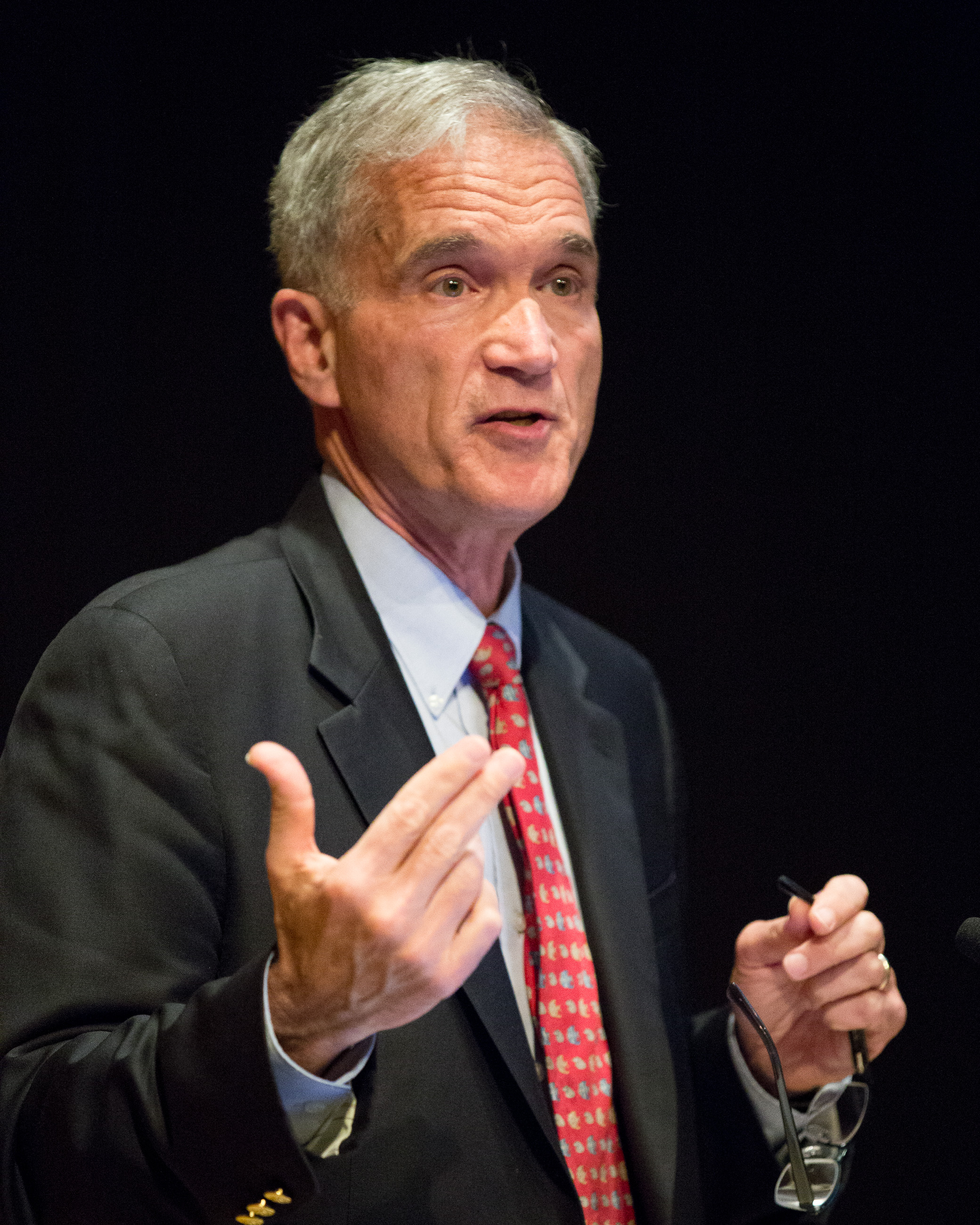
- Kertzer in 2015
- Born: February 20, 1948 (age 78); New York City, U.S.
- Education: Brown University; Brandeis University
- Occupations: Professor; historian; author
- Employer: Brown University
- Notable work: The Kidnapping of Edgardo Mortara (1997); The Popes Against the Jews (2001); The Pope and Mussolini (2014); The Pope at War (2022)
- Awards: Pulitzer Prize for Biography or Autobiography (2015)
- Website: www.davidkertzer.com

David Israel Kertzer (born February 20, 1948) is an American anthropologist, historian, and academic, specializing in the political, demographic, and religious history of Italy. He is the Paul Dupee Jr. University Professor of Social Science, Professor of Anthropology, and Professor of Italian Studies at Brown University. His book The Pope and Mussolini: The Secret History of Pius XI and the Rise of Fascism in Europe (2014) won the 2015 Pulitzer Prize for Biography or Autobiography. From July 1, 2006, to June 30, 2011, Kertzer served as Provost at Brown.

== Biography ==
David Kertzer graduated from Brown University in 1969. He received his PhD in anthropology from Brandeis University in 1974 and taught at Bowdoin College until 1992. That year he joined the faculty of Brown University as Professor of Anthropology and History.

Sponsored by the U.S.-Italy Fulbright Commission, in 1978 he was Senior Lecturer at the University of Catania and in 2000, chair at the University of Bologna. In 2001, he relinquished his post at Brown as Professor of History and was appointed Professor of Italian Studies. In 2005, he was elected a member of the American Academy of Arts and Sciences. From July 1, 2006, to June 30, 2011, Kertzer served as Provost at Brown.

== Scholarship ==
Kertzer is the author of numerous books and articles on politics and culture, European social history, anthropological demography, 19th-century Italian social history, contemporary Italian society and politics, and the history of Vatican relations with the Jews and the Italian state. His book, The Kidnapping of Edgardo Mortara, was a finalist for the National Book Award in Nonfiction in 1997.

His The Popes Against the Jews, published in 2001, was subsequently described as "one of the most critically acclaimed and contentious books of its genre and generation." The book analyzes the relation between the development of the Catholic Church and the growth of European anti-Semitism in the 19th and 20th centuries, arguing that the Vatican and several popes contributed actively to fertilizing the ideological ground that produced the Holocaust. The work produced intense discussion among scholars of European history and historians of the Catholic Church. Royal Historical Society Fellow Michael Burleigh objected to “the jumbled chronology, the doctored texts, and the rigged translations that constitute the shoddy underpinnings of the work of Kertzer and of his supportive admirers who are endeavoring to replace an authentic historical narrative with an ideologically driven polemic."

The follow-up work, The Pope and Mussolini: The Secret History of Pius XI and the Rise of Fascism in Europe (2014), examined documentary evidence from the Vatican Secret Archives, arguing that Pope Pius XI played a significant role in supporting the rise of fascism and Benito Mussolini in Italy but not of Nazi Germany. The book won the Pulitzer Prize for Biography or Autobiography in April 2015.

In 2020, after decades of pressure, the Vatican archives were finally opened, and Kertzer was among the first historians to access them. At the time of the death of Pius XII, in 1958, all the documents of the pontificate were locked up: by preventing scholars from consulting them, many questions remained unanswered, making Eugenio Pacelli one of the most controversial popes in history. With the support of thousands of unpublished documents, in his 2022 book The Pope at War: the Secret History of Pius XII, Hitler, and Mussolini , Kertzer uncovered the existence of secret negotiations between Hitler and Pius XII already a few weeks after the end of the conclave. He also showed to what extent Mussolini relied on the Italian clergy and religious institutions to obtain popular support for entering the war, and how both Mussolini and Hitler managed to manipulate the Pontiff to their own advantage. Above all, Kertzer explains why, despite having irrefutable evidence of the ongoing extermination of the Jews, Pius XII never denounced the Nazi atrocities, as he preferred to abandon the role of moral guide, rather than put at risk continued existence of the Church.

== Honors and awards ==
- 1969: Phi Beta Kappa, magna cum laude, Brown University
- 1972–1973: Woodrow Wilson Dissertation Fellow
- 1978: Fulbright Senior Lecturer, University of Catania, Italy, winter–spring
- 1982–1983: Fellowship, Center for Advanced Study in the Behavioral Sciences, Stanford
- 1986–1987: Guggenheim Fellowship
- 1995–1996: National Endowment for the Humanities Fellowship
- Fall 1999: American Academy in Rome, Department of Education Professor
- May–June 2000: Fellowship, Rockefeller Foundation Study Center, Bellagio, Italy
- Spring 2000: Fulbright Chair, University of Bologna
- 2005: Elected Fellow, American Academy of Arts and Sciences
- 2015: Pulitzer Prize for Biography or Autobiography
- 2015–2016: Rome Prize for Modern Italian Studies

=== Book Awards ===
- 1985: Marraro Prize (Society for Italian Historical Studies) for the best work on Italian history category in 1984 for Family Life in Central Italy.
- 1991: Marraro Prize (Society for Italian Historical Studies) for the best work on Italian history category in 1989 for Family, Political Economy, and Demographic Change.
- 1997: National Jewish Book Award in the Jewish-Christian Relations category for The Kidnapping of Edgardo Mortara

=== Finalists ===
- 1997: National Book Award for Nonfiction for The Kidnapping of Edgardo Mortara.
- 2002: Mark Lynton Prize for History for The Popes Against the Jews.

== Written works ==
- Comrades and Christians: Religion and Political Struggle in Communist Italy. New York: Cambridge University Press, 1980
- Family Life in Central Italy, 1880–1910: Sharecropping, Wage Labor and Coresidence. New Brunswick: Rutgers University Press, 1984.
- Ritual, Politics and Power. New Haven: Yale University Press, 1988.
- Family, Political Economy, and Demographic Change: The Transformation of Life in Casalecchio, Italy, 1861–1921 (with Dennis Hogan). Madison: University of Wisconsin Press, 1989.
- Sacrificed for Honor: Italian Infant Abandonment and the Politics of Reproductive Control. Boston: Beacon Press, 1993
- Politics and Symbols: The Italian Communist Party and the Fall of Communism. New Haven: Yale University Press, 1996.
- The Kidnapping of Edgardo Mortara. New York: Knopf, 1997.
- The Popes Against the Jews: The Vatican's Role in the Rise of Modern Anti-Semitism. New York: Knopf, 2001.
- Prisoner of the Vatican: The Pope's Plot to Capture Italy from the New Italian State. Boston: Houghton-Mifflin, 2004.
- Amalia's Tale: a Peasant's Fight for Justice in 19th Century Italy. Boston: Houghton-Mifflin, 2008.
- The Pope and Mussolini: The Secret History of Pius XI and the Rise of Fascism in Europe. Random House Publishing, 2014.
- The Pope Who Would Be King: The Exile of Pius IX and the Emergence of Modern Europe. Random House, April 24, 2018.
- The Pope at War: the secret history of Pius XII, Mussolini, and Hitler, New York: ISBN 978-0-8129-8994-6, 2022
