= Boniface Sauer =

Roman Catholic bishop

Abbot Boniface Sauer O.S.B. D.D.
- Abbot of Tokwon
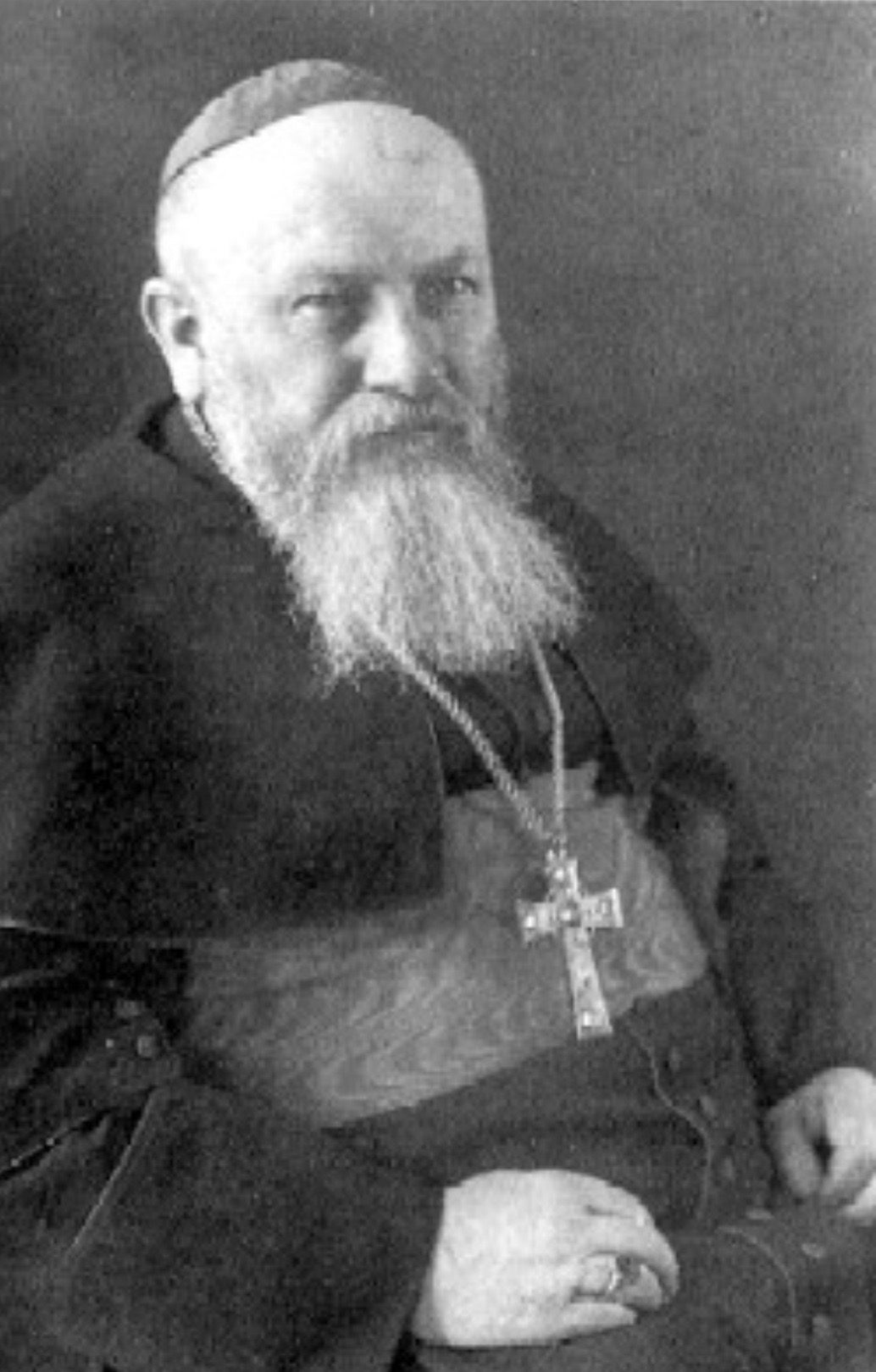
- Bonifatius Sauer
- Native name: Bonifatius Sauer
- Church: Catholic Church
- See: Territorial Abbey of Tokwon
- In office: 12 January 1940 – 7 February 1950
- Predecessor: Abbey erected
- Successor: Timotheus Bitterli
- Other posts: Apostolic Administrator of Hamheung (1920-1940); Titular Bishop of Appiaria (1920-1950)
- Previous post: Apostolic Administrator of Ilan (1928-1934)

Orders
- Ordination: 26 July 1903
- Consecration: 1 May 1921 by Gustave Mutel

Personal details
- Born: Joseph Sauer; 10 January 1877 Oberufhausen (in present-day Eiterfeld), Province of Hesse-Nassau, Kingdom of Prussia, German Empire
- Died: 7 February 1950 (aged 73) Prison, Pyongyang, North Korea

Abbot Boniface Sauer, O.S.B. (10 January 1877 – 7 February 1950) was a Benedictine monk and Catholic bishop who served as apostolic administrator of Hamheung, Korea and Abbot of Tokugen o Tokwon.

== Biography ==
Boniface Sauer was born Oberuffhausen, Germany. On 4 February 1900, he made Solemn Profession in the Order of Saint Benedict and was ordained a priest on 26 July 1903. On 25 August 1920, Sauer was appointed vicar apostolic of Wonsan, Korea and Titular Bishop of Appiaria. He was ordained a bishop on 1 May 1921 by Bishop Gustave-Charles-Marie Mutel, M.E.P.

On 9 July 1928, Sauer was appointed the apostolic administrator of Ilan, China. Six years later, on 15 February 1934, he resigned as apostolic administrator of Ilan, China.

On 12 January 1940, Sauer was appointed the abbot of Tokugen o Tokwon, Korea and apostolic administrator of Hamheung, Korea.

He died in a North Korean prison in 1950. His beatification process is underway. He is included in the Martyrologium Germanicum.

== See also ==
- Religion in Korea
- Religion in North Korea
- Christianity in Korea
- Catholic Church in South Korea
- List of Catholic Dioceses in Korea
- List of Saints from Asia
