= Chicago Catholic =

Newspaper of the Archdiocese of Chicago

- Type: Bi-weekly newspaper
- Format: Broadsheet
- Owner: Archbishop of Chicago
- Editor: Joyce Duriga
- Headquarters: 3525 S. Lake Park Ave., Chicago, IL 60653
- Website: www.chicagocatholic.com

Chicago Catholic is the official newspaper of the Archdiocese of Chicago. The publication was known as Chicago New World prior to a name change in January 2017.

It provides news, analysis and commentary about the church at the world, national, and local levels and about issues of concern to the Catholic community.

== Contributors ==
- Cardinal Francis George
- Bishop Robert Barron
