= Diocese of Pyongyang =

Latin Catholic diocese in North Korea

Diocese of Pyongyang Dioecesis Pyeongyangensis 평양 교구

Location
- Country: North Korea
- Ecclesiastical province: Seoul

Statistics
- Population: Total: Unknown

Information
- Denomination: Catholic
- Sui iuris church: Latin Church
- Rite: Roman Rite
- Established: March 17, 1927 (prefecture apostolic); July 11, 1939 (vicariate apostolic); March 10, 1962 (diocese)

Current leadership
- Pope: Leo XIV
- Bishop: Sede vacante
- Apostolic Administrator: Peter Chung Soon-taick

Map

Website
- py.catholic.or.kr

The Diocese of Pyongyang is a diocese of the Roman Catholic Church in North Korea. Its only official bishop, Francis Hong Yong-ho, was imprisoned by the government of the North Korea led by Kim Il-sung in 1949 and later disappeared. The Archbishop of Seoul acts as the Apostolic Administrator for Pyongyang.

== History ==
In 1927, the Pyongyang apostolic prefecture was carved out from the then Diocese of Seoul. The prefecture was entrusted to Maryknoll priests who had worked there since 1923. Monsignor Patrick James Byrne, former apostolic delegate to Seoul from 1947 to 1950, became its first apostolic prefect. The prefecture was elevated to apostolic vicariate in 1939 and Bishop William O'Shea became the first apostolic vicar, however, Bishop O'Shea was repatriated by Japanese colonialists after the Pacific War broke out in 1941. Archbishop Paul Ro Ki-nam of Seoul, the first Korean bishop in the country, then managed the vicariate as its apostolic administrator until Bishop Francis Hong Yong-ho, the second Korean prelate, became its apostolic vicar in 1943. The population of Pyongyang diocese as of 1943 was 3,650,623, all ethnic Koreans.

Bishop Hong was arrested by communists in the North and went missing in 1949. Since the Korean War, the North has not had a resident priest.

The vicariate was elevated to a diocese in 1962 when the Korean Church hierarchy was formally established.

In 1985, the late Bishop Daniel Tji Hak-soon of Wonju visited Pyongyang to meet his younger sister: this was the first time a prelate in the South had visited the communist country since the Korean War. In 1998, then Auxiliary Bishop Andrew Choi Chang-mou of Seoul, now archbishop of Kwangju, visited Pyongyang as a delegate of Cardinal Stephen Kim Sou-hwan, then apostolic administrator of Pyongyang. This was the first pastoral visit to North Korea by a Korean bishop since the Korean War. Bishop Choi, president of the Korean Bishops' National Reconciliation Committee, celebrated a Mass in the North's only Catholic church, Changchung Church.

In June 2002, Bishop Paul Choi Deog-ki of Suwon visited Pyongyang and delivered 2,002 soccer balls. From September 8-10, 2005, Bishop Lazarus You Heung-sik of Daejeon, president of the committee for Caritas Coreana of the Catholic Bishops' Conference of Korea (CBCK), visited the capital of North Korea to attend the completion ceremony of a cultivation facility for seed potatoes donated by Caritas Coreana.

The (North) Korean Roman Catholics' Association was set up on June 30, 1988. Samuel Chang Jae-on has been its president since its establishment. The association published a catechism and a prayer book in 1991.

== Ordinaries ==
=== Prefect Apostolic of Hpyeng-yang (Peng-yang) ===
- Patrick James Byrne (1927–1929)
- John Edward Morris (1930–1936)
- William R. Booth (1936–1939; apostolic administrator)

=== Vicars Apostolic of Heijō (Pyongyang) ===
- William O'Shea (1939–1942)
- Paul Roh Ki-nam (1942–1943; apostolic administrator)
- Francis Hong Yong-ho (1943–1950, imprisoned 1949; later disappeared, death acknowledged in June 2013)
- George Carroll (1950–1962; apostolic administrator)

=== Bishops of Pyongyang ===
- George Carroll (1962–1975; apostolic administrator)
- Cardinal Stephen Kim Sou-hwan (1975–1998; apostolic administrator)
- Cardinal Nicolas Cheong Jin-Suk (1998–2012; apostolic administrator)
- Cardinal Andrew Yeom Soo-jung (2012–2021; apostolic administrator)
- Peter Chung Soon-taick (2021–present; apostolic administrator)
