= Catholic Bishops' Conference of Korea =

Catholic episcopal conference of Korea

- 한국천주교주교회의
- Abbreviation: CBCK
- Formation: March 1857
- Type: Episcopal conference
- Headquarters: Seoul, South Korea
- Members: Catholic bishops of Korea
- President: Matthias Ri Iong-hoon
- Vice-President: Basil Cho Kyu-man
- Parent organization: Catholic Church
- Website: www.cbck.or.kr

The Catholic Bishops' Conference of Korea is the Catholic episcopal conference of Korea.

The Bishops' Committee for National Reconciliation works towards reconciliation and peace for the Korean people and supports North Korean refugees in South Korea.

== List of presidents ==
- Thomas F. Quinlan, S.S.C.M.E., Bishop of Chunchon (1959–1964)
- Paul Roh Ki-nam, Archbishop of Seoul (1964–1967)
- Victorinus Youn Kong-hi, Bishop of Suwon (1967–1970)
- Cardinal Stephen Kim Sou-hwan, Archbishop of Seoul (1970–1975)
- Victorinus Youn Kong-hi, Archbishop of Gwangju (1975–1981)
- Cardinal Stephen Kim Sou-hwan, Archbishop of Seoul (1981–1987)
- Angelo Kim Nam-su, Bishop of Suwon (1987–1993)
- Paul Ri Moun-hi, Archbishop of Daegu (1993–1996)
- Nicholas Cheong Jin-suk, Archbishop of Seoul (1996–1999)
- Michael Pak Jeong-il, Bishop of Masan (1999–2002)
- Andreas Choi Chang-mou, Archbishop of Gwangju (2002–2005)
- Augustine Cheong Myong-jo, Bishop of Busan (2005–2006)
- John Chang Yik, Bishop of Chunchon (2006–2008)
- Peter Kang Woo-il, Bishop of Cheju (2008–2014)
- Hyginus Kim Hee-jong, Archbishop of Gwangju (2014–2020)
- Matthias Lee Yong-hoon, Bishop of Suwon (2020–present)

== See also ==
- Catholic Church in Korea
- Catholic Church in South Korea
- Korean Catholic Bible
