= Andrew Yeom Soo-jung =

Archbishop of Seoul from 2012 to 2021

His Eminence Andrew Yeom Soo-jung 염수정 안드레아 추기경 廉洙政 안드레아 樞機卿
- Cardinal, Archbishop emeritus of Seoul
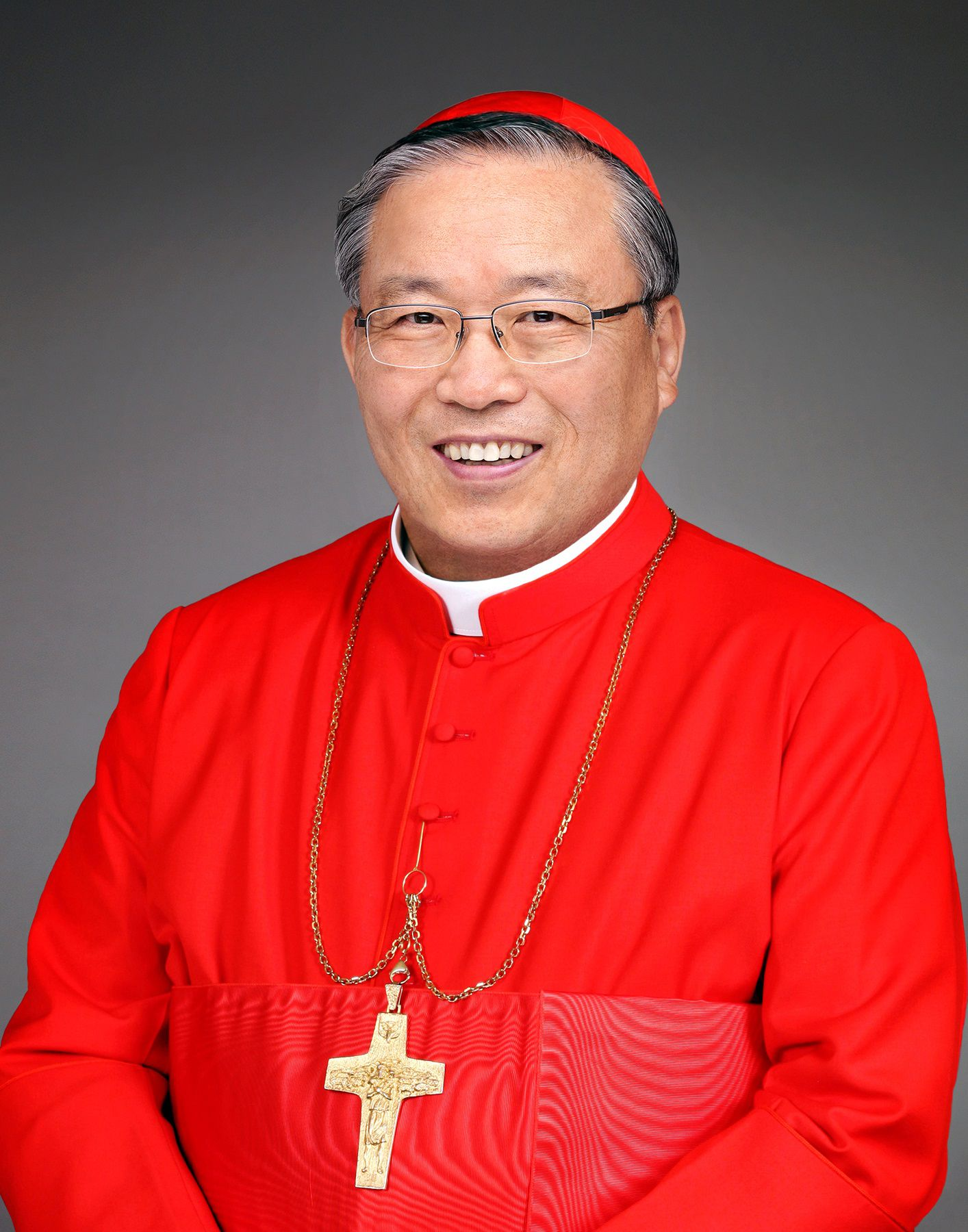
- Native name: 염수정
- Archdiocese: Seoul
- See: Seoul
- Appointed: 10 May 2012
- Installed: 25 June 2012
- Term ended: 28 October 2021
- Predecessor: Nicholas Cheong Jin-suk
- Successor: Peter Chung Soon-taick
- Other post: Cardinal-Priest of San Crisogono
- Previous posts: Auxiliary Bishop of Seoul (2001–2012); Titular Bishop of Thibiuca (2001–2012); Vicar General of the Archdiocese of Seoul (2002–2012)

Orders
- Ordination: 8 December 1970 by Stephen Kim Sou-hwan
- Consecration: 1 December 2001 by Nicholas Cheong Jin-suk
- Created cardinal: 22 February 2014 by Pope Francis
- Rank: Cardinal-Priest

Personal details
- Born: 염수정; Yeom Soo-Jung; 5 December 1943 (age 82) Anjō, Anjō County, Keiki Province, Korea under Japanese rule (now Anseong, South Korea)
- Denomination: Roman Catholic
- Residence: Seoul
- Parents: Yeom Han-jin; Baek Geum-wol
- Education: Catholic University of Korea
- Motto: Amen. Veni, Domine Jesu! (Amen. Come, Lord Jesus!)
- Coat of arms: Andrew Yeom Soo-jung 염수정 안드레아 추기경 廉洙政 안드레아 樞機卿's coat of arms

Styles of Andrew Yeom Soo Jung
- Reference style: His Eminence
- Spoken style: Your Eminence
- Religious style: Cardinal
- Informal style: Cardinal

- Andrew Yeom Soo-jung
- Hangul: 염수정
- Hanja: 廉洙政
- RR: Yeom Sujeong
- MR: Yŏm Sujŏng

Ordination history of Andrew Yeom Soo-jung
History
Episcopal consecration
- Principal consecrator: Nicholas Cheong Jin-suk
- Co-consecrators: Andreas Choi Chang-mou; John of the Cross Chang-yik
Cardinalate
- Elevated by: Pope Francis
Episcopal succession
Bishops consecrated by Andrew Yeom Soo-jung as principal consecrator
- Timothy You Gyoung-chon: 5 February 2014
- Peter Chung Soon-taick: 5 February 2014
- Benedictus Son Hee-song: 28 August 2014

Andrew Yeom Soo-jung (Korean: 염수정; Hanja: 廉洙政; born 5 December 1943) is a Korean prelate of the Catholic Church who was the Archbishop of Seoul from 2012 to 2021, while also holding the title of Apostolic Administrator of the Diocese of Pyongyang in North Korea. Pope Francis made him a cardinal in 2014. He was also the chairman of Catholic Peace Broadcasting Corporation (CPBC).

== Early life ==
Yeom Soo-jung was born in Ansong, Gyeonggi Province, to devout Catholic parents, Yeom Han-jin (Calixto) and Baek Geum-wol (Susanna) descendants of Joseph Yeom Deok-sun, who was among the first Koreans to convert to Christianity in the 1700s and Peter Yeom Seok-tae who was arrested and executed in 1850 for his Catholic faith. His ancestors were among the lay people who brought Christianity to the Korean peninsula in the 19th century, and his great-great-grandfather and his wife were executed as part of the Joseon dynasty's persecution of Christians. The Yeom family has kept their religious belief for generations through persecution, leading Archbishop Yeom, the fifth generation Catholic, to enter the priesthood. The third of six children, Yeom loves explaining how he discovered and cultivated his priestly vocation thanks to family prayer: his grandmother Magdalena Park and his mother, went to Mass every day for 30 years to pray for their children to become priests. His two brothers Yeom Soo-wan and Yeom Soo-eui have also followed him, currently leading two dioceses in Seoul.

At the age of 15, Yeom decided to become a priest and entered the seminary. He graduated from the Catholic University of Korea in 1970.

== Priest ==
He was ordained a priest of the Archdiocese of Seoul by Cardinal Kim Sou-hwan on 8 December 1970. He then obtained a Master of Education in Counseling Psychology from Korea University. He has also studied at the East Asian Pastoral Institute in the Philippines, while serving in various parishes.

After ordination he served as a curate from 1971 to 1973, then as President of the Minor Seminary, Songshin High School, from 1973 to 1977, and then as a pastor from 1977 until 1978. From 1987 until 1992, he was rector of the major seminary and then chancellor of the diocesan curia serving in that role until 1998.

In 1998 he was appointed one of the Seoul's Vicar Foranes, serving as a pastor as well until 2001. He was also a member of the Presbyteral Council.

== Bishop ==
On 12 December 2001, Pope John Paul II appointed him an Auxiliary Bishop of Seoul and titular bishop of Thibiuca. He was consecrated on 25 January 2002 in the Changcheon-dong Stadium, Seoul, by Nicholas Cheong Jin-suk, Archbishop of Seoul, assisted by Andrew Choi Chang-mou, Archbishop of Gwangju, and John Chang-yik, Bishop of Chunchon. He then became the Vicar General of the Archdiocese of Seoul and episcopal vicar for the pastoral and the apostolate of the mass media, member of the Permanent Council and of the Commission for Missions, and for the Commission for the Pastoral of Health of the Korean Episcopal Conference, as well as president of the Committee for the Apostolate of the Laity.

== Archbishop of Seoul ==
On 10 May 2012, Pope Benedict XVI appointed him Metropolitan Archbishop of Seoul to succeed Cardinal Nicholas Cheong Jin-suk. At the installation ceremony he said "We need to keep the dignity of human life in a society that takes life lightly. The Church will fight for that". As a symbolic gesture, the ceremony was held on the 62nd anniversary of the outbreak of the Korean War, praying especially for the reconciliation and reunification of the two Koreas. His ministry has also been marked by constant references to the precious faith of martyrs which is seen an example of authentic testimony all Christians should follow no matter what their life condition or state. He also expressed a strong eagerness for dialogue, reconciliation and peace between the two Koreas to calm the tensions that are circling the peninsula, introducing the risk of a new conflict. The inaugural Mass was attended by Cardinal Cheong, Culture Minister Choe Kwang-shik, Apostolic Nuncio Archbishop Osvaldo Padilla, political leaders including former opposition leader Sohn Hak-kyu, Rep. Kang Ki-gap and Gyeonggi Governor Kim Moon-soo. As Archbishop of Seoul, Yeom heads the largest local Church in the Koreas and is also the apostolic administrator of Pyongyang, the North Korean capital.

Yeom received the pallium from Pope Benedict XVI on 29 June 2012.

== Cardinal ==
Pope Francis named Yeom to the College of Cardinals on 22 February 2014. As a Cardinal-Priest of the titular church of San Crisogono. Yeom is the third Korean national to be made cardinal, following Cardinals Nicholas Cheong Jin-Suk and Stephen Kim Sou-hwan. On 23 February, a celebratory ceremony was held at Seoul's Myeongdong Cathedral, where he said, "I will make efforts to realize Pope Francis' vision of a Church toiling for the poor and those on the margins of society and to make it a Church serving the community. ... I respect efforts made by late Cardinal Kim and Cardinal Cheong, and will add mine to them." His appointment as cardinal was welcomed by many Koreans, though only 11 percent of the country is Catholic. On 22 May 2014, he was named member of the Congregation for the Evangelization of Peoples and the Congregation for the Clergy. On 4 October 2014, he took possession of the title of San Crisogono. By papal appointment, he participated in Third Extraordinary General Assembly of the Synod of Bishops from 5 to 19 October 2014 on the theme "The Pastoral Challenges of the Family in the Context of Evangelization".

Pope Francis accepted his resignation as archbishop of Seoul on 28 October 2021.

== Coat of arms ==
Arms of Yeom Soo Jung as Archbishop of Seoul.

The coat of arms of Archbishop Yeom features the Traditional Red Hat, or the galero, replaces the Green one with its 15 tassels dangling in two five-tiered formations from either side. Below the Red Hat is the Crucifix symbolizes the Holy Martyrs of Korea who were the victims of religious persecution against the Catholic Church during the Joseon dynasty in the 19th century.

The shield is a symbol of God's salvation, and the three Rainbow colors: Purple (Love), Blue (Hope) and Green (Faith). The Herald of a new life, Dove, symbol of peace as a messenger came in the past, and will come in the present and future, and the spirit of the Lord brings into the presence among us even today and revealed that symbolizes the Holy Spirit. The Big Star in the center represents the Virgin Mary as she protects the two shining stars below symbolizing the peaceful reunification between the Democratic People's Republic of Korea and Republic of Korea. An anchor cross and the two Greek letters "A" (Alpha) and "Ω" (Omega) that all the hopes and aspirations of the Korean People will be in the God's plan. The background's color Blue, Yellow, and Red symbolize Peace, Sharing, and Sacrifice.

Archbishop Yeom's Latin motto is taken from the Book of Revelation 22:20, Amen. Veni, Domine Jesu! meaning "Amen. Come, Lord Jesus!"

== Views ==
Yeom's pastoral approach is also characterised by a respect for life and the mission. Respect for life is an aspect that is especially important to the Korean Church. The Church has focused its missionary work primarily on Asia.

=== Reconciliation between North and South Korea ===
On 21 May 2014 Yeom became the first Korean Roman Catholic leader to cross the inter-Korean border into the North. Accompanied by South Korean priests, he traveled to a joint north–south industrial park in Kaesong, North Korea, to tour the complex and meet South Koreans working there. Yeom told reporters after his return from the one-day visit that seeing South and North Koreans working in harmony gave him hope that the two countries can "overcome their pain and sorrow." The joint industrial park, located just north of the heavily armed border, is the last remaining cross-border rapprochement project between the rival Koreas.

== See also ==
- Stephen Kim Sou-hwan
- Nicolas Cheong Jin-suk
- Roman Catholicism in South Korea
- Cardinals created by Francis

Catholic Church titles
Preceded by Michael John Sheridan	— TITULAR — Titular Bishop of Thibiuca; 1 December 2001 – 10 May 2012	Succeeded by Eugenio Coter
Preceded by Nicholas Cheong Jin-suk	Archbishop of Seoul; 10 May 2012 – 28 October 2021	Succeeded by Peter Chung Soon-taick
Preceded by Nicholas Cheong Jin-suk	Apostolic Administrator of Pyongyang; 10 May 2012 – 28 October 2021	Succeeded by Peter Chung Soon-taick
Preceded by Paul Shan Kuo-hsi	Cardinal Priest of San Crisogono; 22 February 2014 – present	Incumbent
