= Timothy Yu Gyoung-chon =

South Korean bishop (1962–2025)

The Most Reverend Timothy Yu Gyoung-chon
- Auxiliary Bishop of Seoul
- Church: Catholic
- Archdiocese: Seoul
- Appointed: December 30, 2013
- Term ended: August 15, 2025
- Other post: Titular Bishop of Puppi

Orders
- Ordination: January 30, 1992
- Consecration: February 5, 2014 by Andrew Yeom Soo-jung

Personal details
- Born: September 4, 1962 Jungnim-dong, Seoul, South Korea
- Died: August 15, 2025 (aged 62) Seoul, South Korea

Timothy Yu Gyoung-chon (Korean: 유경촌; September 4, 1962 – August 15, 2025) was a South Korean Catholic prelate who served as an auxiliary bishop for the Archdiocese of Seoul from 2013 to 2025.

== Biography ==
Yu Gyoung-chon was born on September 4, 1962 in Seoul, the youngest of four sons and two daughters to Yu Tak (Peter) and Park Geum-soon (Lucia).

Yu Gyoung-chon, who was baptized at Seodaemun Cathedral in the first year of middle school following his second sister; he volunteered at Myeongdong Cathedral from then on. In 1978, he entered Seongshin High School in Seoul.

After graduating from the Catholic University of Korea, he went to Germany to study abroad for four years in 1988, and after studying at the University of Würzburg, he obtained a doctorate in theology from St. George's University in Frankfurt with a thesis on the topic of The Problem of Preservation of the Created Order in the Council Process, and was ordained a priest in 1992.

He then moved to the position of professor at the Catholic University of Korea, and served as the director of the Institute for Integrated Pastoral Affairs of the Archdiocese of Seoul from 2008 to 2013 and published the Regulations of the Archdiocese of Seoul. He was appointed the head of Myeongil-dong Parish on August 27, 2013, followed by auxiliary bishop of the Archdiocese of Seoul on December 30, 2013, just over four months later.

Yu died at the Seoul St. Mary's Hospital on August 15, 2025, after battling biliary tract cancer, at age 62.

Catholic Church titles
| Preceded by — | Auxiliary Bishop of Seoul; 2013–2025 | Succeeded by — |
| Preceded by Montfort Stima | Titular Bishop of Puppi; 2013–2025 | Succeeded by Vacant |
