= List of Catholic dioceses in Korea =

The Catholic Church of all Korea is united under a single episcopal conference for the entire politically divided peninsula. All territorial jurisdictions in Korea are part of the Latin Church, covering both South Korea and North Korea, comprising:

- three ecclesiastical provinces, each headed by a metropolitan bishop seated in an archdiocese, and a total of 14 suffragan dioceses
- the Military Ordinariate of South Korea.
- the pre-diocesan Territorial Abbey of Tokwon, in North Korea

Catholic hierarchy in Korea.

== Latin provinces of Korea ==
=== Ecclesiastical Province of Seoul, including North Korea ===
- Archdiocese of Seoul (also partially in North Korea)
  - Diocese of Chuncheon (also partially in North Korea)
  - Diocese of Daejeon
  - Diocese of Hamhung (in North Korea)
  - Diocese of Incheon
  - Diocese of Pyongyang (in North Korea)
  - Diocese of Suwon
  - Diocese of Uijeongbu
  - Diocese of Wonju

=== Ecclesiastical Province of Kwangju, in South Korea ===
- Archdiocese of Gwangju
  - Diocese of Jeju
  - Diocese of Jeonju

=== Ecclesiastical Province of Daegu, in South Korea ===
- Archdiocese of Daegu
  - Diocese of Andong
  - Diocese of Cheongju
  - Diocese of Masan
  - Diocese of Busan

== Exempt jurisdictions sui iuris ==
- Military Ordinariate of (South) Korea
- Territorial Abbey of Tokwon (alias Tŏkugen abbey, with a cathedral see), in North Korea

== Defunct jurisdictions ==
There are no titular sees.

All former prelatures have current successor jurisdictions, notably as result of promotions.

== Sources and external links ==
- GCatholic.org.
- Catholic-Hierarchy entry.
