= Jeondong Cathedral =

Coordinates: 35.8135°N 127.1490°E

- 전동성당
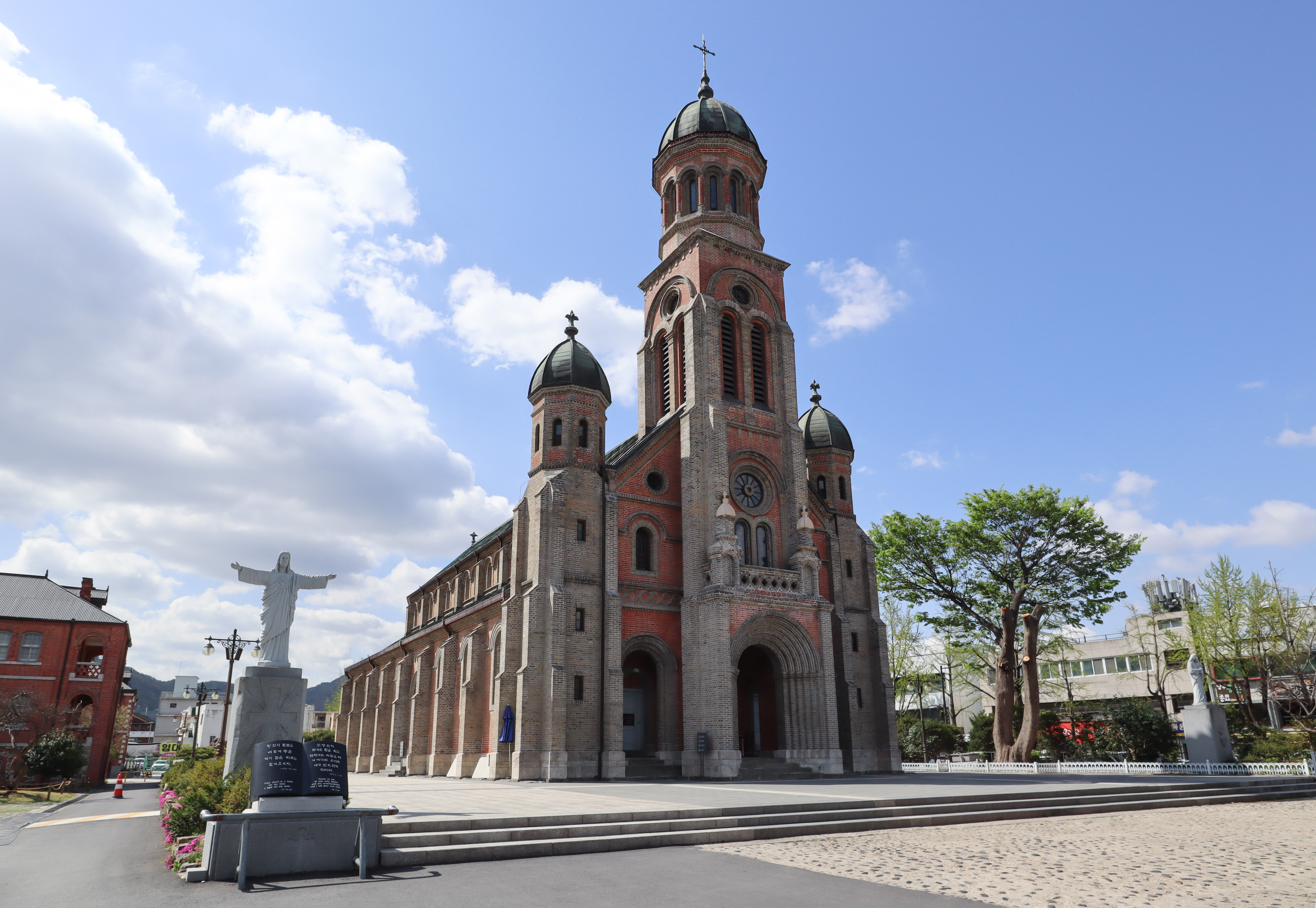
- Jeondong Cathedral
- Location: Jeonju
- Country: South Korea
- Denomination: Roman Catholic Church

Architecture
- Heritage designation: Historic Sites of South Korea
- Designated: 1981-09-25

The Jeondong Cathedral (Korean: 전동성당) also known as the Old Cathedral of Jeondong and now as the Jeondong Church of Francis Xavier is an important Catholic church in Jeonju, South Korea.

The cathedral building, of Roman-Byzantine style, was built between 1908 and 1914 by Victor Louis Poisnel (1855–1925). It is in the territory and under the supervision of François-Xavier Baudounet (1859–1915), a French priest, born in Mostuéjouls in Aveyron, in the same place where many Christians were martyred. This church, located in the city center, near the traditional Jeonju Hanok Village, is a historic site (KB) #288.

Currently a parish church, the cathedral belongs to the Diocese of Jeonju (Dioecesis Ieoniuensis or 전주 교구).

Sacred Heart Kindergarten is a facility attached to the cathedral, while Jeonju Sacred Heart Girls' Middle School (Wheein and Hwasa's former school) and Jeonju Sacred Heart Girls' High School are nearby.

== See also ==
- Roman Catholicism in South Korea
- Myeongdong Cathedral
