= Peter Han Kong-ryel =

South Korean Bishop (1913–1973)

- Archbishop of Gwangju
- Native name: 한공렬
- Church: Catholic Church
- Archdiocese: Archdiocese of Gwangju
- In office: 28 June 1971 – 7 March 1973
- Predecessor: Harold William Henry
- Successor: Victorinus Youn Kong-hi
- Previous posts: Bishop of Jeonju (1962-1971); Vicar Apostolic of Jeonju (1961-1962); Titular Bishop of Sagalassus (1961-1962)

Orders
- Ordination: 24 June 1939
- Consecration: 12 March 1961 by Gregorio Pietro Agagianian

Personal details
- Born: 3 February 1913 Jinsen, Keiki Province, Chōsen, Empire of Japan
- Died: 7 March 1973 (aged 60) Myeong-dong, Seoul, South Korea

Peter Han Kong-ryel (Korean: 한공렬; 3 February 1913 – 7 March 1973) was a South Korean prelate of the Catholic Church who served as the 4th Bishop of the Diocese of Jeonju and the 6th Bishop of the Archdiocese of Gwangju.

== Early life ==
He was born on 3 February 1913, in Incheon, Korea, Empire of Japan. He graduated from Gyeongbok Middle School in 1933 and graduated from the Sacred Heart Seminary in 1939. On 24 June 1939, he was ordained a priest at Myeongdong Cathedral. In 1961, while serving as the Dean of Sungshin University, he was appointed Bishop of Jeonju. On 14 July 1971, he was appointed as the Archbishop of Gwangju. He passed away in 1973 at Myeongdong St. Mary's Hospital.

== See also ==
- Roman Catholic Diocese of Jeonju
