= Catholic Church in South Korea =

- Korean: 한국의 가톨릭 교회
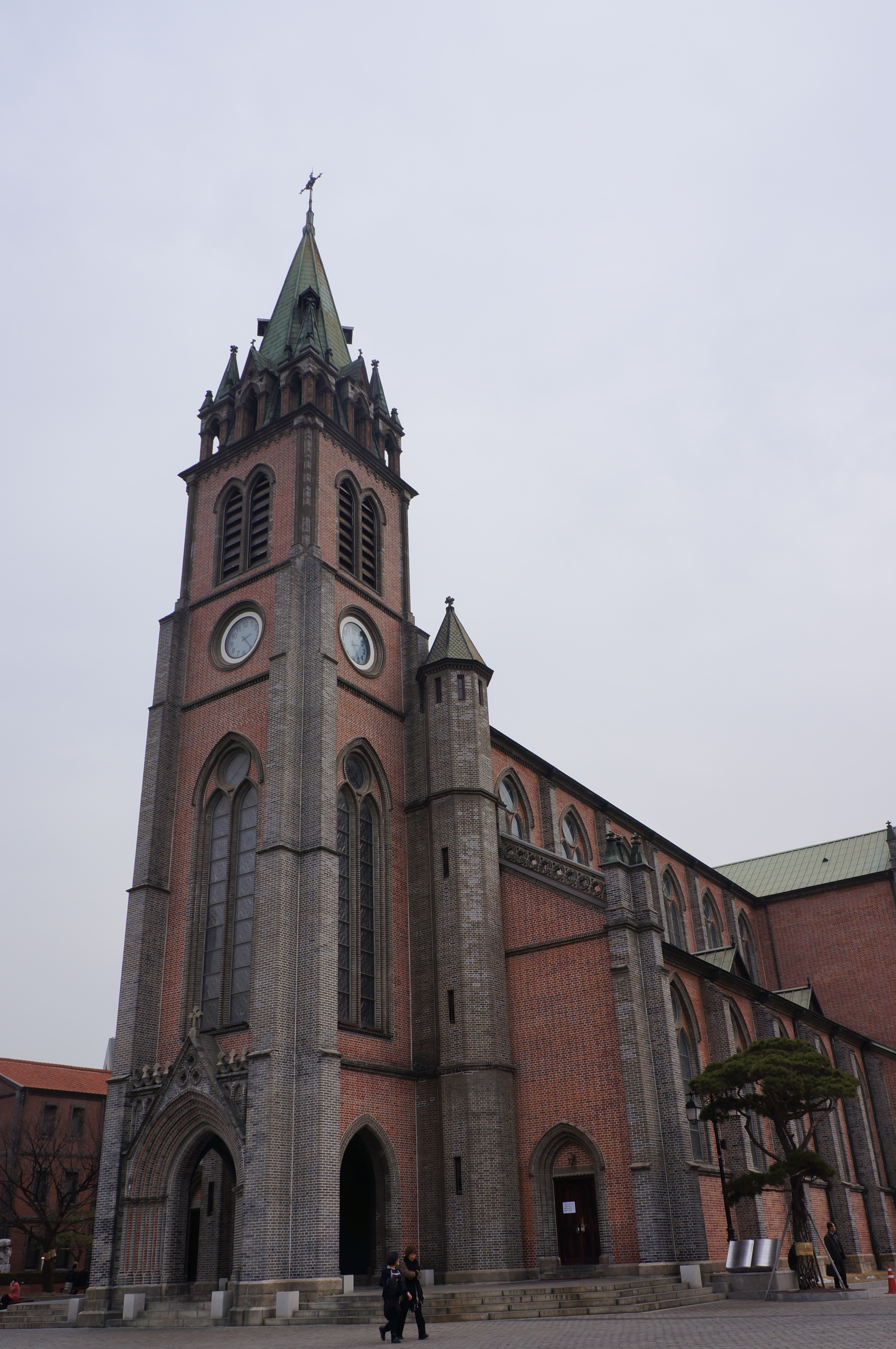
- Cathedral Church of Virgin Mary of the Immaculate Conception
- Type: National polity
- Classification: Catholic
- Orientation: Asian Christianity, Latin
- Scripture: Bible
- Theology: Catholic theology
- Governance: Catholic Bishops' Conference of Korea
- Pope: Leo XIV
- President: Matthias Ri Iong-hoon
- Apostolic Nuncio: Giovanni Gaspari
- Region: South Korea
- Language: Ecclesiastical Latin, Korean
- Headquarters: Seoul
- Origin: 27 December 1593
- Number of followers: 5,970,675 (11.3% of the population) in 2023
- Other name: 천주교/天主敎 ("Religion of the Lord of Heaven")
- Official website: english.cbck.or.kr

The Catholic Church in South Korea (called Cheonjugyo, Korean: 천주교; Hanja: 天主敎; lit. 'Religion of the Lord of Heaven') is part of the worldwide Catholic Church, under the spiritual leadership of the Pope in Rome.

In 2023, it had 5,970,675 adherents (11.3% of the population) with almost 5,000 priests and 9,000 nuns serving across 1,842 parishes.

== History ==
Spanish Jesuit priest Gregorio Céspedes was possibly the first Catholic missionary in Korea, said to have arrived in Busan on 27 December 1593. At the time of the Japanese invasions of Korea (1592–1598), Japanese leader Konishi Yukinaga married a Korean Christian woman, who had adopted Julia as her name. Macau received an influx of African slaves, Japanese slaves as well as Christian Korean slaves who were bought by the Portuguese from the Japanese after they were taken prisoner during the Japanese invasions of Korea.

However, Catholicism (and Christianity in general) in Korea more generally began in 1784 when Yi Seung-hun was baptized while in China under the Christian name of Peter. He later returned to Korea carrying religious texts, and baptized many fellow countrymen. The Church in Korea continued to grow without formal missionary priests.

During the 19th century, the Catholic Church was targeted by the government of the Joseon dynasty chiefly for the religion's opposition to ancestral "worship", which the Church perceived to be a form of idolatry, but which the state prescribed as a cornerstone of Korean culture.

Despite a century-long persecution that produced thousands of martyrs – 103 of whom were canonized by Pope John Paul II in May 1984, including the first Korean priest, St. Andrew Taegon Kim, who was ordained in 1845 and martyred in 1846 – the Church in Korea expanded. The Apostolic Vicariate of Korea was formed in 1831, and after the expansion of the Church structure over the next century, the current structure of the three Metropolitan Provinces, each with an Archdiocese and several suffragan Dioceses, was established in 1962.

In 1899, "the Sinch'uk Rebellion, a Confucian-led and -organised popular uprising", made a "most barbarous massacre" of from 500 to 600 victims. It was in reaction to promises of tax exemptions by lay-assistants and desecration of "spirit-shrines" by Catholics, after the arrival of two French priests to Cheju.

== Current status ==
Government surveys showed that in 2020, more than 45% of South Koreans practice no religion, that about 22% are Buddhists, and that 29.2% are Christians with 11.1% being Catholics and 18% being Protestants, meaning that Christianity is the largest religion.

The Catholic Church in South Korea has grown significantly in recent years, with membership rising from 7.9% to 11.3% of the population between 1997 and 2021, though its share of the overall population has remained steady since 2021. At the end of 2017 there were 5,813,770 Catholics in South Korea – 11.0% of the population. In 2017, the Church grew by 1.3%, with over 75,000 adult baptisms. Part of this growth can be attributed to the Church's relatively positive perception by the general public because of its role in the democratization of South Korea, its active participation in various works of social welfare, and its respectful approach to interfaith relationship and matters of traditional Korean spirituality.

There are 15 dioceses including three archdioceses – Seoul, Daegu, and Gwangju – and a military ordinariate.

In North Korea under the communist regime, Christianity is officially suppressed, and unofficial estimates by South Korean Church officials place the number of Catholics there at only 5,000. The North Korean Catholic Church, ecclesiastically united with South Korea, is composed of the two dioceses of Diocese of Pyongyang and Diocese of Hamhung (suffragan to the Metropolitan Archbishop of Seoul), and the only territorial abbey outside Europe, the Territorial Abbey of Tokwon or Dokwon.

South Korea (and by extension the Catholic Church in all Korea, north and south) has the fourth largest number of saints in the Catholic Church since 1984 as categorized by nation, a number which includes the Korean Martyrs.

=== Pope Francis' visit ===
Pope Francis accepted an invitation to visit South Korea in August 2014. The four-day visit (14–18 August) culminated with a Papal Mass at Myeongdong Cathedral, the seat of the Archdiocese of Seoul on 18 August. During a mass on 16 August, the Pope beatified 124 Korean Catholic martyrs. An invitation for North Korea's Catholics to attend was declined, due to South Korea's refusal to withdraw from military exercises which it had planned with the United States.

World Youth Day

In 2027, the Archdiocese of Seoul, South Korea, will be hosting World Youth Day, a weeklong, triennial gathering of Catholic youth and young adults from around the world. The theme of the 2027 World Youth Day is "Take Courage! I have overcome the world!", a quote from John's Gospel. The event will take place from August 3–8, 2027.

== Dioceses and archdioceses ==
South Korea has fifteen territorial dioceses (three archdioceses and twelve dioceses) and one military diocese:

Dioceses of Korea

=== Province of Seoul ===
- Archdiocese of Seoul; 서울대교구
- Diocese of Incheon; 인천교구
- Diocese of Suwon; 수원교구
- Diocese of Uijeongbu; 의정부교구
- Diocese of Chunchon; 춘천교구
- Diocese of Wonju; 원주교구
- Diocese of Daejeon; 대전교구

=== Province of Daegu ===
- Archdiocese of Daegu; 대구대교구
- Diocese of Busan; 부산교구
- Diocese of Andong; 안동교구
- Diocese of Masan; 마산교구
- Diocese of Cheongju; 청주교구

=== Province of Gwangju ===
- Archdiocese of Gwangju; 광주대교구
- Diocese of Jeonju; 전주교구
- Diocese of Jeju; 제주교구

=== Other ===
- Military Ordinariate of Korea; 군종교구

== Inculturation ==
Catholicism in South Korea is unique in that it has inculturated with traditional Confucian customs that form an integral part of traditional secular Korean culture. As a result, South Korean Catholics continue to practice ancestral rites and observe many Confucian customs and philosophies.

== See also ==
- Catholic Bishops' Conference of Korea
- Korean Catholic Bible
- Korean Martyrs
- List of Saints from Asia
- Christianity in Korea
- Jesa
- Seohak
- Catholic Persecution of 1801
- Catholic Priests Association for Justice
