= Nicholas Cheong Jin-suk =

South Korean Catholic cardinal (1931–2021)

His Eminence Nicholas Cheong Jin-suk
- Cardinal, Archbishop of Seoul
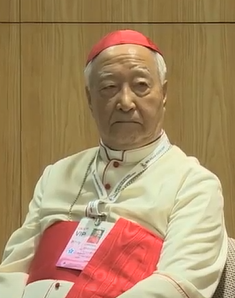
- The cardinal in 2014.
- Native name: 정진석
- Archdiocese: Seoul
- See: Seoul
- Appointed: 3 April 1998
- Installed: 29 June 1998
- Term ended: 10 May 2012
- Predecessor: Stephen Kim Sou-hwan
- Successor: Andrew Yeom Soo-jung
- Other post: Cardinal-Priest of Santa Maria Immacolata di Lourdes a Boccea
- Previous posts: Roman Catholic Bishop of Cheongju (1970–1998); Apostolic Administrator of P’yŏng-yang (1998-2012)

Orders
- Ordination: 18 March 1961 by Paul Roh Ki-nam
- Consecration: 3 October 1970 by Paul Roh Ki-nam
- Created cardinal: 24 March 2006 by Pope Benedict XVI
- Rank: Cardinal-Priest

Personal details
- Born: 7 December 1931 Seoul, Korea
- Died: 27 April 2021 (aged 89) Seoul, South Korea
- Denomination: Roman Catholic
- Education: Pontifical Urban University
- Motto: Omnibus omnia
- Coat of arms: Nicholas Cheong Jin-suk's coat of arms

- Nicholas Cheong Jin-suk
- Hangul: 정진석
- Hanja: 鄭鎭奭
- RR: Jeong Jinseok
- MR: Chŏng Chinsŏk

Styles of Nicholas Cheong Jin-Suk
- Reference style: His Eminence
- Spoken style: Your Eminence
- Religious style: Cardinal
- Informal style: Cardinal
- See: Seoul

Ordination history of Nicholas Cheong Jin-suk
History
Diaconal ordination
- Ordained by: 18 March 1961
Priestly ordination
- Ordained by: Paul Roh Ki-nam
Episcopal consecration
- Principal consecrator: Paul Roh Ki-nam
- Co-consecrators: James Vincent Pardy MM; Peter Han Kong-ryel
- Date: 3 October 1970
Cardinalate
- Elevated by: Pope Benedict XVI
- Date: 24 March 2006
Episcopal succession
Bishops consecrated by Nicholas Cheong Jin-suk as principal consecrator
- Gabriel Chang Bong-hun: 24 August 1999
- Joseph Lee Han-taek SJ: 25 January 2002
- Andrew Yeom Soo-jung: 25 January 2002
- Lucas Kim Woon-hoe: 21 November 2002
- Basil Cho Kyu-man: 25 January 2006

Nicholas Cheong Jin-suk (Korean: 정진석; Hanja: 鄭鎭奭; 7 December 1931 – 27 April 2021) was a South Korean Cardinal of the Roman Catholic Church. He served as Archbishop of Seoul from 1998 until he retired in 2012. He was previously Bishop of Cheongju from 1970 to 1998. He was made a cardinal in 2006.

== Biography ==
Cheong Jin-suk briefly studied chemical engineering at the Seoul National University before entering the seminary in Seoul, from where he later obtained his bachelor's degree in theology, in 1954. After studying sociology in Hong Kong, he was ordained to the priesthood by Archbishop Paul Roh Ki-nam on 18 March 1961 at the Myeongdong Cathedral in Seoul.

Cheong then did pastoral work in Seoul until becoming a professor at its minor seminary and notary of its archdiocesan curia in 1962. He was chancellor of the curia and undersecretary of the Catholic Conference from 1964 to 1965, and episcopal chancellor and vice-rector of the Minor Seminary from 1966 to 1967. He then earned a degree in canon law, studying at the Pontifical Urban University, from October 1968 to 1970.

On 25 June 1970, Cheong was appointed the second Bishop of Cheongju by Pope Paul VI. He was the youngest bishop in Korea at the time. He received his episcopal consecration on the following 3 October from Archbishop Kinam Ro, with Bishops James Pardy, MM, and Peter Han Kong-ryel serving as co-consecrators, in the Church of the Holy Family in Cheongju. He was elected to a three-year term as president of the Korean Episcopal Conference in 1996.

Cheong was appointed the third Archbishop of Seoul on 3 April 1998. In addition to his duties in Seoul, he was made Apostolic Administrator of P'yong-yang on 6 June of that same year.

Pope Benedict XVI created him Cardinal-Priest of Santa Maria Immacolata di Lourdes a Boccea in the consistory of 24 March 2006. Cheong was appointed to the executive committee of the Pontifical Council for the Family on the following 6 May, and to the Council of Cardinals for the Study of the Organizational and Economic Problems of the Holy See on 3 February 2007. He was later appointed a member of the Pontifical Council for Social Communications.

On his 80th birthday, 7 December 2011, Cheong lost his curial memberships. His resignation as archbishop was accepted by Pope Benedict XVI on 10 May 2012 and he was succeeded by Andrew Yeom Soo-jung.

Cheong died at Saint Mary's Hospital in Seoul at the age of 89 on 27 April 2021. He had celebrated sixty years of his priesthood the previous month. He had been admitted to hospital on 21 February with critical health issues such as breathing difficulties and a slight fever and his successor Cardinal Yeom Soo-jung administered the Anointing of the Sick on 22 February. By the first week of March, Cheong's condition seemed to improve upon the removal of life-sustaining equipment, barring the intravenous, with reports that his blood pressure and oxygen levels were gradually returning to normal. He was adamant that he would not have any surgery, nor would he remain connected to any equipment that would prolong his life. He also signed up for organ donation in the event of his death.

Catholic Church titles
Preceded by James Vincent Pardy	Bishop of Cheongju; 25 June 1970 – 3 April 1998	Succeeded by Gabriel Chang Bong-hun
Preceded by Paul Ri Moun-hi	President of the Korean Bishops' Conference; 1996 – 1999	Succeeded by Michael Pak Jeong-il
Preceded by Stephen Kim Sou-hwan	Archbishop of Seoul; 3 April 1998 – 10 May 2012	Succeeded by Andrew Yeom Soo-jung
Preceded by Stephen Kim Sou-hwan	Apostolic Administrator of Pyongyang; 3 April 1998 – 10 May 2012	Succeeded by Andrew Yeom Soo-jung
Preceded by Juan Francisco Fresno Larraín	Cardinal-Priest of Santa Maria Immacolata di Lourdes a Boccea; 24 March 2006 – 27 April 2021	Succeeded by Richard Baawobr
