= Roman Catholic Diocese of Jeonju =

Roman Catholic diocese in South Korea

Coordinates: 35.8167°N 127.1330°E

Diocese of Jeonju Dioecesis Ieoniuensis 전주교구
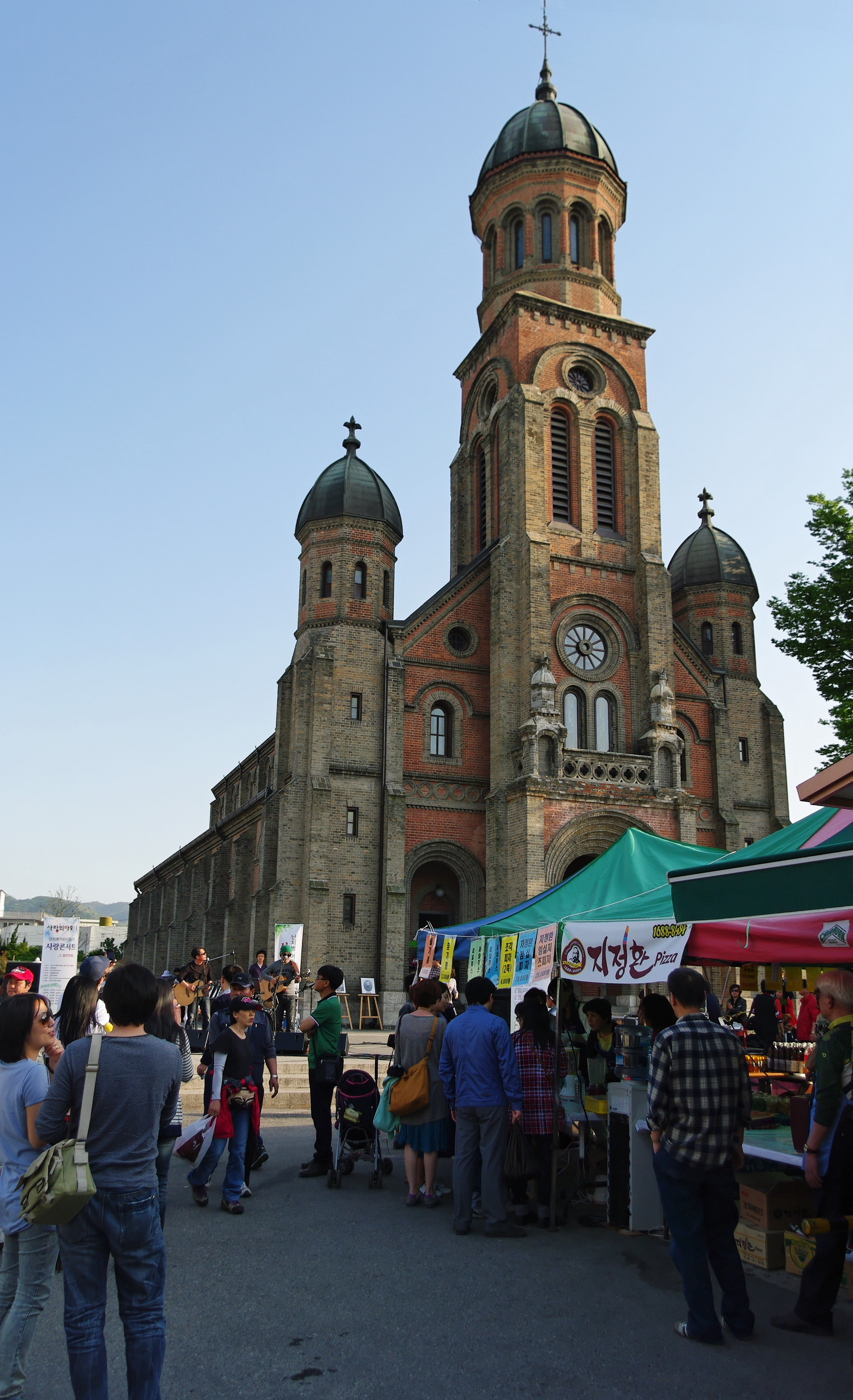

Location
- Country: South Korea
- Territory: North Jeolla
- Ecclesiastical province: Gwangju
- Metropolitan: Gwangju

Statistics
- Area: 8,067 km^{2} (3,115 sq mi)
- Population: Total; Catholics: (as of 2017); 1,854,607; 201,690 (11.1%)
- Parishes: 96

Information
- Denomination: Catholic
- Sui iuris church: Latin Church
- Rite: Roman Rite
- Established: 13 April 1937 (89 years ago)
- Cathedral: Cathedral of the Sacred Heart of Jesus in Jeonju

Current leadership
- Pope: Leo XIV
- Bishop: John Kim Son-tae
- Metropolitan Archbishop: Simon Ok Hyun-jin
- Bishops emeritus: Vincent Ri Pyung-ho

Map

Website
- jcatholic.or.kr

The Diocese of Jeonju (Latin: Dioecesis Ieoniuensis) is a Latin Church ecclesiastical territory or diocese of the Catholic Church in South Korea. It is in the ecclesiastical province of the metropolitan Archdiocese of Gwangju, yet depends on the missionary Dicastery for Evangelization.

Its cathedra is in the Joongang Cathedral of the Sacred Heart of Jesus, in the episcopal see of Jeonju 전주시, Jeollabuk-do 전라북도. It also has a former cathedral, now Jeondong Church of the Sacred Heart of Jesus, in Jeonju. Both are named for the Sacred Heart of Jesus.

== History ==
- Established on 13 April 1937 by Pope Pius XI as the Apostolic Prefecture of Zenshu, on territory split off from the then Apostolic Vicariate of Taiku
- Renamed on 12 July 1950 by Pope Pius XII as Apostolic Prefecture of Jeonju 전주 / Chŏnju / 全州 (正體中文) / Ieoniuen(sis) (Latin)
- Promoted on 21 January 1957 as Apostolic Vicariate of Jeonju 전주 / Chŏnju / 全州 (正體中文) / Ieoniuen(sis) (Latin), hence entitled to a titular bishop.
- Promoted again by Pope John XXIII on 10 March 1962 as Diocese of Jeonju 전주 / Chŏnju / 全州 (正體中文) / Ieoniuen(sis) (Latin)

== Statistics ==
As of 2014, it pastorally served 190,465 Catholics (10.2% of 1,872,965 total) on 8,066 km^{2} in 93 parishes and 5 missions with 213 priests (209 diocesan, 4 religious), 341 lay religious (7 brothers, 334 sisters) and 42 seminarians.

== Ordinaries ==
=== Apostolic Prefects of Zenshu ===
- Stephen Kim Yang-hong (1937–1941)
- Paul Jae-yong Ju (1941–1946)
- Bartolomeo Hyun-bae Kim (1947–1950)

=== Apostolic Prefects of Jeonju ===
- Bartolomeo Hyun-bae Kim (1950–1957)

=== Apostolic Vicars of Jeonju ===
- Bartolomeo Hyun-bae Kim (1957–1960)
- Peter Han Kong-ryel (1961–1962)

=== Bishops of Jeonju ===
- Peter Han Kong-ryel (1962–1971), appointed Archbishop of Gwangju
- Augustine Jae-deok Kim (1973–1981)
- Michael Pak Jeong-il (1982–1988), appointed Bishop of Masan
- Vincent Ri Pyung-ho (1990–2017)
- John Kim Son-tae (2017–present)

== See also ==
- List of Catholic Dioceses in Korea

== Sources and external links ==
- GCatholic, with Google map and satellite photo - data for all sections
- Catholic-Hierarchy - Diocese of Jeonju {Chonju, Jeon Ju
