= CBCK =

CBCK may refer to:

- Catholic Bishops' Conference of Korea
- CBCK (radio station), a radio station associated with CBO-FM
