= Simon Ok Hyun-jin =

Most Reverend Simon Ok Hyun-jin
- Archbishop of Gwangju
- Native name: 옥현진 시몬
- Church: Catholic Church
- Diocese: Archdiocese of Gwangju
- Predecessor: Hyginus Kim Hee-jong
- Successor: "Incumbent"
- Other post: General Secretary of Catholic Bishops’ Conference of Korea

Orders
- Ordination: January 26, 1994
- Consecration: July 6, 2011 by Hyginus Kim Hee-jong

Personal details
- Born: March 5, 1968 (age 58) Gwangju, South Korea
- Motto: 내 안에 머물러라

- Simon Ok Hyun-jin
- Hangul: 옥현진
- Hanja: 玉賢進
- RR: Ok Hyeonjin
- MR: Ok Hyŏnjin

Simon Ok Hyun-jin (born March 5, 1968) is the 6th Archbishop of Gwangju.

== Biography ==
Ok was ordained a priest on January 26, 1994.

On May 12, 2011, Pope Benedict XVI appointed him Auxiliary Bishop of Gwangju and Titular Bishop of Pederodiana. He was consecrated bishop on July 6, 2011 by Hyginus Kim Hee-jong, Archbishop of Gwangju. Co-consecrators were Andreas Choi Chang-mou, Archbishop Emeritus of Gwangju; Peter Kang U-il, Bishop of Cheju; and Victorinus Youn Kong-hi, Archbishop Emeritus of Gwangju.

Catholic Church titles
Preceded by Fabián Marulanda López	— TITULAR — Titular Bishop of Pederodiana; 12 May 2011 – 30 November 2022	Succeeded by Federico Guillermo Wechsung
Preceded by Hyginus Kim Hee-jong	Archbishop of Gwangju; 30 November 2022 –	Incumbent
