= Owen McPolin =

Rev. Owen McPolin((임 오엔)) SSC. MA, STL, (1889–1963) was an Irish priest who served on missions to China and Korea.

== Biography ==
Born in Hilltown, County Down, Ireland, in 1889, McPolin, went to Maynooth College where he was ordained in 1913 for the Diocese of Dromore, and became a professor at the Maynooth, in 1919 he joined the Maynooth Mission to China (which became the Columban fathers), and with the founders of the Society Fr. John Blowick and Fr. Edward Galvin, was part of the first mission to China, arriving on the Yawata Maru, Shanghai, in June 1920, and Fr Polin was to serve in China for six years. McPolin was the leader of the first Columban mission to Korea in 1933.

Monsignor McPolin served as the Apostolic Prefect in the Roman Catholic Archdiocese of Gwangju from 1937 until 1943, he also served as the first Apostolic Administrator of the Roman Catholic Diocese of Chunchon, Korea, from 1939 until 1941. He was placed under house arrest by the Japanese during the Second World war, he served as Apostolic Prefect in the Archdiocese of Gwangju again from 1945 until 1947. From 1948 to his death in 1963 he taught at an American and then at an Irish seminary.

A number of Owen McPolin's family served in the church including his uncles, the Very Rev. Murtagh McPolin, P.P., Loughbrickland, Co. Down, and Very Rev. Eugene McPolin, P.P.(1923-1941), St. Colmans' Catholic Church, Kilwarlin, Co. Down.

He died in late February 1963.

== See also ==
- Catholic Church in China
- Catholic Church in Korea
