= Paul Kim Ok-kyun =

Paul Kim Ok-kyun (Korean: 김옥균 바오로, December 9, 1925 – March 1, 2010) was the Roman Catholic titular bishop of Girba and the auxiliary bishop of the Roman Catholic Archdiocese of Seoul, South Korea.

Ordained to the priesthood on December 18, 1954, Kim Ok-kyun was appointed auxiliary bishop of the Seoul Archdiocese on March 9, 1985, and was ordained bishop on April 25, 1985, retiring on December 12, 2001.
