= Diocese of Uijeongbu =

Latin Catholic diocese in South Korea

Coordinates: 37°44′17″N 127°02′02″E

Diocese of Uijeongbu Dioecesis Uiiongbuensis 의정부교구
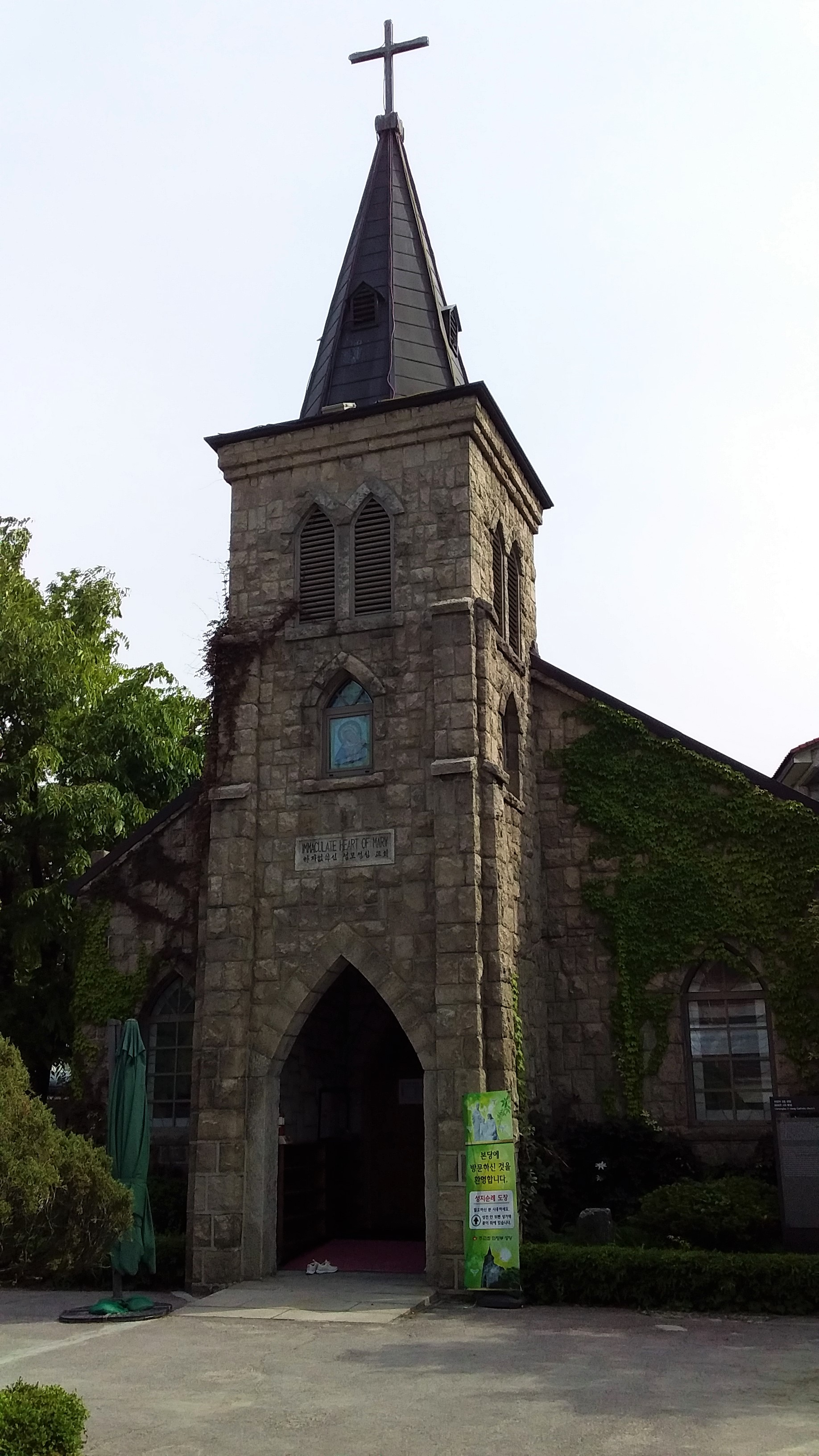
- Cathedral of the Sacred Heart of Mary

Location
- Country: South Korea
- Territory: Northern part of Gyeonggi
- Ecclesiastical province: Seoul
- Metropolitan: Seoul

Statistics
- Area: 2,594 km^{2} (1,002 sq mi)
- Population: Total; Catholics: (as of 2017); 3,141,806; 315,620 (10.3%)
- Parishes: 81

Information
- Denomination: Catholic
- Sui iuris church: Latin Church
- Rite: Roman Rite
- Established: 24 June 2004
- Cathedral: Cathedral of the Sacred Heart of Mary in Uijeongbu

Current leadership
- Pope: Leo XIV
- Bishop: Benedictus Son Hee-song (손희송 베네딕토)
- Metropolitan Archbishop: Andrew Yeom Soo-jung
- Bishops emeritus: Joseph Lee Han-taek, S.J.

Map

Website
- ucatholic.or.kr

The Diocese of Uijeongbu (Latin: Dioecesis Uijongbunensis), also romanized Uijongbu, is a particular church of the Latin Church of the Catholic Church in South Korea. It is the newest diocese in South Korea, erected from the Archdiocese of Seoul on June 24, 2004 by the orders of Pope John Paul II, and a suffragan diocese of the same. Its mother church is the Cathedral of the Sacred Heart of Mary in Uijeongbu, Gyeonggi-do.

== Bishops of Uijungbu ==
- Joseph Lee Han-taek (2004–2010)
- Peter Lee Ki-heon (2010–2024)
- Benedictus Son Hee-song (2024–present)
