= Pupput =

Archaeological site in Tunisia

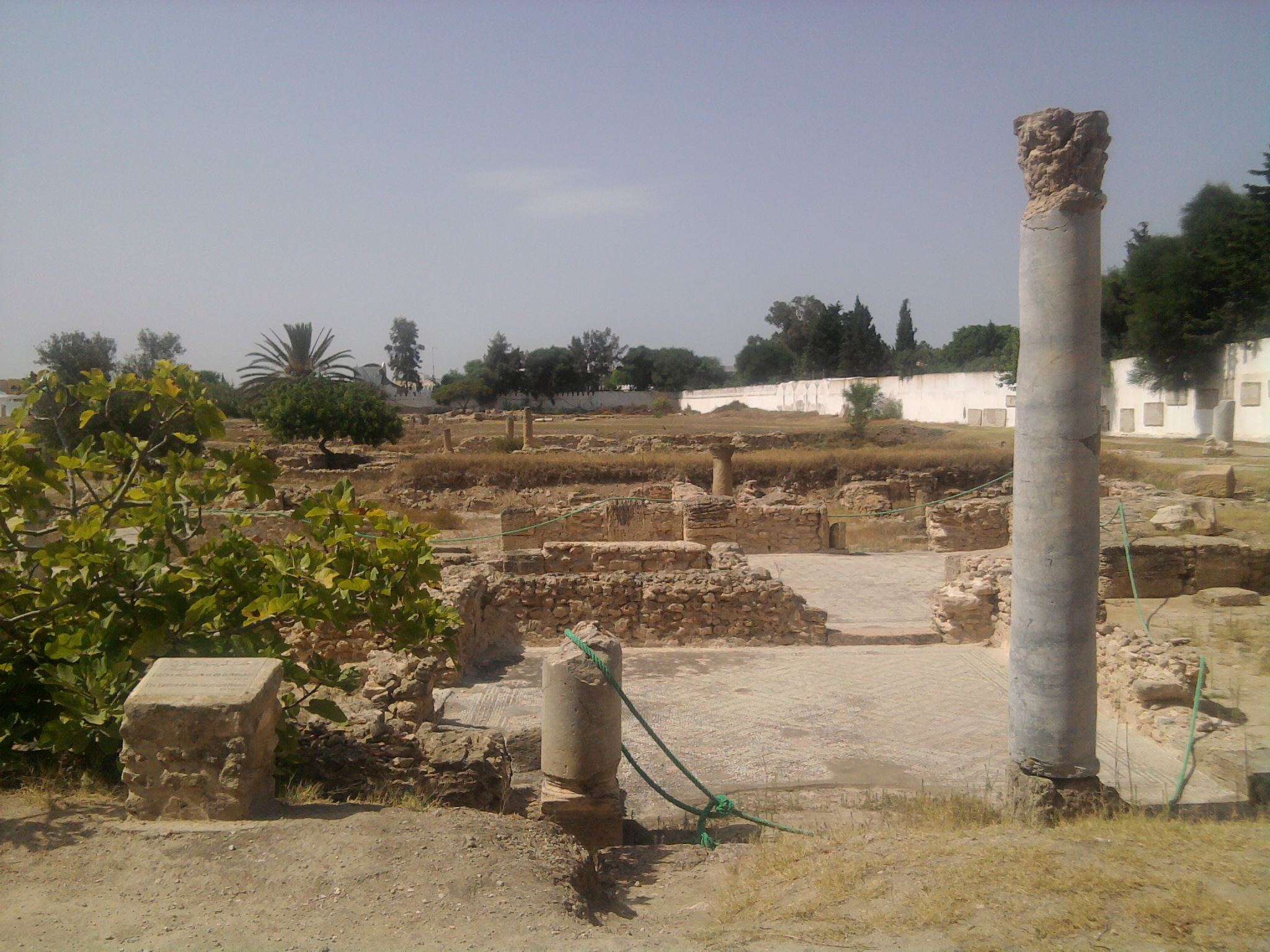
- Archaeological remains of Pupput

- Location within Tunisia
- 36°23′34″N 10°33′42″E
- Location: Tunisia
- Region: Nabeul Governorate

Pupput, also spelled "Putput", "Pudput", "Pulpud" (Latin: Pulpite), sometimes located in Souk el-Obiod ou Souk el-Abiod (Arabic: أبيض or "white market"), is a Colonia in the Roman province of Africa which has been equated with an archaeological site in modern Tunisia. It is situated on the coast near the town of Hammamet, between the two wadis of Temad (or el-Thimad) to the north and Moussa to the south. Much of the Pupput is buried under modern holiday developments which have been built over the major part of the site.

== History ==
=== Classical antiquity ===
This agricultural region, densely occupied in classical antiquity, has probably been inhabited since the 5th century BC by the Berbers and Carthaginians. There is a sanctuary and inscription at the ancient Punic city of Thinissut, located at modern Bir Bouregba, but no Punic remains have been identified on the site of Pupput itself.

A settlement existed here as early as the 1st century BC, and this may have been of Berber–Punic origin. It was a simple vicus in Carthaginian territory at the time of the Roman Emperor Antoninus Pius (2nd century AD). A statue of the Roman politician Salvius Julianus (c. 110–170) was erected in the center of Pupput. A native of the nearby town of Hadrumetum, he is thought to have been born in the village and it may be due to him that Pupput became an honorary Colonia under the Emperor Commodus (185-192). At this time the city was probably a satellite town of its neighbour Neapolis. The earliest documentary record of the city was in 168 when it was promoted to the status of a municipium governed by an elected council. It appears to have gained in importance during the 2nd and 3rd centuries, when it expanded considerably and a significant number of public monuments were built. According to an inscription preserved in the Bardo National Museum in Tunis which was dedicated to the 4th century Emperor Licinius, the Roman name of the city was "Colonia Aurelia Commoda Pia Felix Augusta Pupput".

Pupput's location, at the southern base of the Cape Bon peninsula, was the meeting point of two major roman roads – a north-south road linking Carthage to Hadrumetum and an east-west road linking the peninsula to the province's interior via Thuburbo Majus. North of Pupput was its densely packed main necropolis, over 7 hectares (17 acres) in size, dating from the late 1st or early 2nd centuries.

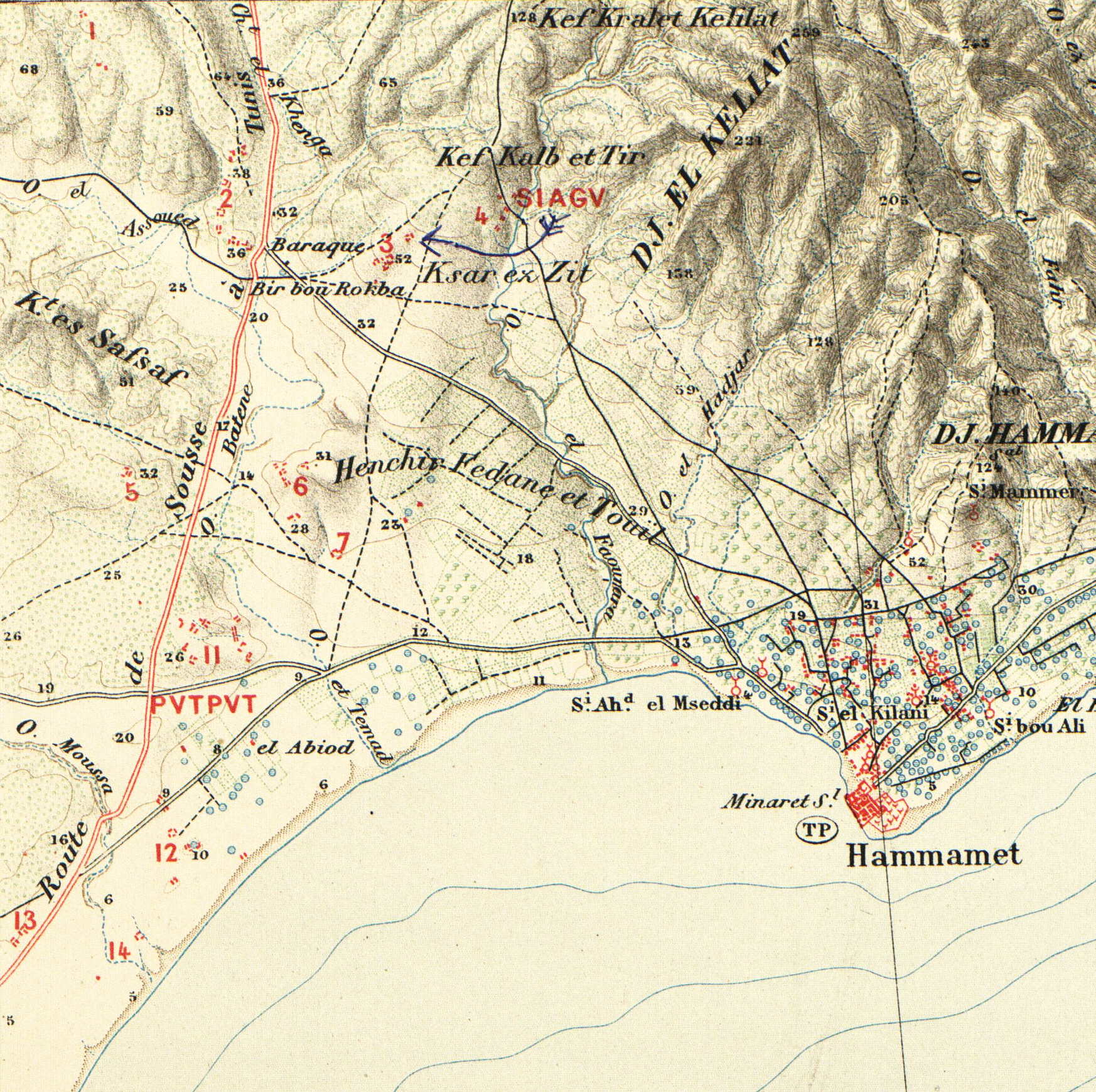
Extract from the Atlas archéologique de la Tunisie (1892), sites 11-12 and 14.

=== Late antiquity ===
The ancient city of Pupput would have become vicus again in late antiquity. An episcopal seat of Puppi, corresponding to the modern Souk-El-Abiodh south of Hammamet, is indicated in the lists of bishops of 411 (Donatist and Catholic), 484, 525 and 646. Puppi was the seat of an ancient Christian episcopal see of the Roman province of Africa Proconsolaris, a suffragan diocese of the Archdiocese of Carthage. There are records of six bishops of the Diocese of Puppi. Two of the bishops, the Catholic Pannonio and the Donatist Vittoriano, attended the Council of Carthage in 411 when Catholics and Donatists gathered together called to resolve the Donatist schism in Roman Africa. A third bishop, Aurelio, was an attendee of the Council of Chalcedon in 451. Bishop Pastinato attended the Vandal Synod of Carthage in 484 called by King Huneric in 484 in an attempt to persuade the Catholic bishops to convert to Arianism. After the synod Pastinato was exiled. Bishop Fortunato attended the Carthaginian Council of 525 and Bishop Guloso attended an anti-monothelite council in 646.

Although Puppi belonged to the ecclesiastical province of Africa Proconsolaris, Pupput was listed as part of the civil Roman province of Byzacena. To explain this discrepancy, some authors, such as Noël Duval, have suggested that boundary changes resulted in a "conurbation" of the city with Siagu (now Ksar Ezzit in the east of the town of Bir Bouregba), which was located in Africa Proconsularis, a few kilometers to the north.

Puppi survives today as a vacant titular bishopric. The last bishop was Timothy Yu Gyoung-chon, of Seoul (died 2025).

=== Middle Ages ===
In the Middle Ages, following the Vandal period, Pupput became a part of the Byzantine Empire, and a citadel was built to defend it. After the Arab conquest at the end of the seventh century, the whole of Tunisia passed under Arab domination and the city was renamed Qasr Zaid. The urban center then moved further north-east, to where the city of Hammamet was founded, near the baths (as the name suggests), on the site of the medina. The ancient buildings of Souk el-Obiod seem to have been abandoned following this final relocation. Pirates from the Spanish Kingdom of Aragón captured and destroyed the city in 1303, leaving it in ruins. The Pupput area was subsequently settled by charcoal burners from Hammamet.

== Remains ==
It was not until the late 19th century that the site was rediscovered by accident when an area was being levelled for construction. Some of Pupput's remains were partially unearthed in the early 20th century by battalions of the French army. At that time the site included a capitolium, temples, a theatre, an amphitheatre, thermae (baths) which gave nearby Hammamet its name (from hammam, Arabic: حمّام, romanized: ḥammām, lit. 'bath'), a water supply network including aqueduct parts and cisterns, and a Byzantine citadel. However, much of the site has not been preserved. In the late 1960s it was endangered by the development of hotel complexes along the Tunisian coast. Rescue archaeology revealed part of the Roman necropolis and a large residential quarter with mosaic flooring indicating high-status buildings. One of the residential buildings is the House of the Figured Peristyle, a large 5th century residence with its own bath house. The residential quarter and baths have been preserved as an archaeological park, but the remains of the central complex of monuments and the public buildings were buried beneath hotel foundations.

== Sources ==
- Mongne, Pascal (2005). Archéologie: vingt ans de recherches françaises dans le monde. Paris: Maisonneuve et Larose/ADPF.ERC. pp. 260–262. ISBN 9782706818738.
