= Hyginus Kim Hee-jong =

South Korean Catholic priest (born 1947)

- Archbishop Emeritus of Gwangju
- Church: Roman Catholic Church
- Archdiocese: Gwangju

Orders
- Ordination: 1975
- Consecration: 24 June 2003

Personal details
- Born: January 21, 1947 (age 79) Mokpo, South Jeolla Province, Korea
- Education: Pontifical Gregorian University

Korean name
- Hangul: 김희중
- Hanja: 金喜中
- RR: Gim Huijung
- MR: Kim Hŭijung

Hyginus Kim Hee-jong (Korean: 김희중; born January 21, 1947) is a Roman Catholic priest. He was the 5th Archbishop and current Archbishop Emeritus, of Gwangju. Born in Mokpo, South Jeolla Province, Korea in 1947, he was ordained a priest of the Archdiocese of Gwangju in 1975. On 24 June 2003, he was appointed Auxiliary Bishop of the Archdiocese.

On 25 March 2010, he succeeded Archbishop Andreas Choi Chang-mou. He was elected President of the Catholic Bishops' Conference of Korea in 2014.

Catholic Church titles
Preceded by Tarcisius Resto Phanrang	— TITULAR — Titular Bishop of Corniculana; 9 July 2003 – 25 March 2010	Succeeded by Jean de Dieu Raoelison
Preceded by Andreas Choi Chang-mou	Archbishop of Gwangju; 25 March 2010 – 19 November 2022	Succeeded by Simon Ok Hyun-jin
