= Stephen Kim Sou-hwan =

South Korean Roman Catholic cardinal and Servant of God

Servant of God Stephen Kim Sou-hwan
- Cardinal, Archbishop of Seoul
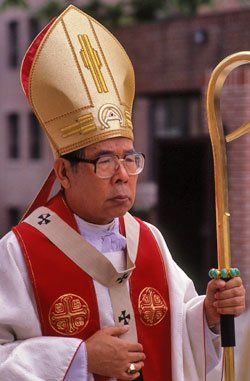
- Cardinal Kim in 1968
- Church: Catholic Church
- See: Seoul
- Installed: 9 April 1968
- Term ended: 3 April 1998
- Predecessor: Paul Roh Ki-nam
- Successor: Nicholas Cheong Jin-suk
- Other posts: Cardinal Protopriest (2004 – 2009) Cardinal-Priest of San Felice da Cantalice a Centocelle (1969 – 2009); Archbishop of Seoul (1966 – 1969)
- Previous posts: President of the CBCK (1970 – 1975, 1981 – 1987); Bishop of Masan (1966 – 1968)

Orders
- Ordination: 15 September 1951
- Consecration: 31 May 1966 by Antonio del Giudice
- Created cardinal: April 28, 1969 by Pope Paul VI
- Rank: Cardinal-Priest

Personal details
- Born: July 2, 1922 Daegu, Japanese Korea
- Died: February 16, 2009 (aged 86) Seoul, South Korea
- Denomination: Roman Catholic
- Motto: Pro vobis et pro multis (For you and for many)
- Coat of arms: Stephen Kim Sou-hwan's coat of arms

Korean name
- Hangul: 김수환
- Hanja: 金壽煥
- RR: Gim Suhwan
- MR: Kim Suhwan

Baptismal name
- Hangul: 스테파노
- RR: Seutepano
- MR: Sŭt'ep'ano

Styles of Stephen Kim Sou-hwan
- Reference style: His Eminence
- Spoken style: Your Eminence
- Informal style: Cardinal
- See: Seoul (Emeritus)

Stephen (often rendered as Latin Stephanus) Kim Sou-hwan (Korean: 김수환 스테파노; Hanja: 金壽煥 스테파노; July 2, 1922 – February 16, 2009) was a Korean prelate of the Catholic Church and the Korea's first elevated to the rank of cardinal. He is a former archbishop of Seoul, South Korea. Having been an iconic figure in South Korea's bloody and tumultuous transition from military rule to democracy, he was widely respected across all sections in South Korean society. He is venerated by the Roman Catholic Church having been declared Servant of God by Pope Francis.

== Early years ==
He was born in Daegu, modern-day South Korea, and attended high school in Seoul. He studied philosophy at Sophia University in Tokyo from 1941 to 1944, and at Catholic University of Korea in Seoul from 1947 to 1951, when he graduated. After serving briefly as a parish priest in Andong and then as a secretary in the Archdiocese of Daegu, he traveled to Germany to study sociology at Münster University from 1956 to 1963.

== Career ==
Kim was raised to the rank of cardinal-priest of San Felice da Cantalice a Centocelle by Pope Paul VI in the consistory of April 28, 1969, having become the archbishop of Seoul in 1968 after being the bishop of Masan since 1966. At the age of 46, he was the youngest member of the College of Cardinals at that time. He received the Mugunghwa medal in 1970, and participated in the two conclaves of 1978.

During Park Chung Hee and his successor's military dictatorship of the '70s and the '80s, the Korean Catholic Church under Kim's leadership was highlighted as a focal point of South Korea's democratization movement.

In 1998, Cardinal Kim retired as the archbishop of Seoul, shortly after serving as president-delegate of the Special Assembly for Asia of the World Synod of Bishops. On the death of Franz Koenig in 2004, he became the senior member of the college in terms of service, as he was the first of the three surviving members elevated in 1969 on the list of that consistory. However, Kim was ill at the time, and in the ceremonies of the sede vacante on the death of Pope John Paul II, the duties of protopresbyter (senior cardinal priest) were instead carried out by Eugenio de Araujo Sales, another 1969 cardinal who was Kim's junior as cardinal but senior as a priest and as a bishop.

Having reached the age of 80 in 2002, he did not participate in the ensuing conclave as he was no longer eligible to vote in papal elections. Cardinal Kim did arrive for the papal inauguration of Pope Benedict XVI and there he did discharge the duties of the cardinal protopresbyter. His duties at the papal inauguration included pronouncing the formal prayer for the new pope, and along with the cardinal protodeacon and senior Cardinal Bishop, make the public profession of obedience to the new pope on behalf of the College of Cardinals.

== Death ==
From 2007, Kim's health gradually deteriorated, and he was seldom seen in public, the last time being the 2008 Christmas Midnight Mass at Myeongdong Cathedral. He died in Seoul on February 16, 2009, from respiratory problems. During a four-day lying in state period some 400,000 Catholic mourners were said to have filed past his coffin in the city's Myeongdong Cathedral. He was buried on February 20. As per his will, he donated his organs, and the Cardinal's eyes were quickly used in two successful cornea transplants.

== Cause of beatification ==
On 5 July 2024, the Archdiocese of Seoul confirmed that the Dicastery for the Causes of Saints approved the beatification process of Cardinal Kim, who is now called a Servant of God.

== Written ==
- 이 땅에 평화를 - 김수환 추기경과의 대화, 1988 ISBN 6000324367
- 참으로 사람답게 살기위하여 - 김수환 추기경의 세상 사는 이야기 (사람과 사람, 1998) ISBN 9788985541022
- 우리가 서로 사랑한다는 것, 1999 ISBN 9788985541527
- 너희와 모든 이를 위하여, 1999 ISBN 9788985541534

== See also ==
- Beyond That Mountain, a 2020 biographical film based on Stephen Kim Sou-hwan's childhood.

Catholic Church titles
New title	Bishop of Masan; 15 February 1966 – 9 April 1968	Succeeded by Joseph Chang Byeong Hwa
Preceded by Paul Roh Ki-nam	Archbishop of Seoul; 9 April 1968 – 3 April 1998	Succeeded by Nicholas Cheong Jin-suk
Preceded by Paul Roh Ki-nam	President of the CBCK; 1970–1975	Succeeded by Victorinus Youn Kong-hi
Preceded by Victorinus Youn Kong-hi	President of the CBCK; 1981–1987	Succeeded by Angelo Kim Nam-su
Preceded by Franz König	Cardinal Protopriest; 2004–2009	Succeeded by Eugênio Sales
