= Archdiocese of Seoul =

Catholic archdiocese in Korea

Coordinates: 37.5633°N 126.9870°E

Metropolitan Archdiocese of Seoul Archidioecesis Metropolitae Seulensis 서울대교구
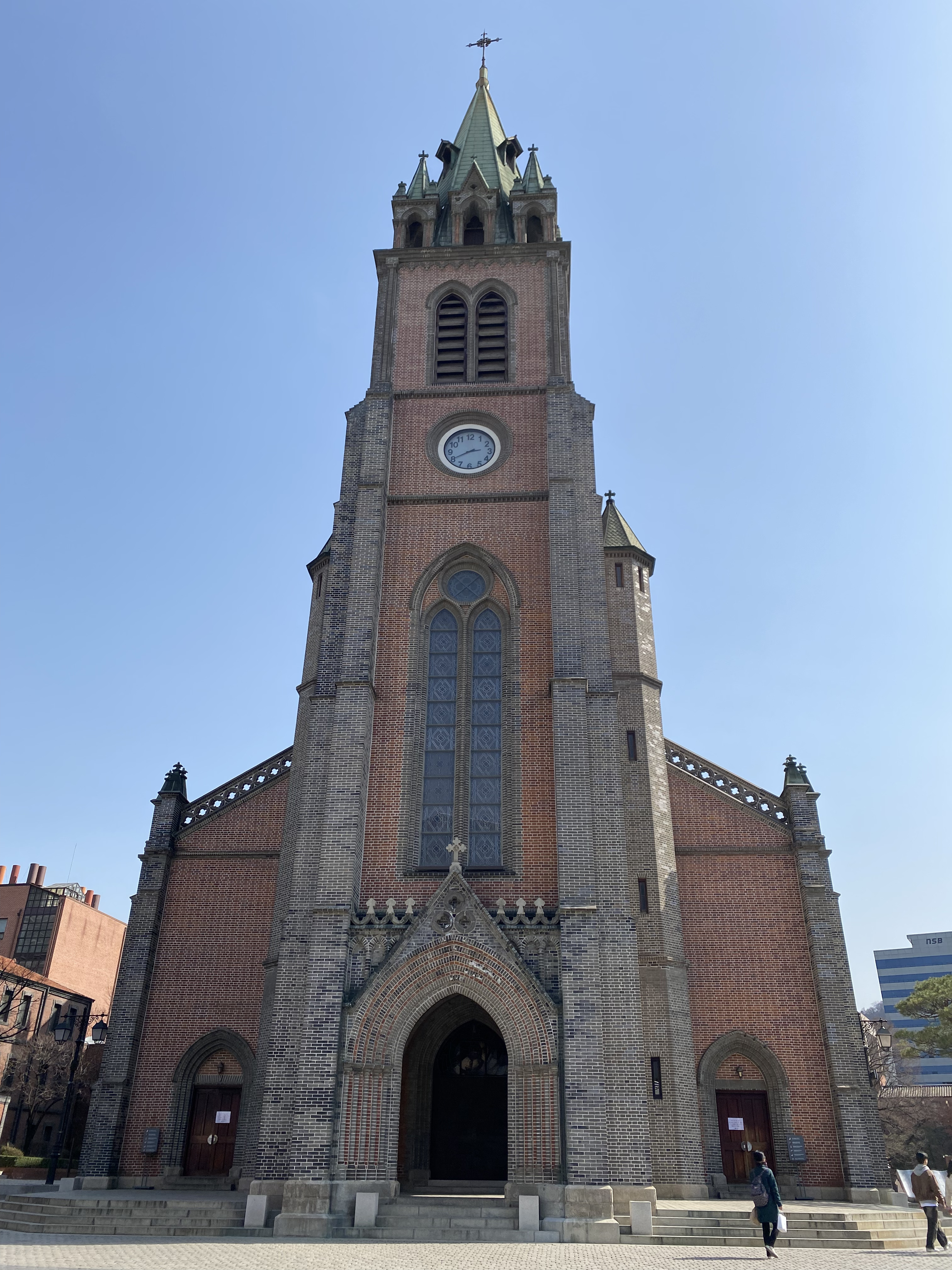
- Cathedral of the Virgin Mary of the Immaculate Conception (Mother church)

- Coat of arms

Location
- Country: South Korea
- Territory: Seoul and Hwanghae
- Ecclesiastical province: Seoul

Statistics
- Area: 17,349 km^{2} (6,698 sq mi)
- Population: Total; Catholics: (as of 2021); 9,765,869; 1,534,887 (15.7%)
- Parishes: 232

Information
- Denomination: Catholic
- Sui iuris church: Latin Church
- Rite: Roman Rite
- Established: 9 September 1831 (as Apostolic Vicariate); 10 March 1962 (as Archdiocese)
- Cathedral: Cathedral of the Blessed Virgin Mary of the Immaculate Conception in Seoul
- Patron saint: Blessed Virgin Mary
- Secular priests: 954

Current leadership
- Pope: Leo XIV
- Metropolitan Archbishop: Peter Chung Soon-taick
- Auxiliary Bishops: Matthew Choi Kwang-hee; Job Koo Yobi; Paul Lee Kyung-sang
- Bishops emeritus: Andrew Yeom Soo-jung

Map

Website
- aos.catholic.or.kr

The Metropolitan Archdiocese of Seoul (Latin: Archidioecesis Metropolitae Seulensis, Korean: 서울대교구) is a Metropolitan archdiocese of the Latin Church of the Catholic Church comprising the metropolitan area of Seoul, South Korea, whose province comprises parts of South Korea (which has two more provinces) and all North Korea, yet depends on the missionary Dicastery for Evangelization.

Its Metropolitan bishop as the Archbishop of Seoul resides at his Myeongdong Cathedral in Jung-gu, Seoul. The Archbishop of Seoul is also the Apostolic Administrator of the Diocese of Pyongyang in North Korea.

There are 57 secretly active Catholic parishes in North Korea, but due to the current regime in place, no Catholic priests are permitted permanent residency at the present time.

Pope Francis announced that the Archdiocese will be the host of the 2027 international celebration of World Youth Day.

== Statistics ==
As of 2020, it pastorally served 1,534,887 Catholics (15.7% of 9,765,869 total) on 17,349 km^{2} in 232 parishes with 954 priests.

== History ==
Pope Leo XIII was the first to approve the separation of the community from the control of diocese of Beijing and assigned priests from the Paris Foreign Missions Society but never went due to the Anti-Christian sentiment and persecutions during that time.

Pope Gregory XVI issued a papal bull, Ex debito pastoralis, on 9 September 1831, establishing the Apostolic Vicariate of the Korean Kingdom, 조선/Corea/Curiate(Italian)/朝鮮(正體中文), on territory split off from the then Diocese of Peking, in what used to be part of Imperial China. It was renamed on 8 April 1911 as the Apostolic Vicariate of Seoul 서울/漢城(正體中文), when it also ceded territory to establish the Apostolic Vicariate of Taiku (Daegu).

It lost more territories, beginning on 8 May 1920, to establish the Apostolic Vicariate of Wonsan. On 17 March 1927, it again ceded territory to establish the Apostolic Prefecture of Hpyeng-yang, and on 25 April 1939, it lost territory again to establish the Apostolic Prefecture of Shunsen.

The Apostolic Vicariate was again officially renamed on 12 July 1950 after its See as Apostolic Vicariate of Seul. It lost territories again on 23 June 1958 to establish the Apostolic Vicariate of Cheongju and the Apostolic Vicariate of Daijeon, and on 6 June 1961, it lost again to make the Apostolic Vicariate of Incheon, all three now have suffragan bishops.

The diocese was raised to the level of Metropolitan Archdiocese on 10 March 1962.

It lost again on 7 October 1963 to establish the Diocese of Suwon and it ceded territory again on 24 June 2004 to establish the Diocese of Uijeongbu, now both its suffragans.

The archdiocese has hosted official Papal visits by Pope John Paul II in May 1984 and October 1989 and by Pope Francis in August 2014.

== Museum ==
Seoul Archdiocesan Catholic History Museum
- 천주교 서울대교구 역사관
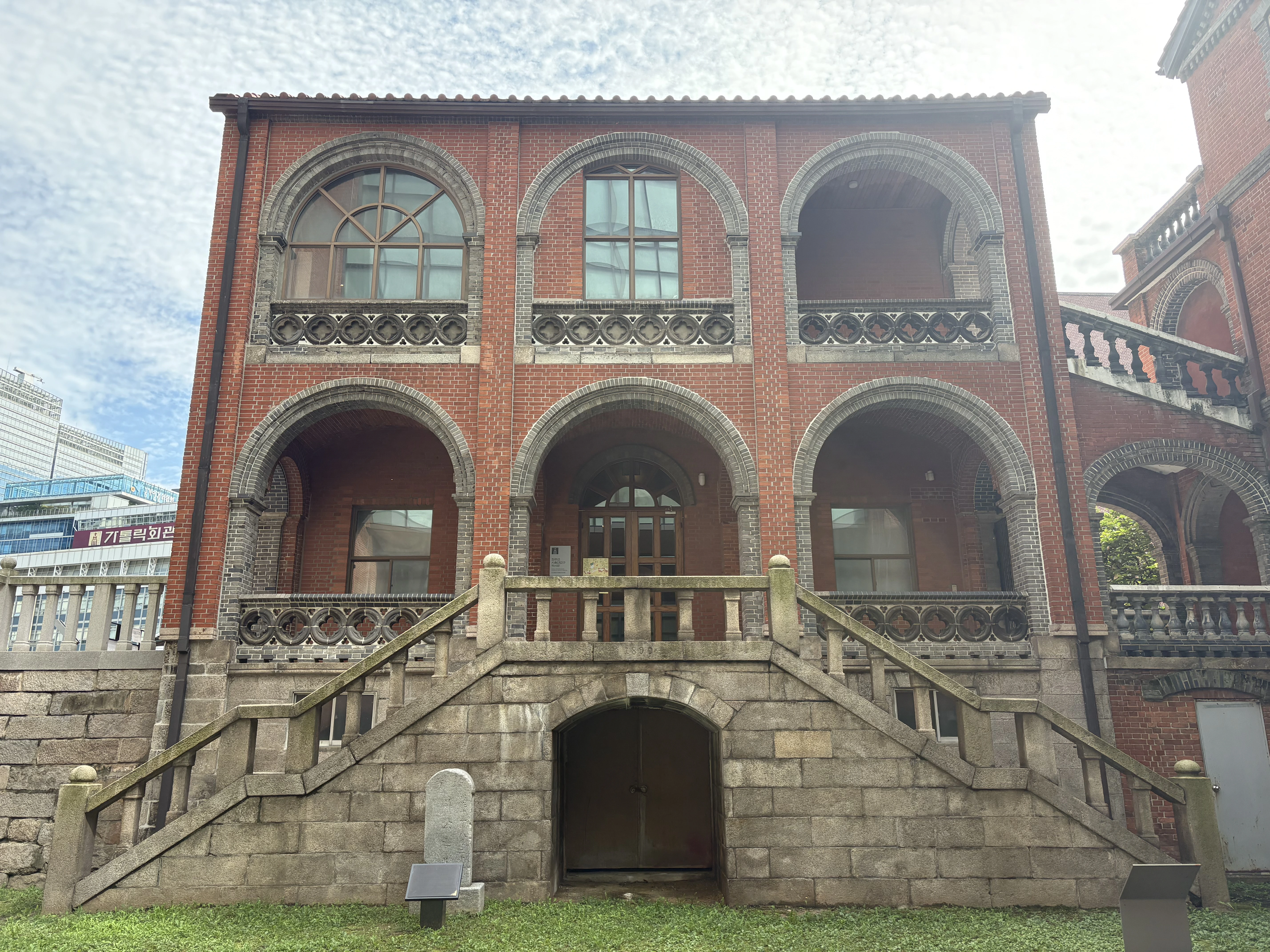
- Front view
- Established: June 25, 2018; 8 years ago
- Location: 74, Myeongdong-gil, Jung-gu, Seoul, South Korea
- Type: History museum
- Website: blog.naver.com/sachm

The Seoul Archdiocesan Catholic History Museum (Korean: 천주교 서울대교구 역사관) is a themed exhibition hall designed to provide an overview of the history of the Archdiocese of Seoul and Myeongdong Cathedral. It was the "Apostolic Building" which serves as the administrative office and management office of the Seoul Archdiocese.

=== Completion of the Building ===
==== Purchasing land near Jingogae Hill ====
Even after the Vicariate Apostolic of Corea was erected in 1831 and the first parish church(now Myeongdong Cathedral) was consecrated in 1882, bishops and priests failed to officially find a building where they could stay and work before the conclusion of the Corea-France Treaty of Commerce in 1886. After the agreement's signing, missionaries began to purchase land and houses near Chong-Hen Hill to build Official Bishops' Residence and Myeongdong Cathedral. Construction was launched the next year.

==== Completion of official bishops' residence cum accounting department building ====
Thanks to the efforts of Fathers Coste and Poisnel, Official Bishops' Residence, which also doubled as the building for the diocese's accounting department, was completed in 1890. Afterwards, work began on Chong-Hen(now Myeongdong) Cathedral and its consecration came in May 1898.

=== Apostolic Building ===
After Catholic Publishing House moved to an office building in Seoul's Jungnim-dong in 1979, the Official Bishops' Residence was briefly used by pastoral care organizations affiliated with the diocese, along with the Social Welfare Center. After undergoing renovation in 1980, it reopened as Education Hall under with the diocese's Education Department. This was when the space was renamed "Apostolic Building". The small assembly room could hold up to 100 people and the auditorium up to 300. These spaces were not only used for educational and cultural activities by the Catholic community, but also by non-Catholic social organizations.

== Ecclesiastical province ==
The Metropolitan's ecclesiastical province comprises his own Archdiocese and the following suffragan bishoprics, mostly in South Korea :

- Diocese of Chuncheon 춘천
- Diocese of Daejeon 대전
- Diocese of Hamhung 함흥 (in North Korea)
- Diocese of Incheon 인천
- Diocese of Pyongyang 평양 (in North Korea)
- Diocese of Suwon 수원
- Diocese of Uijeongbu 의정부
- Diocese of Wonju 원주

== Leadership ==
=== Ordinaries ===
==== Apostolic Vicars of Korea ====
- Barthélemy Bruguière, MEP (1831–1835)
- Saint Laurent-Joseph-Marius Imbert, MEP (1836–1839)
- Jean-Joseph-Jean-Baptiste Ferréol, MEP (1843–1853)
- Saint Siméon-François Berneux, MEP (1854–1866)
- Saint Antoine-Marie-Nicolas Daveluy, MEP (1866)
- Félix-Clair Ridel, MEP (1869–1884)
- Marie-Jean-Gustave Blanc, MEP (1884–1890)
- Gustave-Charles-Marie Mutel, MEP (1890–1911)

==== Apostolic Vicars of Seoul ====
- Gustave-Charles-Marie Mutel, MEP (1911–1933), appointed Archbishop (personal title) in 1926
- Adrien-Joseph Larribeau, MEP (1933–1942), appointed Apostolic Vicar and later Bishop of Daijeon
- Paul Roh Ki-nam (1942–1962)

==== Archbishops of Seoul ====
- Paul Roh Ki-nam (1962–1967)
- Victorinus Youn Kong-hi (1967–1968; apostolic administrator)
- Servant of God Cardinal Stephen Kim Sou-hwan (1968–1998)
- Cardinal Nicholas Cheong Jin-suk (1998–2012)
- Cardinal Andrew Yeom Soo-jung (2012–2021)
- Peter Chung Soon-taick, OCD (2021–present)

=== Coadjutor Bishops ===
- Jean-Joseph-Jean-Baptiste Ferréol, MEP (1838–1843)
- Saint Siméon-François Berneux, MEP (1844–1854)
- Saint Antoine-Marie-Nicolas Daveluy, MEP (1855–1866)
- Marie-Jean-Gustave Blanc, MEP (1877–1884)
- Émile-Alexandre-Joseph Devred, MEP (1920–1926), never succeeded to see
- Adrien-Joseph Larribeau, MEP (1926–1933)

=== Auxiliary Bishops ===
- Joseph Kyeong Kap-ryong (1977–1984), appointed Bishop of Daejeon
- Paul Kim Ok-kyun (1985–2001)
- Peter Kang U-il (1985–2002), appointed Bishop of Cheju
- Andreas Choi Chang-mou (1994–1999), appointed Coadjutor Archbishop and later Archbishop of Gwangju
- Joseph Lee Han-taek (2001–2004), appointed Bishop of Uijeongbu
- Andrew Yeom Soo-jung (2001–2012), appointed Archbishop of Seoul
- Lucas Kim Woon-hoe (2002–2010), appointed Bishop of Chunchon
- Basil Cho Kyu-man (2006–2016), appointed Bishop of Wonju
- Peter Chung Soon-taick, OCD (2014–2021), appointed Archbishop of Seoul
- Timothy Yu Gyoung-chon (2014–2025)
- Benedictus Son Hee-song (2015–2024), appointed Bishop of Uijeongbu
- Job Koo Yobi (2017–present)
- Paul Lee Kyung-sang (2024-present)

== See also ==
- List of Catholic Dioceses in Korea
- Seoul Archdiocesan Catholic History Museum

== Sources and external links ==
- (in Korean and English) Official website
- GCatholic.org, with Google map – data for all sections
- English Mass Service in Seoul
  - Myeongdong Cathedral English Mass Service
  - Yeoksam Catholic Church English Mass Service
  - Seoul International Catholic Church
