= Catholic Church in Korea =

Catholic hierarchy in Korea.

The Catholic Church in Korea is part of the worldwide Catholic Church, under the spiritual leadership of the Bishop of Rome (the Pope).

The Catholic Church in Korea originated from contact with the Western world. Trade and the exchange of ideas, primarily beginning in the 18th century, between the Korean peninsula and Europe resulted in the proliferation of books on Catholic teachings, and the spread of Western knowledge. The Catholic Church faced severe persecution under the Joseon Dynasty due to the threat that this newly introduced faith posed against the Confucian-based social and political order. Many major events contributed to the spread of the Catholicism in Korea. The history of Korea following its introduction also had a significant impact upon how it spread, between that of the north and the south, and how these differences still resonate in the modern-day.

The Catholic hierarchy in Korea has never been divided between the South and North, in the same manner as the Catholic hierarchy in Germany was never divided between East and West between the artificially created borders. For example, some parts of the territory of the archdiocese of Seoul are located in North Korea. Nevertheless, since the political division of Korea in 1945, Catholicism has had a different development in North and South Korea.

== North Korea ==
North Korea is officially an atheist state and does not have diplomatic relations with the Holy See. The Catholic hierarchy has been inactive there for decades (i.e. since the Korean War), and there are no active Catholic churches in the country.

The only territorial abbey outside of Europe and one of only 11 remaining territorial abbeys is the Territorial Abbey of Tokwon, located near Wonsan in North Korea. The persecution of Christians in North Korea since 1949 has made any activity in the abbacy impossible. However, the Territorial Abbacy of Tokwon is formally still kept as one of the few remaining territorial abbeys within the Catholic Church.

== South Korea ==
About 11% of the population of South Korea (roughly 5.8 million) are Catholics, with about 1,734 parishes and 5,360 priests as of 2017. By proportion of a national population and by raw number of adherents, South Korea ranks among the most strongly Catholic countries in Asia after the Philippines and East Timor.

== History ==
Notable numbers of Europeans first established disparate contact with Eastern Asia in the 16th century. Catholic missionaries in China gave to Korean officials and ambassadors a variety of literature and other items, including an early world atlas, Christian scriptures, and scientific writings; these officials brought with them to Korea these gifts, and exposed the Korean court for the first time to Christian ideas.

In the late 18th century, a small group of Korean intellectuals and scholars (known as silhak) were exposed to Catholicism through Western books and Chinese translations. The growing influx of Western knowledge into Korea facilitated these early encounters with Catholic teachings. As a result, some scholars began to embrace the new faith and lay the groundwork for establishing Catholicism in Korea. These scholars converted prior to the arrival of Catholic missionaries to the country, and relied upon the fragments of Christian literature they already possessed to guide them during this time. The pivotal event in the early development of the Church in Korea occurred when Yi Seung-hun, a Korean diplomat, traveled to Beijing in 1784. During his stay, he encountered Catholicism for the first time, and was baptized, taking the name Peter. Upon returning to Korea, he brought back Catholic books and religious materials, which he shared with friends and associates. This marked the beginning of a small, albeit significant, Catholic community in Korea.

=== Persecution of Catholics before 1866 ===
In the decades that followed the introduction of Catholicism to Korea, the Catholic Church faced severe persecution under the Joseon Dynasty. The primary reason for this persecution was the perceived threat of Catholic teachings to the existing Confucian-based social and political order. The Catholic faith, emphasizing loyalty to God above earthly authorities, was seen as subversive, potentially destabilizing the established hierarchy. The first official record of persecution against Catholics dates back to 1801 when Siméon-François Berneux, a French Catholic priest, was arrested and expelled from the country. Over the years, the number of converts and the intensity of the persecution grew. The government issued several edicts banning Catholicism and subjected known adherents to torture and execution. Despite the risks, the Catholic community grew clandestinely, and many Korean Catholics died as martyrs for their faith during this period.

One of the most critical events that significantly affected the spread of the Catholic Church in Korea was the Catholic Persecution of 1866, also known as the Byeongin Persecution. Fears of foreign intervention triggered this persecution, as Catholicism was associated with Western countries, particularly France. The prevailing anti-foreign sentiment further fueled the hostility towards Catholics, making them easy targets of persecution. The Byeongin Persecution was characterized by widespread violence and brutal suppression of the Catholic community. Thousands of Korean Catholics, including clergy and laity, were killed during this period. Among the notable figures who suffered martyrdom during the persecution were French bishop Siméon-François Berneux and Korean lay leader Paul Yun Ji-Chung. Despite the immense challenges faced by the Catholic Church during this time, the persecution did not crush the faith of Korean Catholics. Instead, it further strengthened their resolve, and the sacrifice of the martyrs became a source of inspiration for future generations of believers.

== See also ==
- Catholic Bishops' Conference of Korea
- Christianity in Korea
- Catholic Church in China
