= Andreas Choi Chang-mou =

South Korean Catholic priest (born 1936)

- Archbishop of Gwangju
- Church: Catholic Church
- Archdiocese: Archdiocese of Gwangju
- In office: 30 November 2000 – 25 March 2010
- Predecessor: Victorinus Youn Kong-hi
- Successor: Hyginus Kim Hee-jong
- Previous posts: Coadjutor Archbishop of Gwangju (1999-2000); Titular Bishop of Flumenpiscense (1994-1999); Auxiliary Bishop of Seoul (1994-1999)

Orders
- Ordination: 9 June 1963
- Consecration: 25 March 1994 by Stephen Kim Sou-hwan

Personal details
- Born: 15 September 1936 (age 89) Munsa-an-ni, Keiki Province, Chōsen, Empire of Japan

Korean name
- Hangul: 최창무
- Hanja: 崔昌武
- RR: Choe Changmu
- MR: Ch'oe Ch'angmu

Andreas Choi Chang-mou is the fourth Archbishop of Gwangju. Born in Paju, Keiki Province, Korea, Empire of Japan in 1936, he was ordained a priest of the Archdiocese of Seoul on June 9, 1963.

On February 3, 1994, he was appointed Auxiliary Bishop of Seoul and Titular Bishop of Flumenpiscense. On February 9, 1999, he was appointed Coadjutor Archbishop of Gwangju and succeeded Archbishop Victorinus Youn Kong-hi upon the latter's retirement on November 11, 2000.

Catholic Church titles
Preceded by Salvador Albert Schlaefer Berg	— TITULAR — Titular Bishop of Flumenpiscense; 3 February 1994 – 9 February 1999	Succeeded by Odilon Guimarães Moreira
Preceded by Victorinus Youn Kong-hi	Archbishop of Gwangju; 30 November 2000 – 25 March 2010	Succeeded by Hyginus Kim Hee-jong
