= Roman Catholic Diocese of Suwon =

Roman Catholic diocese in South Korea

Coordinates: 37.2833°N 127.0170°E

Diocese of Suwon Dioecesis Suvonensis 수원 교구

Location
- Country: South Korea
- Territory: Southern part of Gyeonggi
- Ecclesiastical province: Seoul
- Metropolitan: Seoul

Statistics
- Area: 5,371 km^{2} (2,074 sq mi)
- Population: Total; Catholics: (as of 2017); 8,417,575; 928,650 (10.9%)
- Parishes: 218

Information
- Denomination: Catholic
- Sui iuris church: Latin Church
- Rite: Roman Rite
- Established: 7 October 1963 (61 years ago)
- Cathedral: Cathedral of St Joseph
- Patron saint: Queen of Peace

Current leadership
- Pope: Francis
- Bishop: Matthias Ri Iong-hoon
- Metropolitan Archbishop: Peter Chung Soon-taick
- Auxiliary Bishops: John Moon Hee-jong
- Bishops emeritus: Paul Choi Deok-ki

Map

Website
- casuwon.or.kr

The Diocese of Suwon (Lat.: Dioecesis Suvonensis) is a particular church of the Latin Church of the Catholic Church. The seat of the Bishop of Suwon is at Jeongjadong Cathedral in Suwon, Gyeonggi-do, South Korea.

Pope Paul VI created the episcopal see on October 7, 1963. The territory had previously been part of the Archdiocese of Seoul, to which Suwon is suffragan.

== Leadership ==
=== Ordinaries ===
- Victorinus Youn Kong-hi (1963–1973), appointed Archbishop of Gwangju
- Angelo Kim Nam-su (1974–1997)
- Paul Choi Deok-ki (1997–2009)
- Matthias Ri Iong-hoon (2009–present)

=== Coadjutor Bishops ===
- Paul Choi Deok-ki (1996–1997)
- Matthias Ri Iong-hoon (2008–2009)

=== Auxiliary Bishops ===
- Matthias Ri Iong-hoon (2003–2008)
- Linus Lee Seong-hyo (2011–2024), appointed Bishop of Masan
- John Moon Hee-jong (2015–present)
