= Myeongdong Cathedral =

Catholic cathedral in Seoul, South Korea

Myeongdong Cathedral The Cathedral of Our Lady of the Immaculate Conception 천주교 서울대교구 주교좌 명동대성당
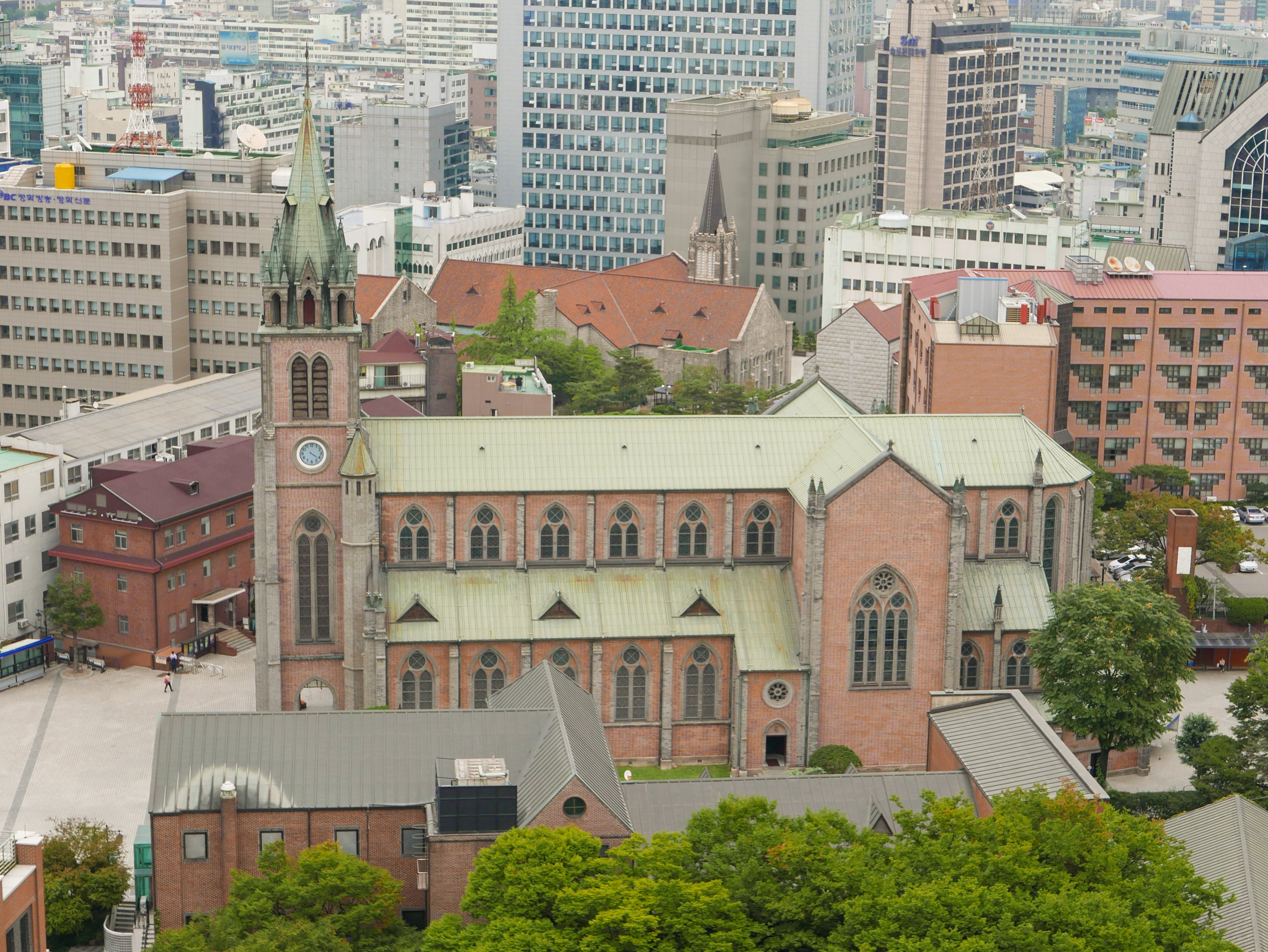

Religion
- Affiliation: Catholic Church
- Diocese: Archdiocese of Seoul
- Ecclesiastical or organisational status: Cathedral

Location
- Location: Seoul, South Korea
- Interactive map of Myeongdong Cathedral; The Cathedral of Our Lady of the Immaculate Conception 천주교 서울대교구 주교좌 명동대성당
- Coordinates: 37°33′48″N 126°59′14″E

Architecture
- Type: Church
- Style: Gothic Revival
- Groundbreaking: 1892
- Completed: 1898
- Historic Sites of South Korea
- Designated: 22 November 1977
- Reference no.: 258

Korean name
- Hangul: 천주교 서울대교구 주교좌 명동대성당
- Revised Romanization: Cheonjugyo seouldaegyogu jugyojwa myeongdongdaeseongdang
- McCune–Reischauer: Ch'ŏnjugyo sŏultaegyogu chugyojwa myŏngdongdaesŏngdang

Myeongdong Cathedral
- Hangul: 명동대성당
- Hanja: 明洞大聖堂
- Revised Romanization: Myeongdong Daeseongdang
- McCune–Reischauer: Myŏngdong Taesŏngdang

The Cathedral Church of Our Lady of the Immaculate Conception (Latin: Ecclesia Cathedralis Nostrae Dominae Immaculatae Conceptionis; Korean: 천주교 서울대교구 주교좌 명동대성당), informally known as Myeongdong Cathedral (명동대성당), is the national cathedral of the Archdiocese of Seoul. Located in the Myeongdong neighbourhood of Jung District, Seoul, South Korea, it is the seat of the Archbishop of Seoul, Peter Chung Soon-taick.

The shrine is dedicated to the Blessed Virgin Mary as the Immaculate Conception honored as the principal Patroness of Korea by a pontifical decree accorded by Pope Gregory XVI in 1841. The cathedral serves as a community landmark, tourist attraction, and a notable symbol of Catholic Church in Korea. The South Korean government declared the cathedral as a historic site (No. # 258) on 22 November 1977.

== History ==
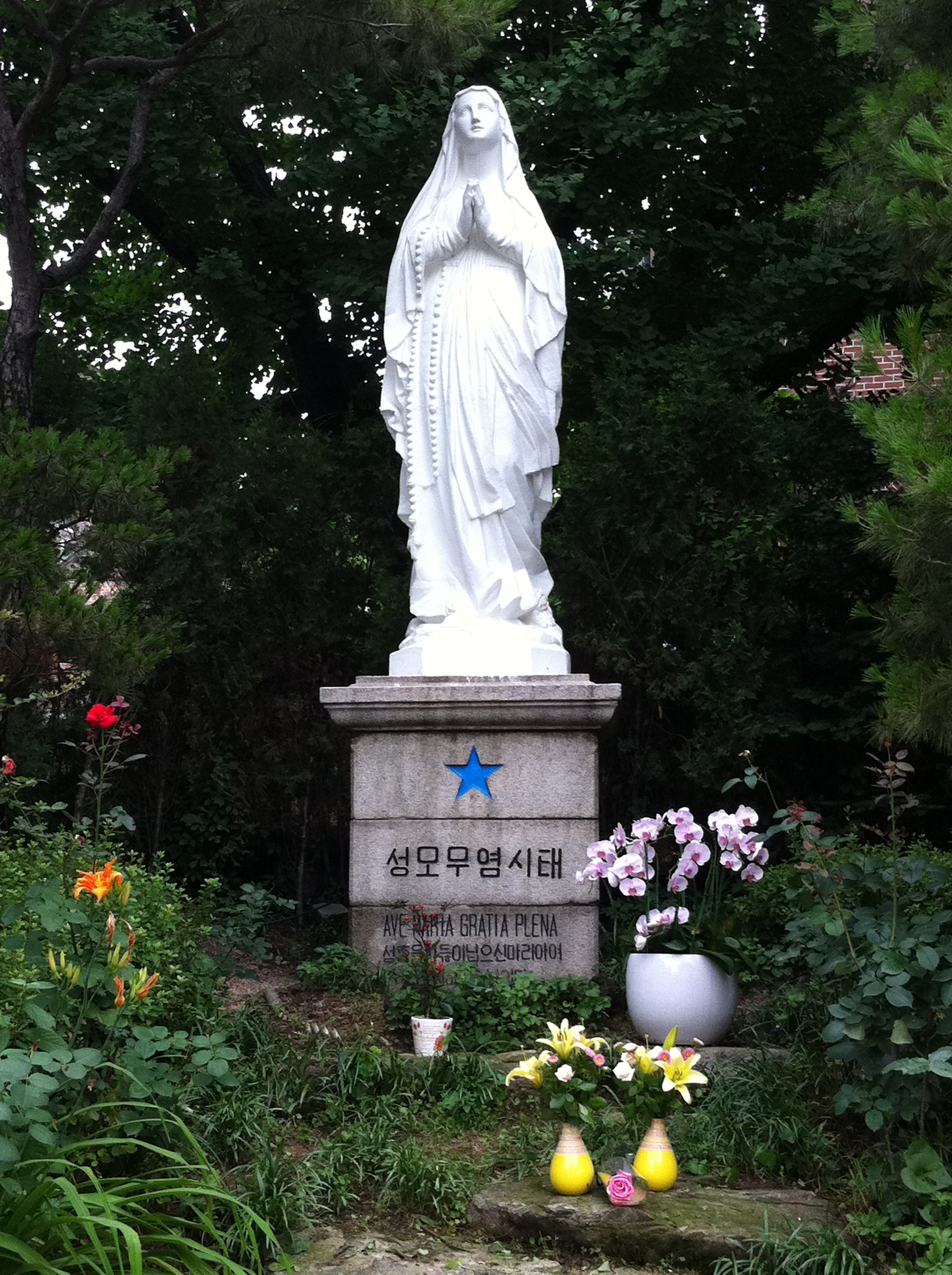
A 1948 French image of Our Lady of the Immaculate Conception at the cathedral.

Christianity was heavily persecuted during the Joseon period. Still, interest in it grew as an academic novelty, notably among members of the Silhak (실학; "practical learning") school, attracted to what they saw as its egalitarian values. Catholicism gained ground as a belief in the 19th century through the work of French missionaries, the persecutions of whom led to an 1866 French punitive expedition.

After the Joseon dynasty concluded a commercial treaty with United States in 1882, Marie-Jean-Gustave Blanc, M.E.P., Apostolic Vicar of Korea, sought land to build a mission. Under the name Kim Gamilo, he acquired a vacant lot on Jonghyeon (Chong-Hyen), meaning "Bell Hill"; due to its proximity to a Confucian temple, Koreans had declined to build there. A school was constructed, and plans to build a church placed under the supervision of French priest Eugène Jean George Coste at the end of the diplomatic trade treaty between Korea and France in 1887. At this site, the first Joseon diocese was erected and a building was constructed to grow seminarians by approximately 60 rooms, which was presented to Pope Leo XIII to convince him to separate the territory from the Diocese of Beijing.

At first, Emperor Gojong of Korea opposed the construction of the cathedral and threatened to confiscate the land in 1887. On 28 April 1888, he tasked the trade minister Byong-Sik Cho to press the American, Russian and Italian governments to stop funding the cathedral, and the Korean government placed a decree of restriction against the circulation of gold currency, in an attempt to slow construction. Accounts say Gojong supported this move, partly due to his disdain that a building was built higher than his palace.

Nevertheless, he eventually became convinced of the value of having a Christian cathedral, and conceded to hold the cornerstone ceremony on 5 August 1892. Construction cost approximately US$60,000, supported by the Paris Foreign Missions Society. Because of the First Sino-Japanese War, however, and the subsequent death of substitute Bishop Eugène Jean George Coste, the inauguration of the cathedral was postponed for several years. On 29 May 1898, it was finally dedicated and consecrated to the Immaculate Conception of the Blessed Virgin and was inaugurated as the Jong-Hyun Cathedral. At its construction, it was the largest building in Seoul.

In 1900, the relics of the Korean Martyrs who died in the 1866 persecution were moved to its crypt from the seminary in Yongsan District. In 1924, a pipe organ was installed at the church but due to the famine of the Korean War was looted and later destroyed.

On 22 November 1977, the Korean government assigned the cathedral as Historic Site No. 258, identifying it as a prime cultural property and asset of the country.

The Catholic clergy were among the leading critics of South Korea's military rule in the 1970s and 1980s, and Myeongdong Cathedral became a center of Minjung political and labor protest as well as a sanctuary for the protesters; indeed, it was nicknamed the "Mecca" of pro-democracy activists. Catholic and future President Kim Dae-jung held a rally at the cathedral in 1976 to demand the resignation of President Park Chung Hee, and some 600 student-led protesters staged a hunger strike inside in 1987 after the torture and death of university student Park Jong-chol.

The cathedral remains a popular spot for protesters, due to the government's previous disinclination to arrest protesters inside church property. In 2000, the cathedral attempted to officially ban protesters who did not have prior approval after a protest of telecommunications labor unions beat female churchgoers and vandalized church property.

The cathedral offers Catholic Mass for foreigners on Sunday mornings, while the rest of its services are in Korean.

== National patronage ==
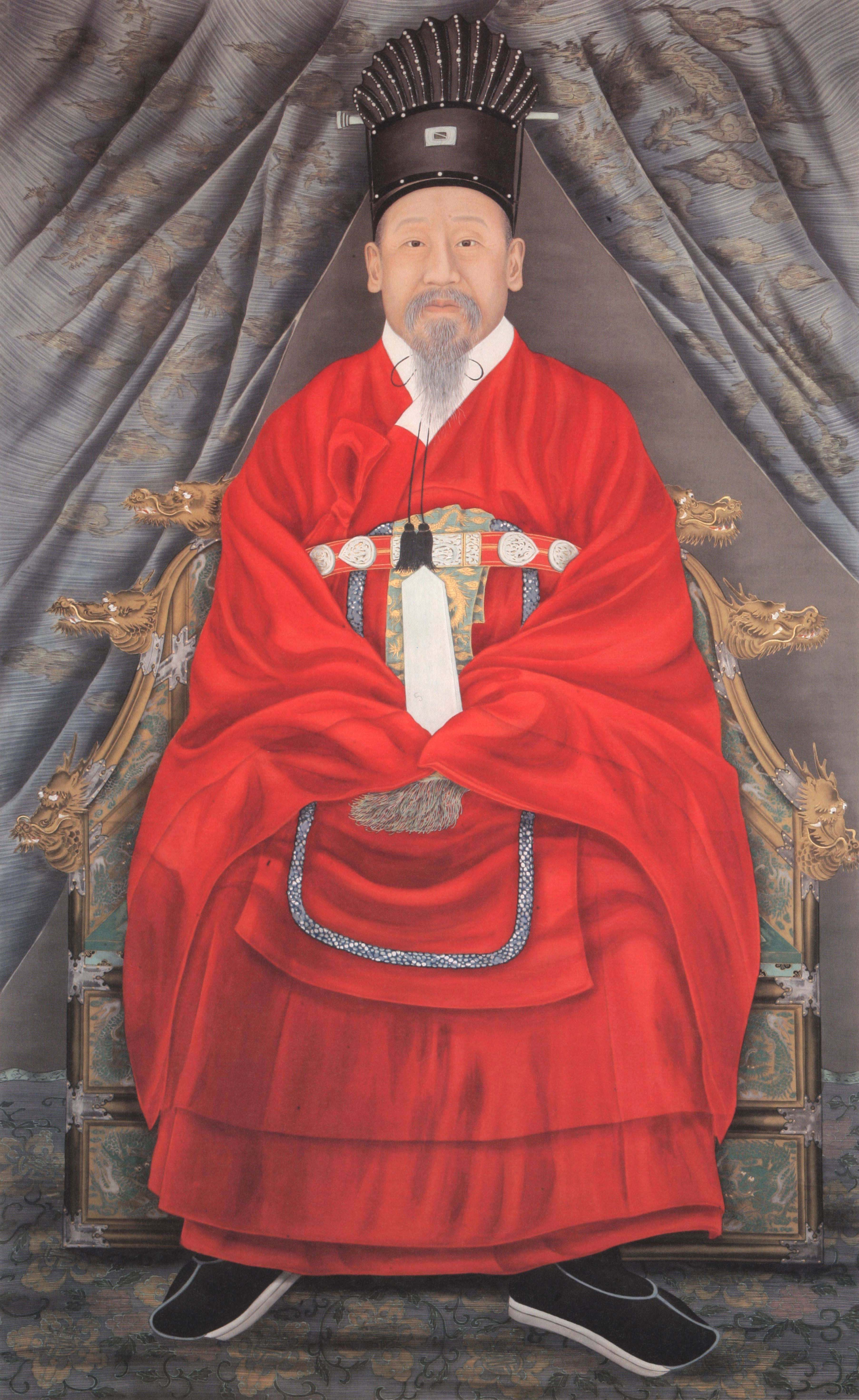
The first emperor of Korea, Gojong of Joseon, laid down the cathedral's cornerstone on 5 August 1892, after years of opposing its construction due to the higher rooftop versus the imperial palace.

Amidst Korean suspicion and persecution of Christianity at the time, the provincial church of Korea was originally a part of the Diocese of Beijing, China. Lay member Hasang Cheong (Baptismal name: Paul) petitioned the Bishop of Beijing nine times without success before being sent to Monsignor Raphael Umpierres of Macao, who then fully formalized the petition in the Latin language in 1826, asking Pope Leo XII to separate the community from the control of diocese of Beijing. The pontiff approved the request and assigned the Paris Foreign Missions Society but were hesitant due to the strong Anti-Christian sentiment in Korea at the time. Eventually, the Rosary Pope passed away and Cardinal Bartholomew Cappellari, who was prefect of the Sacred Congregation for the Propagation of the Faith then succeeded as Pope Gregory XVI.

- On 9 September 1831, Pope Gregory XVI issued a papal bull "In Frater Salutem" establishing the first Apostolic Vicariate in Seoul, Korea as a separate territory from Diocese of Beijing. The Pontifical decree was signed and executed by Cardinal Tommaso Bernetti. The community initially survived without the help of foreign Catholic priests, who were unable to come due to anti-Catholic persecutions earlier that year. On 22 August 1841, the same Pontiff solemnly dedicated the Catholic Church in Korea, (already as a separate territory to Beijing), to the Blessed Virgin Mary under the Marian title "The Immaculate Virgin".
- On 6 May 1984, Pope John Paul II reaffirmed the Blessed Virgin as the patroness of the cathedral and South Korea. In his 1984 Apostolic Letter, Pope John Paul II noted that Bishop Imbert (Embert) Bum first consecrated Korea to the Immaculate Conception in 1837, followed by French Bishop Jean Joseph Ferréol in 1846 along with Saint Joseph as its co-patron. According to the papal brief, a similar re-dedication of patronage to the Immaculate Conception was invoked on by the French Bishop Gustave Charles Mutel (1854–1933) on 29 May 1898.
- On 18 August 2014, Pope Francis presided over the Holy Mass at the cathedral, attended by former Korean President Park Geun Hye and seven comfort women who had survived during the Japanese occupation of Korea.

== Building details ==
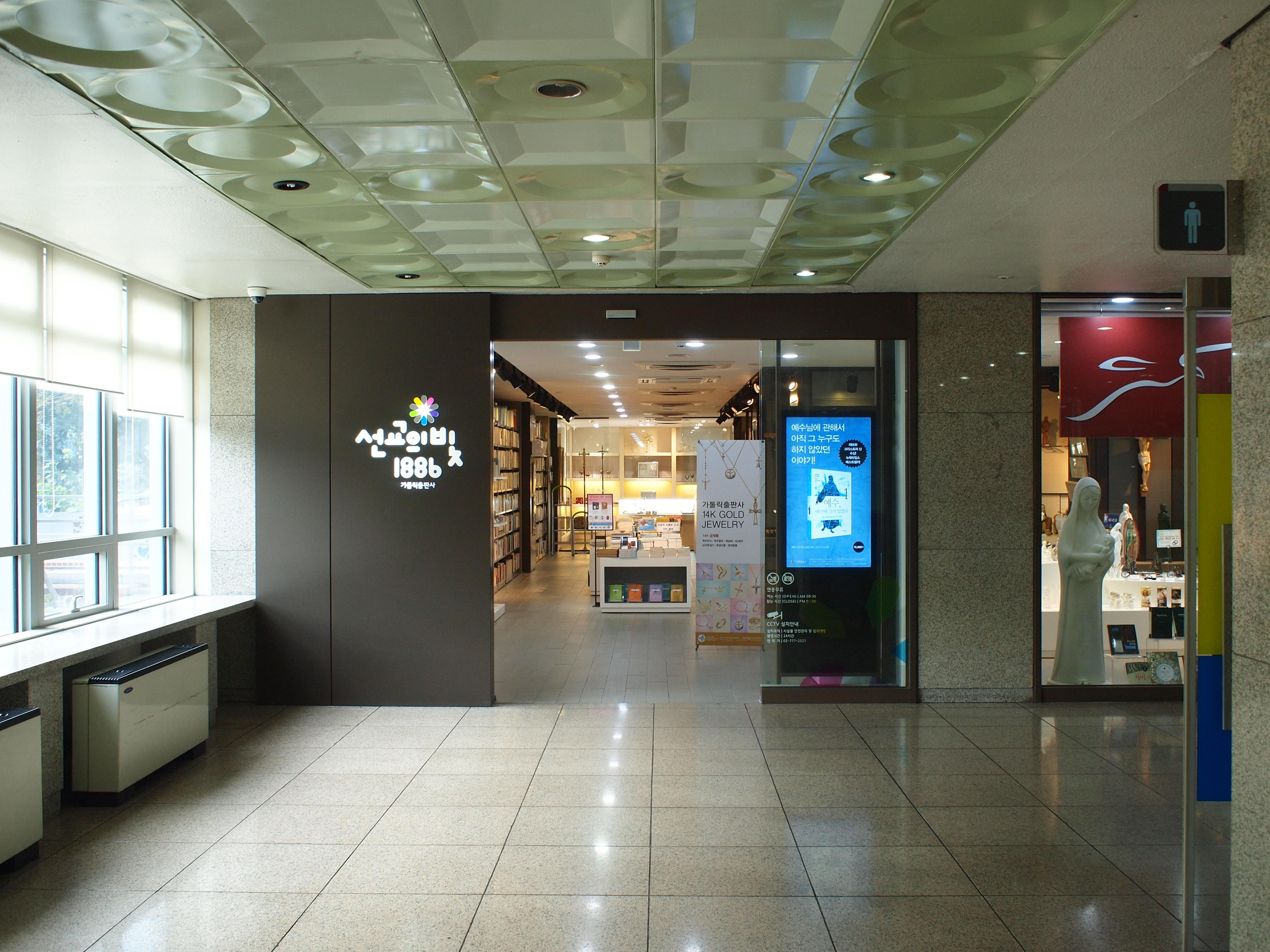
Since its early days, the cathedral has always boasted its own Catholic publishing company, with its original storefront founded in 1886, which today also caters to Korean tourism.

The original church was constructed with twenty types of locally fired red and gray bricks. The main building rises to 23 m (75 ft) high, with the nave being the same height, while the steeple, which contains a clock, rises to 45 m (148 ft). It was designated National Historic Site no.258 on 22 November 1977.

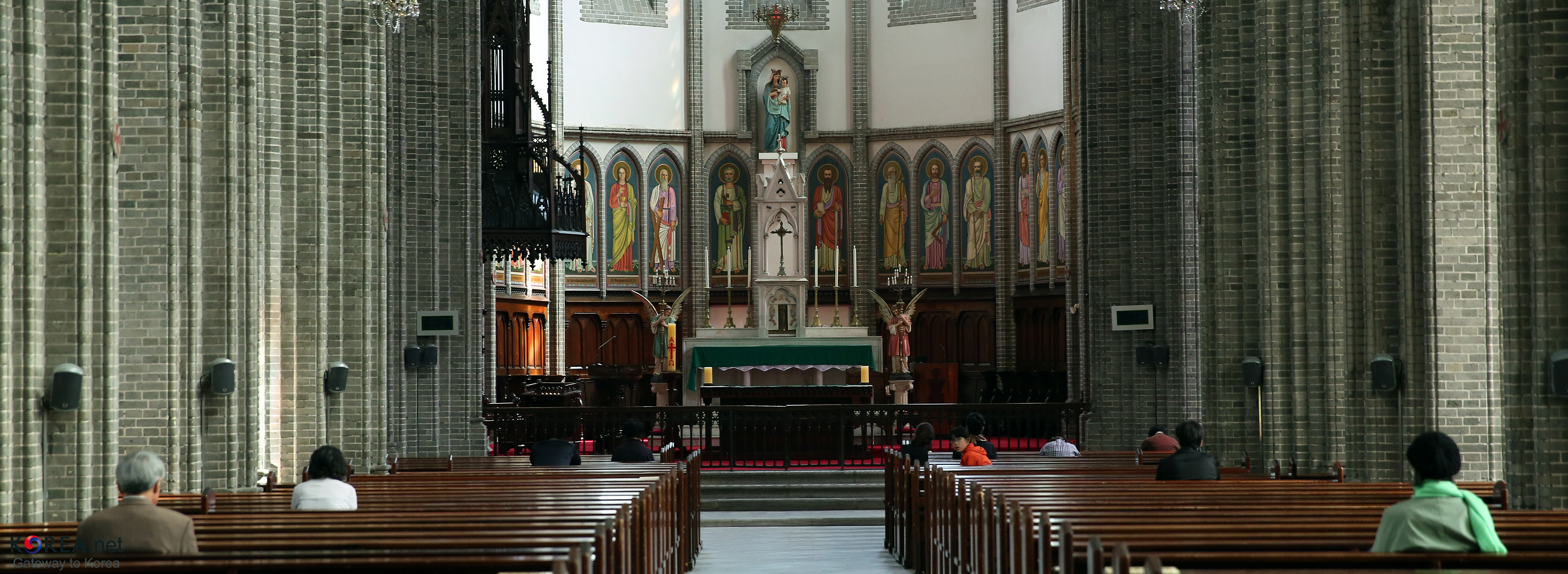
The interior of the altar, where a modern image of the Our Lady of the Sacred Heart is enshrined.

The interior of the church is ornately decorated with religious artwork. The high altar of the cathedral features a modernized statue of Our Lady of the Sacred Heart. The image is flanked by a central ciborium enshrining a cross that is flanked by the Twelve apostles. A side altar is dedicated to Saint Benedict of Nursia while another side chapel features patron saint Andrew Kim Taegon and French Bishop Bum-Se-Hyeong, born as Laurent-Joseph-Marius Imbert, whom local devotees have dressed in the national costume of Korea. Stained glass windows depict the Nativity of Jesus and Adoration of the Magi, Jesus with the Twelve Apostles, and the Fifteen Mysteries of the Rosary. The windows were restored to their original condition in 1982 by artist Lee Nam-gyu.

The crypt of the cathedral lies directly beneath the main altar. The crypt contains the relics of nine Korean Church martyrs. Two of the martyrs' identities are unknown. The remaining five are Bishop Laurent-Joseph-Marius Imbert (the second Bishop of the Church in Korea), Father Maubant, Father Chastan Kim Sung-woo Antonio, and Choi Gunghwan Francesco. A special pilgrimage Holy Mass takes place every weekday morning in the Crypt Chapel.

On the 50th anniversary of the consecration of the church in 1948, a French statue of Our Lady of Lourdes bearing the title "the Immaculate Conception" was erected behind the church property. On 27 August 1960, Archbishop Paul Roh Ki-nam consecrated the grotto and dedicated it towards Korean reunification, at the time a highly controversial issue that persists on today.

== Mass times ==
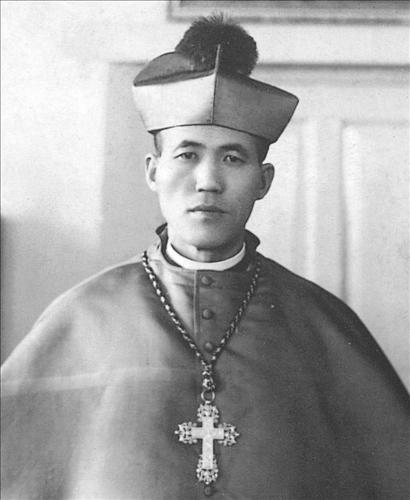
On 27 November 1960, Archbishop Paul Roh Ki-nam caused wide controversy when he consecrated the grotto image of the shrine towards the possible Reunification of Korea, a political issue that is still debated today.

- Tuesday 7:00 PM — The plenary indulgence of the Archbishop of Seoul towards the Reunification of Korea (offered weekly since 1997).
- Weekend Mass

Venue	Time slot				
Main Chapel (Morning)	07:00	09:00	10:00	11:00	12:00
Main Chapel (Afternoon)	16:00	17:00	18:00	19:00 (Children)	21:00
Sub Chapel	09:00 (College Students)		11:00 (Handicapped)		
Sabbatine Privilege	18:00	19:00			
Foreigners' Mass (English language) (Sunday only)	07:00 AM; 09:00 AM				

== Former titles of the cathedral ==
- The church was originally called the Jonghyeon Cathedral (종현성당; 鐘峴聖堂) during the time of Emperor Gojong of Korea.
- During the Japanese occupation, its formal title was lost and was simply called The Catholic Church (천주교회; 天主敎會)
- After the liberation Korea from colonial rule in 1945, its formal name was later changed to the Cathedral Church of the Virgin Mary of the Immaculate Conception and was colloquially referred to by its congregants as the Myeongdong Cathedral.
