= Catholic University of Korea =

Private Roman Catholic university in Bucheon-si, Gyeonggi-do, South Korea

The Catholic University of Korea
- 가톨릭대학교
- Motto: 진리, 사랑, 봉사
- Motto in English: Love, Truth, Service
- Type: Private
- Established: 1855; 171 years ago
- Affiliations: Roman Catholic
- President: Michael Choi Jun Gui (최준규)
- Faculty: 1,005
- Administrative staff: 289
- Students: 11,013
- Undergraduates: 8,443
- Postgraduates: 2,570
- Location: Bucheon, Gyeonggi-do, South Korea; 37.58590°N 127.00433°E (Songsin Campus)
- Campus: Songsin Campus (Seoul); Songeui Campus (Seoul); Songsim Campus (Bucheon, Gyeonggi Province)
- Colors: CUK Blue; CUK Gray
- Mascot: Dove
- Website: www.catholic.ac.kr

Korean name
- Hangul: 가톨릭대학교
- Hanja: 天主敎大學校
- Revised Romanization: Gatollik Daehakgyo
- McCune–Reischauer: Kat'ollik Taehakkyo

The Catholic University of Korea (Korean: 가톨릭대학교; RR: Gatollik Daehakgyo) is a private Roman Catholic university in Bucheon, Gyeonggi Province, South Korea. It was established in 1855. The Catholic University of Korea operates campuses in Seoul and in the neighboring Bucheon. The university's college of medicine operates eight affiliated hospitals throughout the country.

The Catholic University of Korea offers bachelor's degrees, master's degrees, and doctoral degrees in Catholic theology, humanities, social sciences, natural sciences, medicine, and engineering.

== History ==
The university traces its roots to St. Joseph's Seminary in Baeron, a Catholic refuge in modern-day Jecheon, North Chungcheong Province. It was founded in 1855 before Christianity was legalized. After the legalization of Christianity, the school moved to Yongsan District, Seoul, in 1887, and was renamed Seminary of Sacred Heart of Jesus. A hospital associated with the seminary was opened in 1936. The seminary became Songsin College in 1947 and the medical school was established in 1954. The name was later changed to Catholic College. Songsim Women's College (Songsim, or 聖心, means 'Sacred Heart' in Korean) was founded in 1964; the two colleges were merged in 1995 to form the present-day entity of Catholic University.

== Campuses ==
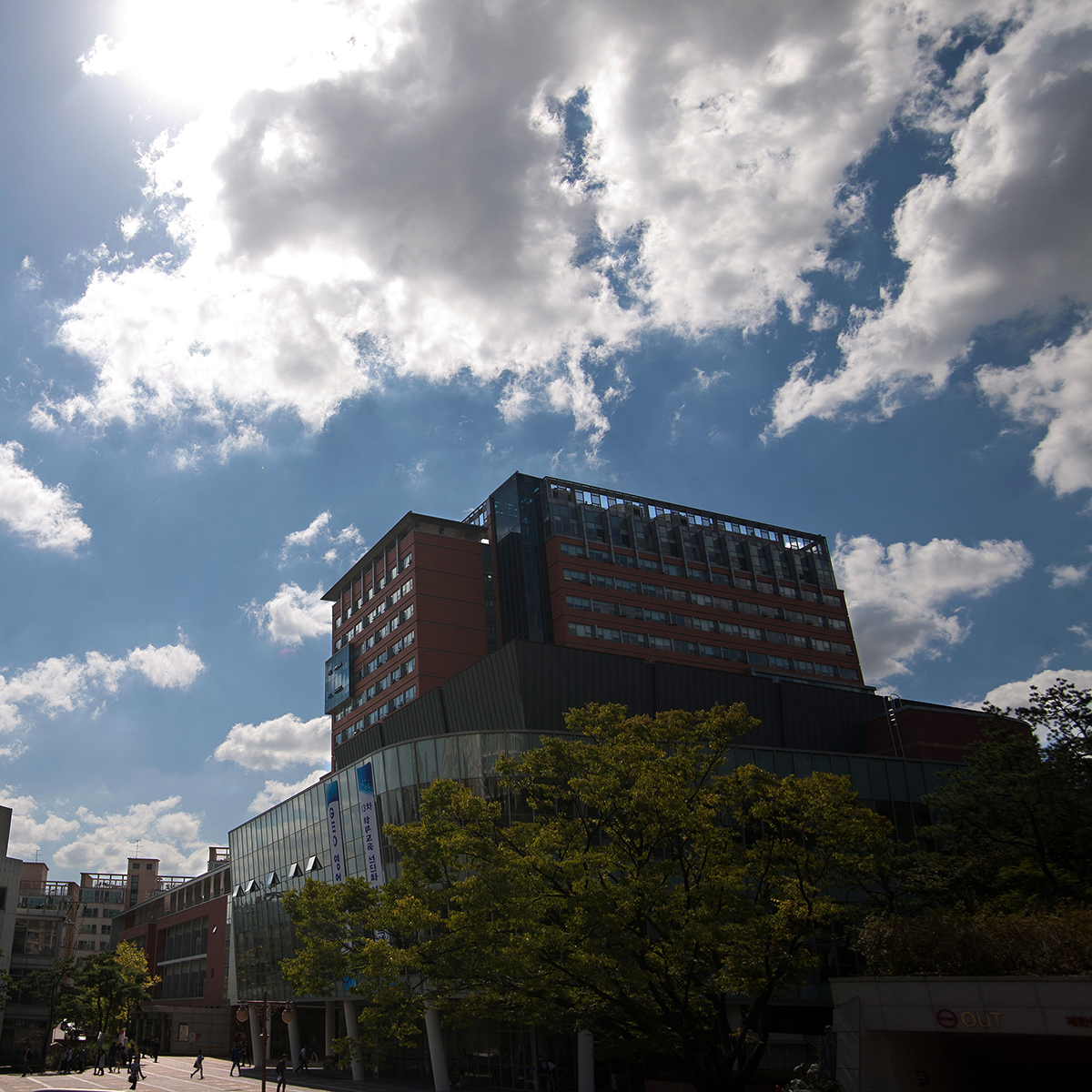
Cardinal Kim Sou-hwan International Hall in Songsim Campus

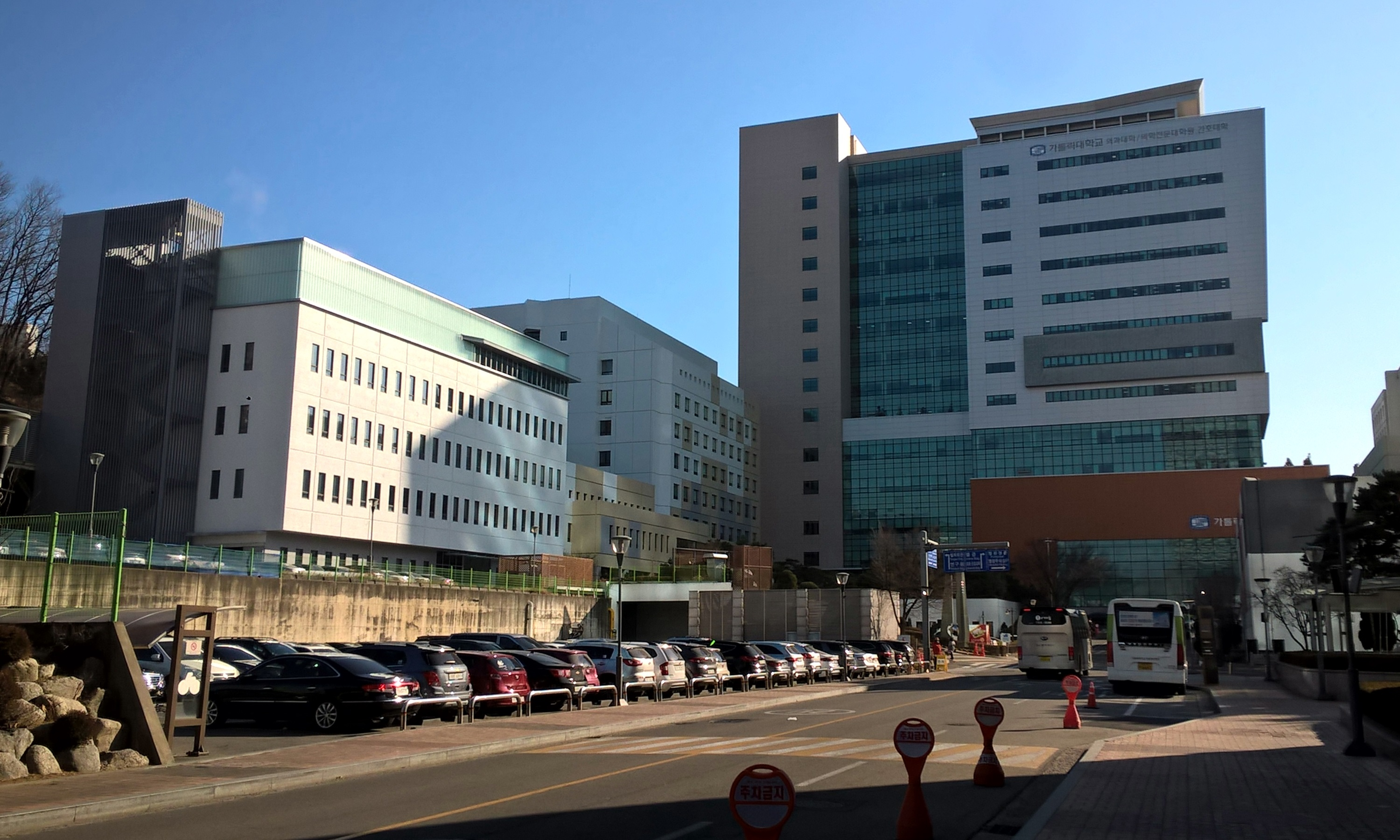
Medical and Biomedical Research Institute in Songui Campus

The Catholic University of Korea has three campuses in the Seoul Capital Area. The theology department is based at the Songsin Theological Campus in Hyehwa-dong, central Seoul, while the medical and nursing colleges are located at the Songeui Medical Campus in Banpo-dong, Seoul. The remaining departments are situated at the Songsim Global Campus in Bucheon, Gyeonggi-do.

=== Songeui Campus ===
==== Seoul St. Mary's Hospital ====
Seoul St. Mary's Hospital is one of the affiliated hospitals of the Catholic University of Korea and is part of the CMC (Catholic Medical Center) network. The new hospital opened on 30 April 2009 on the campus of the Catholic University of Korea; it has 1,355 beds, including Intensive care unit (ICU) 110 beds. Sun Myung Moon was admitted there and died there in 2012.

== Academics ==
The university has a policy of "inbound globalization", requiring all freshmen to live in the English language dormitory which can accommodate 1,200 students and professors. Residents are encouraged to communicate only in English during the program, which usually runs for a whole semester.

University rankings
| QS National | General | 24 |
| THE National | General | 18–21 |
| ARWU National | Research | 19–23 |
| QS Asia (Asia version) | General | =222 |
| THE Asia (Asia version) | General | 113 |
| ARWU World | Research | 701–800 |
| QS World | General | 781–790 |
| THE World | General | 601–800 |
| USNWR World | General | =1190 |

- Ranked 4th in the fields of education and finance, (Joong-Ang Ilbo's General Evaluation of Universities, 2014)
- Ranked 400–500 in QS World University Rankings 2016/17.
- Ranked 99th in Asia University Rankings 2013/14 (QS World University Rankings)
- Ranked 400–500 in Academic Ranking of World Universities, ARWU US, 2014
- Ranked 1st in student-faculty ratio, overall proportion of faculty and student enrollment (Joong-Ang Ilbo's General Evaluation of Universities, 2010)

== Notable people ==
- Stephen Kim Sou-hwan, cardinal
- Yoo Ji-tae, actor

== See also ==
- List of colleges and universities in South Korea
- Education in South Korea
