= Paul Roh Ki-nam =

The Most Reverend Paul Marie Kinam Ro
- Archbishop of Seoul
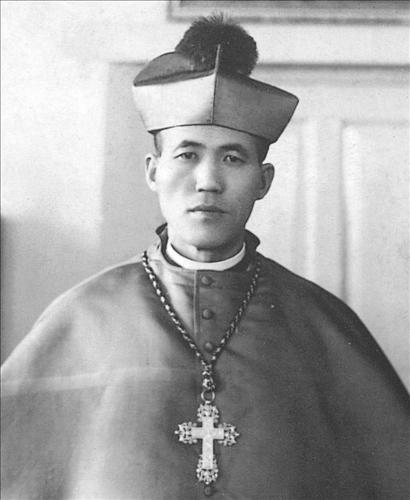
- Archdiocese: Seoul
- In office: 1962–1967
- Predecessor: Adrien Larribeau
- Successor: Stephen Kim Sou-hwan
- Other post: Titular Archbishop of Tituli in Proconsulari

Orders
- Ordination: 26 October 1930
- Consecration: 20 December 1942 by Andrien-Joseph Larribeau
- Rank: Metropolitan Archbishop

Personal details
- Born: January 22, 1902 South Pyongan Province, Korean Empire (Now North Korea)
- Died: June 25, 1984 (aged 81) Seoul, South Korea

Paul Marie Kinam Roh (22 January 1902 – 25 June 1984) was a Korean Catholic bishop who served as Apostolic Vicar of Seoul from 1940–1962 and Archbishop of Seoul from 1962–1967. He was noted as pro-American and anti-Communist in the Syngman Rhee years.

Catholic Church titles
Preceded by Adrien-Joseph Larribeau	Apostolic Vicar of Seoul; 10 November 1942 – 10 March 1962	Succeeded by himself as Archbishop
Preceded by himself as Apostolic Vicar	Archbishop of Seoul; 10 March 1962 – 23 March 1967	Succeeded by Stephen Kim Sou-hwan
