= Victorinus Youn Kong-hi =

Archbishop of Gwangju

- Archbishop of Gwangju
- Church: Catholic Church
- Archdiocese: Archdiocese of Gwangju
- In office: 25 October 1973 – 30 November 2000
- Predecessor: Peter Han Kong-ryel
- Successor: Andreas Choi Chang-mou
- Previous post: Bishop of Suwon (1963-1973)

Orders
- Ordination: 20 March 1950
- Consecration: 20 October 1963 by Pope Paul VI

Personal details
- Born: 8 November 1924 (age 101) Chinnamp'o, Heian'nan Province, Chōsen, Empire of Japan

Victorinus Youn Kong-hi (born 8 November 1924) was the third Archbishop, and current Archbishop Emeritus, of the Roman Catholic Archdiocese of Kwangju. Born in Nampho, South Pyongan, North Korea, he was ordained a priest of the Archdiocese of Seoul on 20 March 1950.

On 7 October 1963, he was appointed first Bishop of Suwon. Youn was later promoted to the third Archbishop of Gwangju on 25 October 1973. While Archbishop, he concluded an investigation into claims of Marian miracles at a shrine in Naju. He retired on 30 November 2000.

Catholic Church titles
New title	Bishop of Suwon; 7 October 1963 – 25 October 1973	Succeeded by Angelo Kim Nam-su
Preceded by Peter Han Kong-ryel	Archbishop of Gwangju; 25 October 1973 – 30 November 2000	Succeeded by Andreas Choi Chang-mou
