= Archdiocese of Gwangju =

Latin Catholic archdiocese in South Korea

Coordinates: 35.1500°N 126.9000°E

Archdiocese of Gwangju Archidioecesis Kvangiuensis 광주대교구
- Coat of arms

Location
- Country: South Korea
- Territory: Gwangju, South Jeolla
- Ecclesiastical province: Gwangju

Statistics
- Area: 12,596 km^{2} (4,863 sq mi)
- Population: Total; Catholics: (as of 2017); 3,360,194; 365,649 (10.8%)
- Parishes: 139

Information
- Denomination: Catholic
- Sui iuris church: Latin Church
- Rite: Roman Rite
- Established: April 13, 1937 (as Apostolic prefecture); March 10, 1962 (as Archdiocese)
- Cathedral: Im-dong Cathedral of the Sacred Heart of Jesus
- Co-cathedral: Buk-dong Cathedral
- Patron saint: Anselm of Canterbury

Current leadership
- Pope: Leo XIV
- Archbishop: Simon Ok Hyun-jin
- Bishops emeritus: Andreas Choi Chang-mou; Victorinus Youn Kong-hi; Hyginus Kim Hee-jong

Map

Website
- gjcatholic.or.kr

The Catholic Archdiocese of Gwangju (Latin: Archidioecesis Kvangiuensis, Hangul: 천주교 광주대교구) is a particular church of the Latin Church of the Catholic Church, one of the three Metropolitan sees of the Catholic Church in Korea. The Archdiocese covers the city of Gwangju and entire South Jeolla Province.

== History ==
On 13 April 1937 Pope Pius XI established the Prefecture Apostolic of Kwoszu. Pope Pius XII changed its name to the Prefecture Apostolic of Kwangju on 12 July 1950. It was elevated to a Vicariate Apostolic on 21 January 1957. Pope John XXIII elevated the vicariate to an archdiocese on 10 March 1962.

== Leadership ==
=== Ordinaries ===
==== Apostolic Prefects of Kwangju ====
- Owen McPolin (1937–1942)
- Thomas Asagoro Wakida (1942–1945)
- Owen McPolin (1945–1947)
- Patrick Thomas Brennan (1949–1950)
- Harold William Henry (1954–1957)

==== Apostolic Vicars of Kwangju ====
- Harold William Henry (1957–1962)

==== Archbishops of Gwangju ====
- Harold William Henry (1962–1971), appointed Apostolic Administrator of Cheju
- Peter Han Kong-ryel (1971–1973)
- Victorinus Youn Kong-hi (1973–2000)
- Andreas Choi Chang-mou (2000–2010)
- Hyginus Kim Hee-jong (2010–2022)
- Simon Ok Hyun-jin (2022–present)

=== Coadjutor Archbishops ===
- Andreas Choi Chang-mou (1999–2000)
- Hyginus Kim Hee-jong (2009–2010)

=== Auxiliary Bishops ===
- Andreas Choi Chang-mou (1994–1999)
- Hyginus Kim Hee-jong (2003–2009)
- Simon Ok Hyun-jin (2011–2022)
