= Schwarzbach =

Schwarzbach is a German name meaning "dark stream."

Schwarzbach may refer to:

- Schwarzbach (surname)
- Schwarzbach Railway, a narrow gauge railway in Saxon Switzerland
- rivers:
  - Schwarzbach (Große Mittweida), of Saxony, tributary of the Große Mittweida
  - Schwarzbach (Sebnitz), of Saxony, Germany, tributary of the Sebnitz
  - Schwarzbach (Mulde), of Saxony, Germany, tributary of the Mulde
  - Schwarzbach (White Elster), of Saxony, Germany, tributary of the White Elster
  - Schwarzbach (Werra), of Thuringia, Germany, tributary of the Werra
  - Schwarzbach (Aa), of North Rhine-Westphalia, Germany, right tributary of the Johannisbach, that in the later course is called Westfälische Aa
  - Schwarzbach (Bergisches Land), of the Bergisches Land, North Rhine-Westphalia, Germany, tributary of the Rhine
  - Schwarzbach (Emscher), of North Rhine-Westphalia, Germany, left tributary of the Emscher
  - Schwarzbach (Wupper), of North Rhine-Westphalia, Germany, right tributary of the Wupper
  - Schwarzbach (Blies), of Rhineland-Palatinate and Saarland, Germany, tributary of the Blies
  - Schwarzbach (Elmbach), of Hesse, Germany, tributary of the Elmbach
  - Schwarzbach (Ried), of the Hessian Ried, Hesse, Germany, tributary of the Rhine
  - Schwarzbach (Main), of Hesse, Germany, tributary of the Main
  - Schwarzbach (Klettgau), of the Canton of Zürich, Switzerland, and of Baden-Württemberg, Germany, tributary of the Klingengraben
  - Schwarzbach (Elsenz), of Baden-Württemberg, Germany
  - Schwarzbach (Günz), of Bavaria, Germany, tributary of the Günz
  - Schwarzbach (Laufach), of Bavaria, Germany, tributary of the Laufach
  - Schwarzbach (Saalach), of Bavaria, Germany, tributary of the Saalach
  - Schwarzbach (Reschbach), of Bavaria, Germany, tributary of the Reschbach
- municipalities and villages
  - Schwarzbach, Brandenburg, in the Oberspreewald-Lausitz district, Brandenburg, Germany
  - Schwarzbach (Elterlein), in the Ore Mountains in Saxony, Germany, today part of the town Elterlein
  - Schwarzbach, Thuringia, in the district of Greiz, Thuringia, Germany
  - Černá v Pošumaví, a village in South Bohemia, Czech Republic, known as Schwarzbach in German

== See also ==
- Schwarzenbach (disambiguation)
- Schwarzach (disambiguation)
