= Kumily Priory =

Monastery information
- Other name: St Michael's Priory
- Order: Congregation of Missionary Benedictines of Saint Ottilien, Order of Saint Benedict
- Established: 1987
- Dedication: St Michael
- Diocese: Syro-Malabar Catholic Diocese of Kanjirappally

People
- Founder: Fr Zacharias Kuruppacheril
- Prior: Rev. Fr. John Kaippallimyalil OSB

Site
- Location: Kumily, Idukki, Kerala, India

St Michael's Priory, Kumily, Idukki, Kerala, India, is a Benedictine monastery of the Congregation of the Missionary Benedictines of Saint Ottilien. The monastery was established in 1987 by Zacharias Kuruppacheril, an Indian secular priest. Located on the western slopes of the Cardamom Hills, around 150 km east of Kochi, the monastery is currently home to 13 monks and 6 brothers in formation. Prior Fr.John Kaippallimyalil is the community's superior.

== History ==
The monastic community of Kumily developed in a similar way to Incarnation Conventual Priory, Togo. Fr Zacharias Kuruppacheril, a secular priest of Kerala, spent 1975-1982 in Germany and Switzerland, studying catechetics and working in parishes. This experience brought him into contact with the Missionary Benedictine community of St Otmar's Abbey, Uznach, Switzerland. Upon his return to India, Fr Zacharias built a school for orphaned and impoverished children in Kumily. Within a few years, this establishment had grown into a large "Formation Center for Poor and Orphan Boys and Young Men" known as Don Bosco Bhavan. The facilities included a school, workshops, farm, vegetable gardens, and orchards.

Among those who worked with Fr Zacharias at Don Bosco Bhavan were a number of young men who had an interest in religious life. Fr Zacharias encouraged them to attend daily Mass and pray the Divine Office with him. For those who joined the community working at the orphanage, a daily routine of communal and private prayer, shared meals, and recreation became important. By 1989, three such young men expressed a desire to lead this life permanently. Fr Zacharias realized that such an endeavor would necessitate the guidance of an established religious community. With this in mind, he turned to the Congregation of Missionary Benedictines of Saint Ottilien.

In December 1988, Fr Zacharias wrote to Abbot Ivo Auf der Maur of St Otmar's Abbey, Uznach, Switzerland, explaining his intention to start a Benedictine community in Kumily. Fr Zacharias believed that the particular charism of the Missionary Benedictines would complement the foundation he planned to establish. The Council of the Congregation discussed Fr Zacharias' proposal. In early 1990, Archabbot Notker Wolf, accompanied by Abbot Stephan Schröer of Königsmünster and Fr Basil Doppenfeld, visited Kumily. The visit resulted in the decision that St Michael Benedictine Hermitage should be developed as a pre-foundation of the Congregation.

The Council of the Congregation charged Abbot Schröer with the task of assisting the Kumily community in their quest to establish a Benedictine monastery. In guidelines drawn up on May 10, 1990, the Council recommended that Kumily should remain a pre-foundation for four years. Under the guidance of Fr Zacharias, monastic candidates would be trained in the traditions of the Missionary Benedictines. In 1994, the Kumily monastery was canonically erected as a domus religiosa. This year also saw the foundation of St Michael's Retreat Center. In 2001, the monastery was raised to the status of a simple priory. The community was incorporated into the Syro-Malabar rite in 2003.

== Apostolate ==
The monks of St Michael Priory continue to administer Don Bosco Bhavan, the orphanage school that inspired the formation of the Benedictine community.

The monastic community also runs St Michael Retreat Center (founded in 1994) and Theo Farm.

== Dependencies ==
At this time, Kumily Priory does not have any dependent houses.

== Personnel ==
As of May 18, 2011, the monastic community of Kumily included eight monks in perpetual vows, five of them ordained. Some of these monks are on assignment at other monasteries of the Congregation. There are also two brothers in temporal vows, and one novice monk.

Fr Joseph Puthenpurayil became Prior of the community on March 14, 2004, succeeding the monastery's founder, Fr Zacharias Kuruppacheril. The Prior is assisted in his duties by Fr Nirmal Kanjooparampil, subprior.

== See also ==
- Congregation of Missionary Benedictines of Saint Ottilien
- Order of Saint Benedict
- Catholic Church in India
