= Servais (disambiguation) =

Servais is a commune in northern France.

Servais may also refer to:

- Servais (given name)
- Servais (surname)
- Servais Prize, a Luxembourgian literary award, awarded since 1992
- Servais Stradivarius, a cello crafted in 1701 by Antonio Stradivari

== See also ==
- Saint-Servais (disambiguation)
