= Schwarzach =

Schwarzach may refer to:

== Places ==
- Schwarzach im Pongau, a market town in the St. Johann im Pongau District in the Austrian state of Salzburg
- Schwarzach, Vorarlberg, a municipality in the Austrian state of Vorarlberg
  - Schwarzach in Vorarlberg railway station, a railway station in Schwarzach, Vorarlberg
- Schwarzach, Baden-Württemberg, a municipality in the district of Neckar-Odenwald-Kreis, in Baden-Württemberg, Germany
- Schwarzach am Main, a municipality in the district of Kitzingen in Bavaria in Germany
- Schwarzach, Lower Bavaria, a municipality in the district of Straubing-Bogen in Bavaria, Germany
- Schwarzach bei Nabburg, a municipality in the district of Schwandorf in Bavaria, Germany

== Rivers ==
- Svratka (river) or Schwarzach in German, a river in the South Moravian Region of the Czech Republic
- Schwarzach (Schussen), a river of Baden-Württemberg, Germany, tributary of the Schussen
- Schwarzach (Danube), a river of Baden-Württemberg, Germany, tributary of the Danube
- Schwarzach (Altmühl), a river of Bavaria, Germany, left tributary of the Altmühl
- Schwarzach (Main), a river of Bavaria, Germany, tributary of the Main
- Schwarzach (Naab), a river of Bavaria, Germany, tributary of the Naab
- Schwarzach (Rednitz), a river of Bavaria, Germany, tributary of the Rednitz

== See also ==
- Schwarzbach (disambiguation)
- Schwarzenbach (disambiguation)
