= Münsterschwarzach Abbey =

Coordinates: 49°48′19″N 10°13′54″E

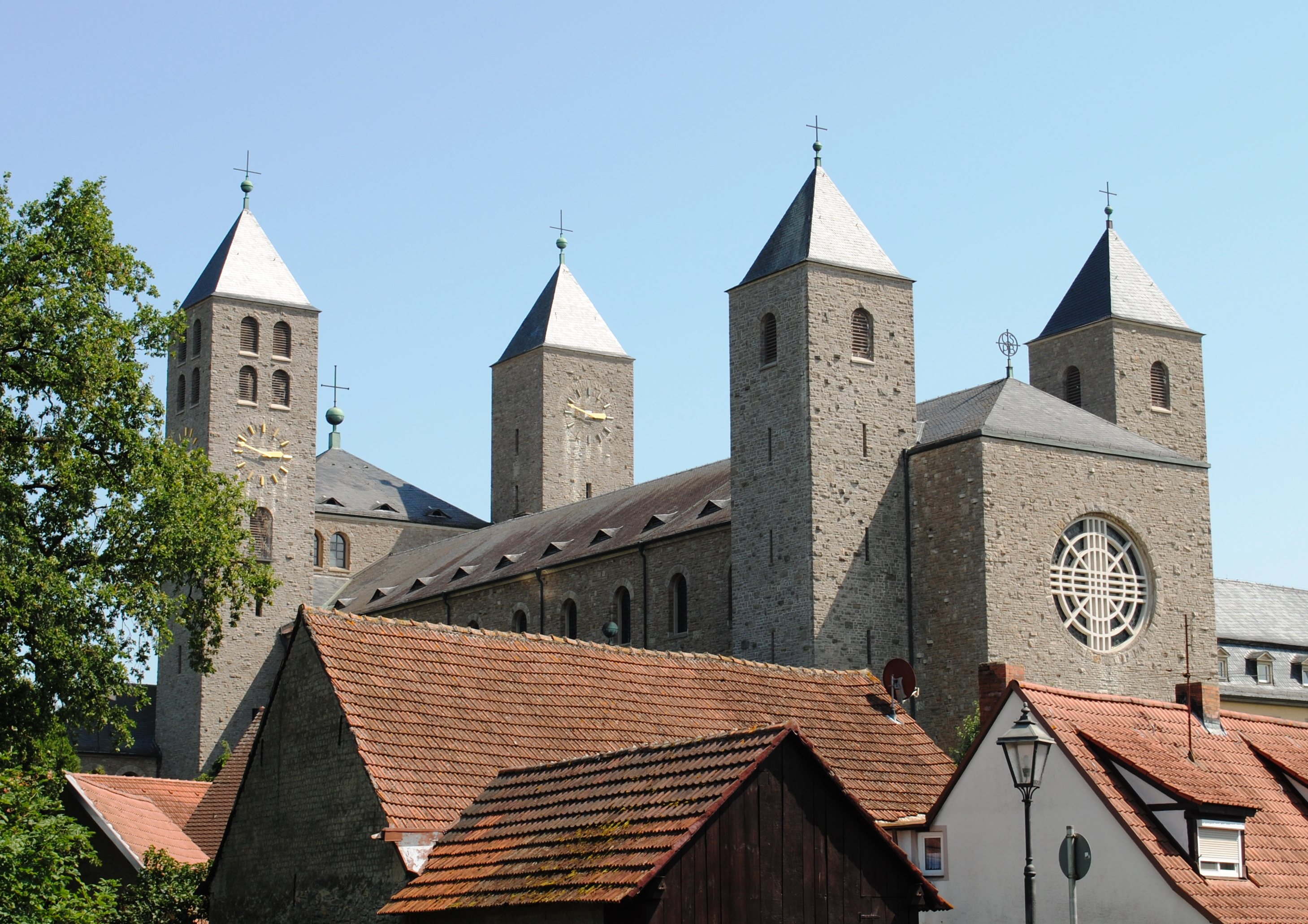
View of the abbey church

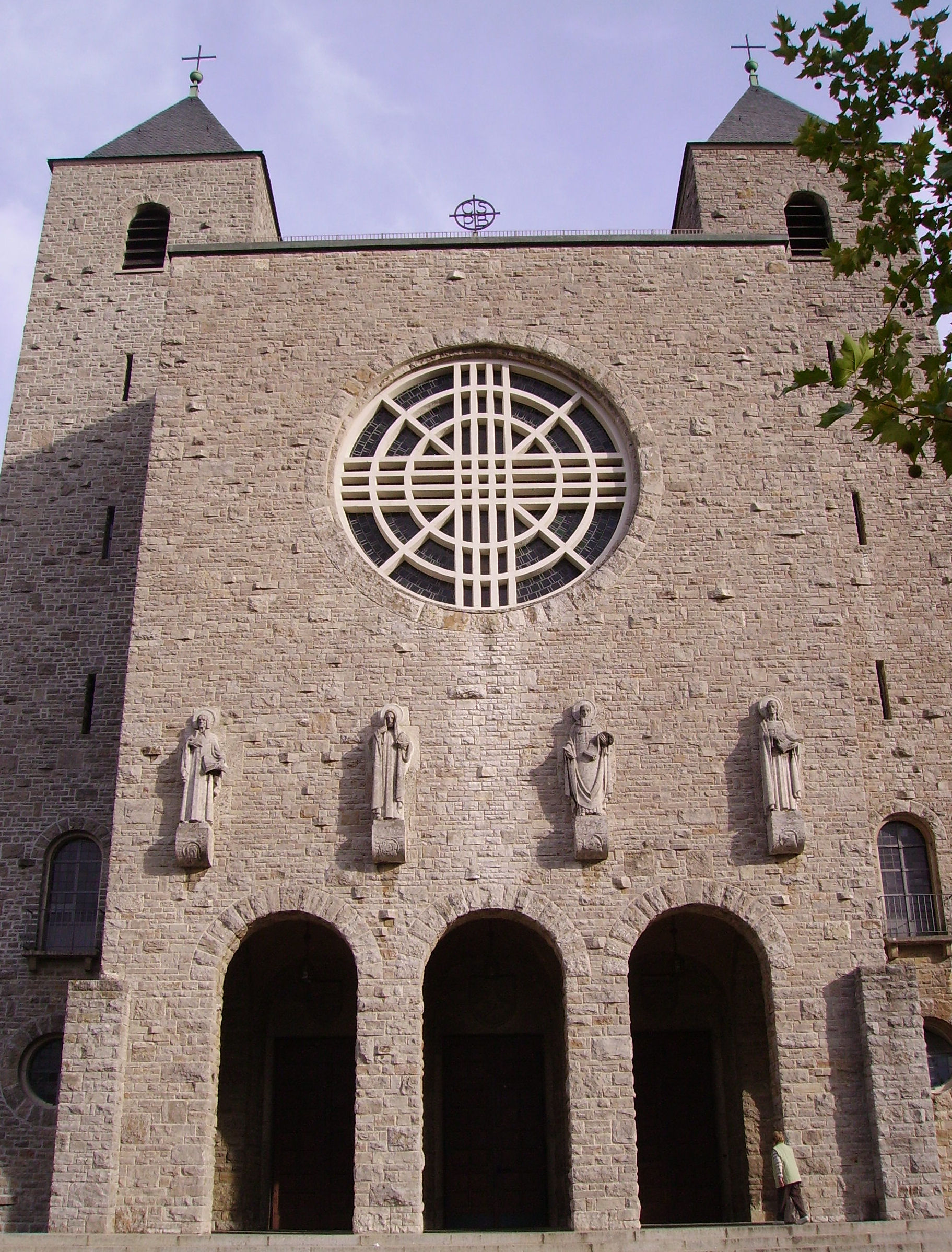
Portal

Münsterschwarzach Abbey (Abtei Münsterschwarzach, formerly often known as Kloster Schwarzach or Schwarzach Abbey), is a monastery of Benedictine monks in Germany. The abbey belongs to the Congregation of Saint Ottilien and is located in Schwarzach am Main, a small market town at the confluence of the rivers Schwarzach and Main in north-western Bavaria.

== Carolingian nunnery ==
The abbey, dedicated to the Holy Saviour, the Virgin Mary and Saint Felicity, was founded before 788 as a nunnery. It was a private foundation of the Carolingian ruling house: the abbesses were daughters of the imperial family, for example Theodrada (d. 853), a daughter of Charlemagne. After the death of the last Carolingian abbess, Bertha, in 877, the nuns left the abbey and it was taken over by Benedictine monks from Megingaudshausen.

In 2025 the monastery has close links to the Communität Casteller Ring order.

== First Benedictine monastery ==
Münsterschwarzach became a centre of monastic reform during the 12th century, when Bishop Adalbero of Würzburg, who was in close contact with the reform movements of Cluny, Gorze and Hirsau, appointed Egbert of Gorze as abbot. Egbert not only reformed and renewed the spiritual life of Münsterschwarzach but then, through the spread of the subsequent Münsterschwarzach reforms, exerted an influence far beyond it, from Harsefeld Archabbey near Stade in the north to Melk and Lambach in the south.

The monastery faced several severe problems in the following centuries, such as economic ruin, fires, and robberies. In the German Peasants' War in 1525, the monastery got almost completely destroyed. The abbey was restored under Abbot Johannes Burckhart (1563-1598), who rebuilt the library and reorganized the monastery's possessions. Abbot Johannes was considered a fighter of the Counter-Reformation and tried to re-catholicize the monastic villages.

After the Thirty Years' War, Abbot Remigius Winckel (1646-1654) had the monastery villages resettled, rebuilt the destroyed monastery mill, stocked up on livestock, and, by recruiting young novices, ensured a revival of the spiritual life of the abbey. Although his successor Benedikt Weidenbusch (1654–1672) was elected abbot in 1654, he was only an administrator until 1656. When he was elected, the only 22-year-old was not yet an ordained priest. He received the title of an abbot in 1656 after his ordination and established a college in the abbey while he was abbot. In a fire in 1677, Abbot Placidus Büchs (1672–1691) risked his life to save most of the valuables from the outbuildings, which were destroyed entirely. He also worked to rebuild buildings that had been destroyed in the war. Towards the end of the 17th century, a baroque plan for the church began to be realized. The architects were Valentino Pezani, whose guest house built in 1696/97 is still partially preserved, and Josef Greising.

In the 18th century a Baroque basilica was commissioned from Balthasar Neumann, with frescoes in the cupolas by Holzer; it was dedicated in 1743 by Bishop Friedrich Karl von Schönborn.

In 1803 the abbey was abandoned in the course of the secularisation of Bavaria. The monastic buildings were auctioned off. In 1805 the abbey church was sold and profaned. In 1810 the buildings were struck by lightning and severely damaged by the subsequent fire, and between 1821 and 1827 the remains of the church were entirely, and those of the monastic buildings largely demolished.

== Second Benedictine monastery ==
In 1913 the remains of the old abbey were re-acquired by the Missionary Benedictines, along with the necessary land to support it. The first abbot after the restoration was Dom Placidus Vogel (1914-1937). He was followed by Dom Burkhard Utz (1937-1959) and Dom Bonifaz Vogel (1959-1982), a nephew of Abbot Placidus. The monumental abbey church with its four towers was built between 1935 and 1938, when it was dedicated. The architect was Albert Bosslet.

Between 1941 and 1945 the abbey was confiscated by the National Socialists and used as a military hospital. Although the monastic community had been expelled, some monks were able to remain as workers in the hospital. The abbey was erected again after World War II.

There are two dependent priories of the abbey: Christ the King Priory in Schuyler, Nebraska, USA, established in 1935 and Damme Priory, Germany established in 1962. The present abbot is Abbot Michael Reepen OSB.

== The abbey church ==
After the fire in 1810, the old abbey church was used as a quarry and thus left to decay. After the abbey was re-established in 1913, a new church was to be built under Abbot Placidus Vogel. It was built from 1935 to 1938 according to the plans of Prof. Albert Boßlet. The church was consecrated on September 11, 1938.

The abbey church is about 289 feet long, 102 feet wide, and 85 feet high. The east towers are 171 feet high; the west towers are 125 feet. The interior of the church is characterized by the simplicity and clarity of the forms. While the monks' choir is kept dark, the sanctuary is filled with bright light. Above the altar, a statue of Jesus Christ stands in the center of the sanctuary. The medallion to the left of the cross shows the sacrifice of a lamb, a symbol of the Old Covenant. The medallion on the right represents two loaves and a cup, representing the bloodless sacrifice of the New Covenant. On the sides of the church, there are twelve side altars dedicated to certain saints who have a special connection to the Münsterschwarzach abbey. Except for the organ, the monastery created the entire interior on its own. The statue of the Virgin Mary on the right of the altar was created by Brother Franz Blaser († 1930). Abbot Placidus (†1943), the builder of the church, is buried in a high grave in front of the crypt.

== See also ==
- 18th-century Western domes
