= Tororo Priory =

Monastery information
- Other name: Christ the King Priory
- Order: Congregation of Missionary Benedictines of Saint Ottilien, Order of Saint Benedict
- Established: November 25, 1984
- Dedication: Christ the King
- Diocese: Roman Catholic Archdiocese of Tororo

People
- Founder: John Neudegger
- Prior: Fidelis

Site
- Location: Tororo, Eastern Region, Uganda

Christ the King Priory, Tororo, Eastern Region, Uganda, is a Benedictine monastery of the Congregation of Missionary Benedictines of Saint Ottilien. Established in the 1980s by Fr John Neudegger, OSB, the monastery is currently home to 24 monks. Fr Prior Fidelis is the community's superior.

== History ==
=== Early years ===
Throughout the 1970s and 1980s, Uganda was embroiled in civil war. Hostilities forced the withdrawal of many Christian missionaries from the country. A number of Benedictine sisters found themselves in need of spiritual direction, and requested that Abbot Lambert Dörr of Peramiho Abbey send one of his Missionary Benedictine monks to assist their community. In 1980, Abbot Lambert assigned a Benedictine priest, then residing at Nairobi dependency of Peramiho, to Uganda to minister to the sisters.

Fr John Neudegger arrived in Tororo in 1981. Though much of his time was occupied with the spiritual direction of the Benedictine sisters, he also had the opportunity to recruit local vocations for the Nairobi monastery from which he had come. Indeed, monastic vocations proved to be more fruitful in Uganda than back in Kenya. This led to the foundation of a house in Uganda for the training of indigenous monastic vocations. Neudegger purchased some property on the outskirts of Tororo, and built a few simple brick buildings. This first foundation was placed under the Council of the Ottilien Congregation. Fr Aelred Cousins, a Benedictine of Belmont Abbey, joined Neudegger in 1983, aiding in the spiritual formation of the candidates.

At the Congregation's General Chapter in 1984, the Tororo project was accepted as a pre-foundation under the sponsorship of the Council of the Congregation. Neudegger's monastery was given four years to prove that the Benedictine life could survive in Uganda. Like the monastic community of Agbang, the venture was seen as an attempt to use local resources and skills to build a truly African monastic community.

In 1988, when the next General Chapter met, the delegates were satisfied with the profess of the Tororo monastery. The community was allowed to open a canonical novitiate, in which vocations would be trained according to the principles of the Missionary Benedictines. To aid this, monks of the Congregation would be sent to the foundation to help in the physical and spiritual development of the monastery.

=== Later Development ===
Despite its initial promise, the community of Tororo had to deal with the ongoing internecine violence in Uganda. On August 25, 1990, one of the brothers was brutally murdered.

The monks of Tororo are employed in engineering, automotive maintenance, and carpentry. A fine art studio on the monastery premises promotes locally inspired art. The monks also provide necessary services to the local population, repairing eyeglasses and running a dispensary. An agricultural school and a kindergarten are attached to the monastery.

On November 21, 1993, the monastic foundation at Tororo was raised to the status of a simple priory. The monastery remains under the direct control of the Council of the Congregation.

== Dependencies ==
At this time, Christ the King Priory has no dependent houses.

== Personnel ==
As of May 18, 2011, 13 solemnly professed monks (six of them priests) resided at Tororo. At this time, the community also included seven temporally professed monks, four novices, and three postulants.

Fr Prior Edward Etengu is the current superior of the monastic community. He was appointed prior on March 29, 2006.

== See also ==
- Congregation of Missionary Benedictines of Saint Ottilien
- Roman Catholicism in Uganda
