= Hanga Abbey =

Tanzanian Benedictine monastery

- Interactive map of Hanga Abbey

Monastery information
- Full name: Abbey of St. Maurus and St. Placidus
- Order: Missionary Benedictines of St. Ottilien
- Established: 1956
- Mother house: Peramiho Abbey
- Dedication: Saint Maurus and St. Placidus
- Diocese: Songea

People
- Founders: Abbot-Bishop Eberhard Spiess, O.S.B.
- Abbot: The Right Rev. Octavian Thomas Masingo, O.S.B. (effective 1 August 2016)
- Prior: Jerome Mlelwa, O.S.B.

Site
- Location: Hanga, Ruvuma, Tanzania
- Coordinates: 10°26′26.925″S 35°47′37.218″E

The Abbey of St. Maurus and St. Placidus is a Tanzanian Benedictine monastery of the Congregation of Missionary Benedictines of Saint Ottilien in Hanga, Ruvuma Region. Established in 1956 by Abbot-Bishop Eberhard Spiess as a formation house for African monastic candidates, the monastery is currently home to 122 monks. The abbey operates schools and a dispensary for the people of the local village and a seminary for the Roman Catholic Archdiocese of Songea.

== Origins ==
Since their early days in German East Africa, the Missionary Benedictines focused exclusively on establishing Roman Catholicism among African communities. The work of the missionary-monks, which included the creation of parishes, schools, and hospitals, did not allow for a concerted effort in recruiting African monastic vocations. However, a few individual Missionary Benedictine monks did take the initiative. Fr Severin Hofbauer, who had created a minor seminary in 1926, attempted to recruit those seminarians who expressed an interest in monastic life. By 1948, Hofbauer's successor, Fr Otmar Morger, knew of several young men interested in joining the monastic community at Peramiho. However, the Congregation's Archabbot Chrysostomus Schmid denied them this request, desiring that Africans form their own monastic congregations rather than become Missionary Benedictines.

Abbot-Bishop Eberhard Spiess was more receptive to the desire of Africans to join the Ottilien Congregation. However, he realized that the existing Tanzanian communities of Ndanda Abbey and Peramiho Abbey, exclusively European and predominantly German, would not be ideal locations for the formation of African monks. Therefore, Spiess chose to create a foundation separate from these abbeys, a monastery that would allow African monks the opportunity to adapt the Rule of Benedict to their own cultural circumstances. With this in mind, in 1956 he formed a team of Missionary Benedictines who would act as formators for African monastic candidates. The next year, an "African monastery" was opened at Liganga, Tanzania. This early foundation was quickly overwhelmed with numerous candidates, and soon relocated to Hanga village, within the Roman Catholic Archdiocese of Songea, 80 km east of the Abbey of Peramiho and 70 km north of Songea.

Describing this first African monastic community, Spiess wrote, "The main idea of monastic adaptation consists of the attempt to shape the monastery and the life-rhythm of the monks in such a way that it preserves the essential elements of Benedictine spirituality while at the same time reflecting African thinking and feeling." Further, Spiess hoped that the size of the monastic community would be rather small, in order that it would not run into what he perceived to be some of the downsides of larger monasteries, including a lack of flexibility and adaptability.

The Hanga foundation was granted ten years to adapt Benedictine life to an African cultural setting. This initial period, lasting until 1965, saw a team of German Missionary Benedictines reside at the monastery. These included an agronomist, a formation director, and a master builder, as well as Fr Chrysostomus (not to be confused with Archabbot Chrysostomus Schimd), who acted as the community's first superior.

== Expansion ==
The number of monks at Hanga quickly grew, though the number of monks ordained to the priesthood remained very small. Such large numbers presented difficulties for the early community, and made it challenging to match the ideal of a small, independent African monastery as had been envisioned by Abbot-Bishop Eberhard Spiess. In large part, this was because Hanga lacked any precedent. Thus, elements from existing Missionary Benedictine monasteries such as St Ottilien, Ndanda, and Peramiho were applied to the situation at Hanga. Self-sufficiency in these populous, culturally European monasteries was characterized by large-scale agricultural operations, artisanal work, and the practice of sophisticated trades. Such monasteries as Ndanda and Peramiho, though existing on African soil, in fact received personnel and support from Europe. With this in mind, the monks of Hanga struggled to rely solely on local resources and talents.

Year	Monks (ordained)
1960	15 (2)
1970	46 (2)
1980	76 (4)
1990	153 (10)

Despite these initial difficulties, the monastery received approval from the Holy See on June 18, 1965. At this time, the initial orientation team of Germans returned to the Abbey of Peramiho. Six years later, the monastery achieved independence, being raised to the status of a conventual priory under the leadership of Conventual Prior Fr Gregory Mwageni.

Quickly, Hanga evolved into a large monastic complex, including a secondary school for candidates of male religious institutes, extensive agricultural operations, and various workshops. Further, the monks began to administer a secondary school for pupils from Hanga village; youth work would be one of the community's primary apostolates. At the same time, the monastery's large numbers allowed for the foundation of a number of dependencies throughout Tanzania.

On December 13, 1993, the monastery was raised to the status of an abbey. On January 2, 1994, Alcuin Nyirenda, O.S.B., was elected the community's first abbot, becoming the first African abbot within the Ottilien Congregation.

== Apostolic Work ==
The monastic community of Hanga provides various forms of apostolic work. Monks administer guest houses at the abbey itself, in Dar es Salaam, and in Mbeya. Additionally, the monks are involved in a "Cultural and Responsible Tourism" program.

The monastery is also host to multiple educational institutes, including Hanga Religious Seminary, Hanga Vocational Training Center, Nakagugu Formation House, St. Benedict Secondary School, and St. Laurent Primary School. As of 2011, the religious seminary counted 143 pupils, while 280 attended St Benedict's Secondary School.

== Dependencies ==
Many of the monks of the Abbey of Hanga are occupied at a number of dependent monastic foundations. One of these, Mvimwa, became an independent abbey in 2001.

- St John Bosco Formation House, Nakaguru, Archdiocese of Songea: Founded in 1987; Bro Odilo Matembo, superior of two monks.
- St Teresia of Lisieux Priory, Katibunga, Diocese of Mpika: Founded in 1987, raised to Simple Priory in 2011; Prior Fr Willibrord Nzota, superior of ten monks.
- St Joseph's Farm, Nole, Diocese of Njombe: Founded in 1988; Fr Salvatori Ngimbudzi, superior of five monks.
- St Placidus Procure, Dar es Salaam, Archdiocese of Dar es Salaam: Founded in 1992; Bro Kizito Ndunguru, superior of two monks.
- St Bernard's Priory, Kipalapala, Archdiocese of Tabora: Founded in 1984, raised to Simple Priory in 1992; Prior Bro. Romanus Kazyoba, superior of five monks.
- St Benedict's Monastery, Mbeya, Diocese of Mbeya: Founded in 1993 as a domus religiosa; Bro. Godfrid Mbawala, superior of four monks.
- St Benedict's Monastery, Pugu, Archdiocese of Dar es Salaam: Founded in 1888, destroyed in 1889, refounded in 1999 as domus religiosa; Fr. Richard Migodela, superior.

== Personnel ==
As of May 18, 2011, 97 solemnly professed monks (21 of them priests) were members of the monastic community at Hanga. At this time, the abbey also included 20 temporally professed monks, five novices, and eight postulants.

Effective 1 August 2016, when he completes graduate studies, Abbot Octavian Masingo, O.S.B., is the current superior of the monastic community. He was elected and confirmed for a twelve-year term on January 23, 2016. Until then the abbey is being ruled by Prior Jerome Mlelwa, O.S.B. The first abbot of the community was Alcuin Nyirenda, O.S.B., who led them from 1994-2004. He was succeeded by Thadei Mhagama, O.S.B. (2004-2016).

== See also ==
- Congregation of Missionary Benedictines of Saint Ottilien
- Roman Catholicism in Tanzania
- Order of Saint Benedict
