= Digos Conventual Priory =

Catholic monastery in Davao del Sur, Philippines

Monastery information
- Other name: St. Benedict's Conventual Priory
- Order: Congregation of Missionary Benedictines of Saint Ottilien, Order of Saint Benedict
- Denomination: Catholic
- Established: June 11, 1983
- Dedication: St Benedict
- Diocese: Digos

People
- Founders: Abbot Emeritus Odo Haas, OSB
- Prior: Edgar Friedman

Site
- Location: Digos, Davao del Sur, Philippines

St. Benedict's Conventual Priory, Digos, Davao del Sur, Philippines, is a Benedictine monastery of the Congregation of Missionary Benedictines of Saint Ottilien. Established in 1983 at the request of Bishop Generoso Camiña of the Diocese of Digos, the monastery is currently home to 21 monks. Conventual Priory Fr Edgar Friedmann is the community's superior.

== History ==
=== Creating a Foundation ===
In 1981, Bishop Generoso Camiña of the Diocese of Digos asked Archabbot Notker Wolf to establish a monastery of Missionary Benedictines on the island of Mindanao. Archabbot Wolf visited Digos in the autumn of that year, and then submitted a report to the Council of the Congregation. The Council decided that a foundation should be made, to be under the authority of the Council itself rather than a particular monastery of the Congregation.

However, the council's decision did not meet with unanimous approval among Missionary Benedictine monks. Some monks voiced concern over the declining numbers of monks in European monasteries, questioning whether a foundation in the Philippines, not an area traditionally served by the Missionary Benedictines, was prudent. Additionally, Mindanao's tumultuous political situation provided further reason for concern.

Despite these questions, the planned foundation proceeded. In autumn 1982, Odo Haas, Abbot Emeritus of St Maurus and St Placidus Abbey, Waegwan, and two other Missionary Benedictine monks arrived in Digos. This initial team was soon joined by two Korean monks. Such a combination presented the first occasion in which monks from a European "mother abbey" and monks from a mother abbey's foundation worked together to establish a new monastic community.

=== Growth of the Monastery ===
St Benedict's Monastery was opened on July 11, 1983. The first facilities included a church, a guesthouse, a retreat center, and a cloister that could accommodate twelve monks. On May 20, 1986, the church was consecrated by Bishop Camiña. The Bishop of Digos was accompanied by Archbishop Antonio Lloren Mabutas of Davao and Bishop Patricio Hacbang Alo of Mati, who expressed their hope that the presence of the Missionary Benedictines would spread throughout Mindanao.

For the young community, Bishop Camiña envisioned the performance of extraordinary pastoral work, to include the preaching of retreats and the provision of adult catechesis. The monks themselves wanted to maintain a peaceful monastery that could provide a location for Christians to deepen their faith, while at the same time obliging Bishop Camiña's wishes inasmuch as these did not conflict with a life in accordance with the Rule of Benedict. Further, the monks began agricultural operations on their 28ha in an effort to establish a regular income for the monastery.

The combination of Korean and German monks, living together in monastic community, encouraged local vocations, which could have been stunted by a culturally homogeneous monastic community. The community began to recruit local vocations in 1984. By 1988, four monks had professed temporal vows; two of these made solemn profession in 1991. The growing numbers of the community contributed to the monks' primary apostolate, retreat work.

On July 11, 1989, exactly seven years since its foundation, St Benedict's Monastery was raised to the status of a simple priory, still under the authority of the Council of the Congregation. Seven years later, on July 11, 1996, the monastery became a conventual priory, gaining independent status.

== Apostolic Work ==
The monastic community of Digos Conventual Priory supports itself and the local community by means of a number of apostolates.

- Agriculture: Farms and gardens produce various crops, fruits, and vegetables, especially coconut and mango.
- Animal Husbandry: Dairy cattle, poultry, and hogs are raised at the monastery.
- Orchidaria: Flower production takes place at Digos and at St Anselm's Study House, Davao.
- "The Monastery Store": Recently established, this locations sells milk and milk chocolate produced by the monastery. The monastery also delivers milk to local schools.
- "St Benedict's Clinic": A staff of monks and volunteer doctors provide free medical assistance to impoverished people. Additionally, free clinics are occasionally offered in other localities.
- Scholarship Program: Around one hundred college students are assisted in their efforts to attain graduation.
- Retreat House: Opened shortly after the monastery's foundation, the retreat center allows for individual and group retreats. Retreatants oftentimes join the monastic community for the liturgy.

== Dependencies ==
St Anselm's Study House, Davao, Mindanao, Philippines is the only dependent house of St Benedict Conventual Priory. The foundation, 45 km from Digos, was established in 1988 for monks engaged in clerical studies at Davao's theological school. At present, five Missionary Benedictine monks reside at St Anselm's Study House, as well as some monks from the Sylvestrine Benedictine monastery in Cebu. The study house's superior is Fr Philip Calambro.

== Personnel ==
In 1990, the community included 21 monks: four Germans, two Koreans, and fifteen Filipinos. At this time, eight of the Filipinos had professed temporal vows, three were in the novitiate, and four were postulant monks.

As of May 18, 2011, 11 solemnly professed monks (seven of them priests) were members of the monastic community at Digos. At this time, the conceptual priory also included ten temporally professed monks, four of them studying theology in Davao.

Conventual Prior Fr Edgar Friedmann is the current superior of the monastic community. He was elected and confirmed on October 26, 2002, and reelected in 2008. Prior Edgar is assisted in his duties by Fr Patrick Mariano, subprior.

== See also ==
- Congregation of Missionary Benedictines of Saint Ottilien
- Catholic Church in the Philippines
- Order of Saint Benedict
