= Wonsan Agricultural University =

University in North Korea

- 원산농업대학
- Other names: Wonsan University of Agriculture
- Established: 1948; 78 years ago
- Location: Wonsan, Kangwon Province, North Korea; 39.195°N 127.373°E

- Wonsan Agricultural University
- Hangul: 원산농업대학
- RR: Wonsan nongeop daehak
- MR: Wŏnsan nongŏp taehak

Wonsan Agricultural University (Korean: 원산농업대학) is a public agricultural university in Wonsan, North Korea. The university was established in 1948 and is accredited by the North Korean Ministry of Education.

== History ==
Before becoming a university in 1948, Wonsan Agricultural University was the site of the Territorial Abbey of Tokwon. German Benedictine monks belonging to the Congregation of Missionary Benedictines of Saint Ottilien founded the abbey in 1927-28. First, a seminary building was built, and then between 1929 and 1932 a Neo-Romanesque monastery and a church were both built.

Following World War II, after the liberation of Korea and surrender of Japan in 1945, the abbey remained and continued operating. In 1948-49, the abbey was closed and was turned into Wonsan Agricultural University. The seminary was turned into the No. 2 Teaching building and the monastery-church was turned into the No. 1 Teaching Building. The university was the first agricultural university in the county of North Korea.

During the Korean War, the No. 1 Teaching Building was bombed and partially destroyed. Following the bombings, the building was repaired. The monks, still part of the Territorial Abbey of Tokwon moved to South Korea and established Waegwan Abbey in 1952.

Around 1980, a four story dormitory was built for the purpose of housing foreign students.

Wonsan Agricultural University is the largest agricultural university in North Korea.

== Education ==
Students at Wonsan Agricultural University learn under the Juche ideology. At the university, students learn about farming, agricultural management economics, veterinary sciences, animal husbandry, agricultural biology, fruit farming, geology/mineral sciences, and other agricultural related fields.

Wonsan Agricultural University offers a five-year degree program.

Foreign students are able to apply to the university and if accepted, they are taught Korean until they can integrate with the regular students.

== Faculties ==
Wonsan Agricultural University's campus is composed of the No. 1 Teaching Building and the No. 2 Teaching Building, a library, administration buildings, dormitories, miniature practice farms, and a greenhouse that Kim Jong-il once stood in. The greenhouse has a red triangle marking the location where Kim Jong-il stood and he was also known to often visit the university. The area surrounding the university grounds is dense with trees and contains a pine tree planted in 1890, which is considered one of the "State Natural Treasures" by the North Korean government.

== Wonsan University of Fisheries ==
The Wonsan University of Fisheries was founded in 1959 and was a former department of the Wonsan Agricultural University. The University of Fisheries trains fishery technicians in marine product processing, fish breeding and aquaculture, and mechanical engineering. The Wonsan University of Fisheries also has its own training ship.
