= Our Lady of the Plentiful Catch Monastery =

Monastery information
- Other name: Osornoe Monastery
- Order: Congregation of Missionary Benedictines of Saint Ottilien, Order of Saint Benedict
- Established: 2006
- Dedication: Our Lady of the Plentiful Catch
- Diocese: Roman Catholic Archdiocese of Maria Santissima in Astana

Site
- Location: Osornoe, Kazakhstan

Our Lady of the Plentiful Catch Monastery, Osornoe, Kazakhstan, is a Benedictine monastery of the Congregation of Missionary Benedictines of Saint Ottilien. Established in 2006 by the Abbey of Uznach, the monastery is currently home to two monks. Fr Joseph Schnider is the community's superior.

== History ==
On October 1, 2006, two monks of Uznach Abbey, Fr Matthias Beer and Fr Joseph Maria Schnider, were sent on mission to Kazakhstan. The monks established a cella at the village of Osornoe. In 1941, the residents of Osornoe were spared from famine when a large number of fish miraculously appeared in a nearby meltwater lake. Attributed to the Virgin Mary, the miracle was chosen as the name of the new monastic foundation.

Upon their arrival, the pioneering Missionary Benedictines moved into a small wooden house. They soon discovered that the facility could not withstand the region's cold winters, and by the spring of 2007, they had begun to renovate and expand the cella. In addition to accommodations for the monks themselves, the new monastery can house monastic candidates and guests.

== Apostolic work ==
After learning the Russian language, the monks of Osornoe began mission work. As ordained priests, they have been able to provide pastoral ministry to a church in Osornoe, a number of outstations, and a nearby monastery of Carmelites. Additionally, the monks are involved in health care and youth ministry.

== See also ==
- Congregation of Missionary Benedictines of Saint Ottilien
- Catholicism in Kazakhstan
- Uznach Abbey
- Order of Saint Benedict
