= Yenki Abbey =

1922–1946 Catholic monastery in China

Monastery information
- Other name: Holy Cross Abbey
- Order: Congregation of Missionary Benedictines of Saint Ottilien, Order of Saint Benedict
- Established: 1922
- Disestablished: 1946
- Dedication: Holy Cross
- Diocese: Diocese of Yanji

People
- Abbot: Theodore Breher

Site
- Location: Yenki (Yanji), Jilin, China

Holy Cross Abbey, Yenki (Yanji), Jilin, China, was a Benedictine monastery of the Congregation of Missionary Benedictines of Saint Ottilien. Established in 1922 as a mission station, the monastery later became the seat of the Vicariate Apostolic of Yenki. After the withdrawal of Soviet forces following World War II, the monastery was suppressed by the People's Republic of China. While many of the monks were repatriated to Europe, others moved to South Korea and founded the Abbey of Waegwan.

== History ==
=== Prefecture Apostolic of Yenki ===
In 1920, Propaganda Fide created the Vicariate Apostolic of Wonsan, with the Abbey of St Benedict, Tokwon, as its administrative and spiritual center. The next year, Propaganda Fide added to the Vicariate Apostolic parts of eastern Manchuria that included large Korean populations. However, such a large mission field was too vast to administer from one location. On July 19, 1928, the Prefecture Apostolic of Yenki was formed out of the northern parts of the Vicariate Apostolic of Wonsan. On December 22, 1922, the Missionary Benedictines of Tokwon had established a mission station in Yenki, which was now converted into a proper monastery. The monks of Yenki served primarily as missionaries, living at parishes and occasionally returning to the monastery.

Between 1930 and 1933, minor and major seminaries were opened in Yenki, and local candidates were accepted into monastic life. While ordained Missionary Benedictines administered the seminaries, the abbey's brothers ran workshops and a printing press, producing religious literature in Korean. The monastery continued to expand, and on August 1, 1934, it was raised to the status of an abbey, placed under the patronage of the Holy Cross. Fr Theodore Breher became the community's first (and only) abbot. Breher was consecrated bishop when the Prefecture Apostolic of Yenki became a vicariate apostolic in 1937.

In the midst of the flourishing of the Abbey of Yenki, the monastery's mission stations oftentimes fell victim to the violent atmosphere of Manchukuo, as Chinese and Korean partisans resisted the Japanese occupying forces. Missionary Benedictine monks were harassed by the Japanese authorities. In one instance, a monk was shot and killed by a drunk Japanese officer.

=== Suppression ===
Following the close of the Pacific War, the monastery fell under the supervision of the Soviet occupation. Russian officers protected the monastery, ensuring that the monks were not molested. Looking forward to what seemed to be a hospitable environment, the Vicariate Apostolic of Yenki became a diocese on April 11, 1946. However, that same month, the Soviet occupation left Yenki, leaving the monastery in the hands of the Chinese communist regime.

In May 1946, Chinese soldiers put the monks under house arrest. Those at mission stations were rounded up, or, as in the case of Pater Servatius Ludwig, were killed on the spot. The Missionary Benedictines, many of them German monks were accused of Nazism and of cooperation with the Empire of Japan. For a time, some were sent to forced labor camps on the border of China and North Korea. Two years later, the monks were permitted to return to the Abbey of Yenki, where they attempted to set up a habitable environment. While they were able to reestablish community life, the mission apostolate of the monks was curtailed by the Chinese authorities, who were intent on halting the spread of Christianity in Manchuria.

By the winter of 1949-1950, the relationship with the authorities had worsened. The monastery was under government control, and the first groups of monks were repatriated to Europe. Among these was the sickly Abbot-Bishop Breher. In his stead, Prior Raymond Ackermann acted as administrator of the abbey. Forced to evacuate the monastery, the community under Ackermann subsisted in a convent, a Korean parish, and a mission station before all the monks were expelled from the country. The last group of Missionary Benedictines fled the People's Republic of China in August 1952.

Three Korean members of the Abbey of Yenki were able to reach South Korea, where they joined a large number of monks who had survived the suppression of the Territorial Abbey of Tokwon. Together, they founded the Abbey of Waegwan, successfully continuing Benedictine monasticism on the Korean Peninsula.

=== Contemporary History ===
After an absence of fifty years, the monks of the Congregation of Missionary Benedictines of Saint Ottilien revived Holy Cross Abbey in 2001. As of 2011, the Chinese monastic community included two monks in perpetual vows (one of them ordained), two monks in temporal vows, and one postulant. Two of these monks were serving at the newly erected Holy Cross Monastery in Kouqian, a town in Yongji County, Jilin. Here, the monks serve at a parish and administer a home for the elderly. Though the monks maintain a residence in Yenki, a hotel now rests on the site of Holy Cross Abbey.

== Dependencies ==
At the time of its suppression, the Abbey of Yenki did not have any dependent monastic houses. However, eight mission stations throughout the Diocese of Yenki were served by the Missionary Benedictines of Yenki.

== Personnel ==
Upon the opening of the monastery's minor seminary in 1930, the monastic community at Yenki included 24 monks, 17 of them ordained.

By 1940, the monastic population had risen to 44, 25 ordained.

In 1950, the residual community numbered 18 monks, 13 ordained. Five members were Korean.

== See also ==
- Congregation of Missionary Benedictines of Saint Ottilien
- Territorial Abbey of Tokwon
- Roman Catholicism in China
- Order of Saint Benedict
