= Fulling mills in England =

Fulling mills in England were introduced in the last half of the twelfth century. This application of water power to fulling was developed and spread by religious orders, primarily by the Cistercians and the military orders such as the Templars and Knights Hospitaller. Bernard of Clairvaux wrote to Henry I of England in 1131 as regards his plan to establish a daughter house of Clairvaux Abbey as an outpost in what was to become Rievaulx Abbey.
