= Ndanda =

- Town
- Location of Ndanda Ndanda (Africa)
- Coordinates: 10°30′00″S 39°01′00″E
- Country: Tanzania
- Region: Mtwara Region
- District: Masasi
- Elevation: 347 m (1,138 ft)

Population (2002 census)
  - Total: 2 024
- Time zone: UTC+3 (EAT)
- Area code: 023
- Website: Regional website

Ndanda is a town in Mtwara Region of southern Tanzania. Ndanda is home to Ndanda High School, an A level all-boys boarding school with approximately 1200 students. The school was created by the Benedictines of Ndanda Abbey but it is now a Government school. Ndanda has the advantage of being on the road which links the coastal towns of Lindi and Mtwara with Masasi which was given a tarred surface before 1980. Another advantage is the existence of a river which supplies water to the town throughout the year. During the normal dry season of at least five months the water continues to flow from springs at the edge of the Makonde Plateau. Ndanda has a major hospital which was also built by the Benedictines but now has some Government support. The Abbey has busy workshops for vehicle maintenance, construction, electrical installation, shoemaking, tailoring, metalwork, plumbing, carpentry and furniture making. All departments provide training to obtain National qualifications. The buildings of a leprosy hospital belonging to the Abbey became redundant and have now been renovated and added to for use as a secondary school for boys. In 2014 the O Level results were excellent and the school ranked number 5 in Tanzania.
