= Uznach Abbey =

Monastery in Uznach, Switzerland

- Interactive map of Uznach Abbey

Monastery information
- Other name: St Otmar's Abbey
- Order: Congregation of Missionary Benedictines of Saint Ottilien, Order of Saint Benedict
- Established: September 16, 1919
- Mother house: St. Ottilien Archabbey
- Dedication: St Otmar
- Diocese: Roman Catholic Diocese of Sankt Gallen

People
- Founders: Fr Adelrich Mühlebach, OSB
- Prior: Adelrich Staub (Prior Administrator)

Site
- Location: Uznach, St Gallen, Switzerland
- Coordinates: 47.2285°N 8.9860°E

St Otmar's Abbey, Uznach, Switzerland, is a monastery of the Congregation of Missionary Benedictines of Saint Ottilien. It was established in the wake of World War I to expand the Congregation's resources beyond Germany. To this day, the monastery continues to procure funds and send personnel to Benedictine missions in the Global South. The current superior of the monastic community is Fr Adelrich Staub, Prior Administrator.

== History ==
Andreas Amrhein, the founder of the Missionary Benedictines, himself grew up in Switzerland, where support of the Catholic missions was widespread. Between the time Amrhein began recruiting vocations and the outbreak of World War I, twenty Swiss compatriots had joined his young mission society. The war brought about the expulsion of nearly 70 German members of the Congregation from German East Africa, illustrating the drawbacks of having too great a focus on personnel from one country. To continue mission work, Archabbot Norbert Weber decided that it was necessary for the Missionary Benedictines to expand into non-mission lands.

On September 16, 1919, Fr Adelrich Mühlebach, a Swiss citizen and member of the Congregation, opened a mission procure in Uznach, near the eastern shores of Lake Zürich, 50 km from Zürich. Following negotiations with the British government, which now controlled what had been German East Africa, this new foundation was recognized as the "Swiss Benedictine Father". This permission allowed the Missionary Benedictines to replace some of the German members who had been expelled from Tanganyika.

For the next decades, Uznach acted primarily as a mission procure, rather than a true Benedictine monastery. The Congregation decided that a true monastic spirit should be fostered there, and in 1963, the community constructed a new monastery, dedicated to St Otmar. However, Swiss law prevented the foundation of monasteries, so the foundation remained a priory until the repeal of the relevant law in 1973. On January 6, 1982, the Congregation elevated the monastery to the status of an abbey, and Fr Ivo Auf der Maur became the first Abbot of Uznach. A new church was consecrated in 1988.

== Apostolate ==
While maintaining the lifestyle of Benedictine monks, the abbey's community continues the important work of procuring funds for the Congregation's international missions. This includes the publication of a mission periodical, which is regularly distributed to the abbey's thousands of benefactors.

Pastoral work is also a key part of the abbey's apostolate. Many of the priests help in parishes, and provide spiritual guidance to religious communities, the sick, and the elderly. Additionally, the monastery also hosts retreats and provides catechetical instruction.

The Abbey of Uznach continues to send a large number of brothers and priests to the missions of the Congregation.

== Dependencies ==
- Fribourg: A house at Fribourg, known as the "Benedictinum", was in existence from 1937 to 1963. Due to Nazi actions against the Catholic Church, it was thought prudent to found a study house in a neutral state to provide for the formation of German and Swiss clerics. Raised to the status of a conventual priory in 1947, the Fribourg house was in fact the monastic center of the Swiss community, while Uznach continued to act as procure. However, staffing both Fribourg and Uznach was a strain on monastic community. Fribourg was abandoned in order to develop Uznach into a genuine monastery.
- Osornoe, Kazakhstan: Our Lady of the Plentiful Catch Monastery was erected in Osornoe on September 29, 2006. The monastery is located in the Archdiocese of Maria Santissima in Astana. Fr Joseph Schnider is the superior of the small community that resides there.

== Personnel ==
As of May 18, 2011, the monastic community of Uznach included twenty monks in perpetual vows, around half of them ordained. Some of these monks are on assignment away from the abbey, including those at the foundation in Kazakhstan. There are also two brothers in temporal vows.

Fr Adelrich Staub was elected Prior Administrator in 2010, succeeding Marian Eleganti, Titular Bishop of Lamdia, who had been the second Abbot of Uznach (1999–2009).

== See also ==
- Congregation of Missionary Benedictines of Saint Ottilien
