= Andreas Amrhein =

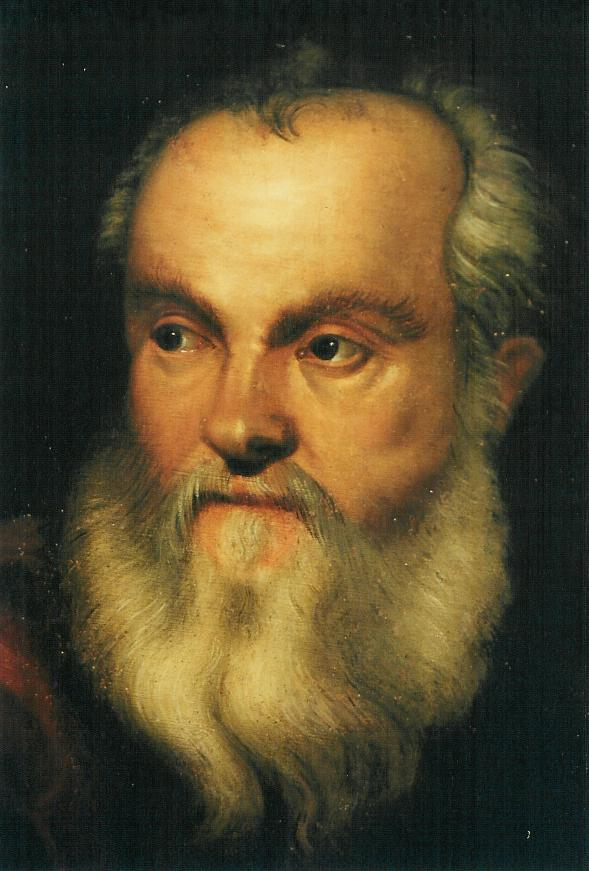
Andreas Amrhein

Andreas Amrhein, OSB was a Swiss Catholic monk who founded the Benedictine Congregation of Saint Ottilien and the Missionary Benedictine Sisters of Tutzing to combine the Benedictine way of life with activity in the mission field.

== Life ==
Joseph Amrhein was born in 1844 at Gunzwil in the canton of Lucerne, Switzerland. From childhood he suffered from poor health. At the age of ten, he expressed interest in being a missionary priest. In 1863, he took up the study of art in Florence, and in 1865 continued his studies in Paris. In 1866 he went to Karlsruhe to study painting and literature. While there he reportedly had a mystical experience which convinced him that he should enter religious life.

=== Monk ===
in 1868 at the age of 24 he began to study theology at Tubingen. Amrhein felt a drawn to become a member of a religious order, and was profoundly impressed by lectures at Tubingen on the role played during the middle ages by Saint Boniface in the spread of Christian culture. On Pentecost, 1870 he made a retreat at the Benedictine Abbey of Beuron, and six months later entered the novitiate, taking the name "Andreas".

Although he had mentioned his missionary hopes to Abbot Maurus, Amrhein soon learned that the contemplative life at Beuron did not provide for an active external apostolate. He wanted to leave before his profession but was dissuaded. The abbot apparently believed in Amrhein's monastic vocation, but not his missionary aspirations. On Christmas 1871 Amrhein professed simple perpetual vows, and on July 16, 1872, was ordained a priest. That autumn, he was sent to Beuron’s daughter-house of Maredsous.

While at Maredsous, Amrhein learned of the Silvestrines' work in Ceylon and Rosendo Salvado's mission in Australia. He also met Gerard van Caloen, who later founded the St. Andrew's Abbey, Zevenkerken specifically to train monks for the missions. On February 2, 1875, Amrhein made his solemn profession. In 1878 the two made a pilgrimage to Affligem.

Recalled to Beuron due to ill health, Amrhein served his abbey in various capacities during the hard times of the "Kulturkampf". In 1880 he was sent to Beuron’s foundation at Erdington in England to teach in the parish school. While in England he met Bishop Herbert Vaughan who was planning a missionary society. In 1826 Abbot Maurus granted Amrhein permission to spend six months with the Mill Hill Missionaries; but in following year the Abbot asked Amrhein to choose between Mill Hill and Beuron. Amrhein remained a monk at Maredsous.

In 1883 Amrhein made a pilgrimage to Rome and on the way visited in Steyl, Holland Arnold Janssen, founder of the missionary Society of the Divine Word. While in Rome Amrhein discussed with members of Propaganda Fide his idea about a missionary society based on the Rule of St. Benedict. Archbishop Jacobini, secretary of the Congregation encouraged him to return to Steyl and learn from Janssen. He also met Francis Mary of the Cross Jordan, founder of the Salvatorians, and Salvado who was visiting from Western Australia. Only Dom Salvado's group had a monastic aspect.

Amrhein then spent six months in Steyl, with Janssen, through whose good offices Amrhein had first contacted Propaganda Fide. Janssen interceded on Amrhein's behalf with Abbot Wolter. In August 1883 Amrhein was granted exclaustration by the pope, relieving him of his vow of stability to Beuron.

=== Founder ===
In November 1883 Amrhein left Steyl for Regensburg where he was offered the abandoned Reichenbach Abbey, a former Benedictine monastery. Much work was required to make the derelict building habitable. After many months he received government approval as long as he did not call the establishment an abbey. He named it the "Benedictine Society for the Foreign Missions". In June 1884, Amrhein received ecclesiastical approval to open a mission house in Reichenbach for the training of missionaries.

Inspired by the lives of saints Leoba, Thekla, and Walburga, Amrhein also made provision for a convent of nuns at Reichenbach. The entire community moved to Emming in 1887. The place was later renamed ‘Sankt Ottilien’ in honour of St Odilia to whom a local shrine was dedicated. That same year the Propaganda Fide recognized the community as a German Benedictine Congregation for Foreign Missions.

Father Amrhein governed both branches of the Congregation of St. Ottilien until his resignation from office in January 1896. Amrhein was a visionary, but not an administrator. The bishop-visitator asked Archabbot Placidus Wolter and the Beuronese Congregation to straighten out some matters at St. Ottilien. St. Ottilien's was designated a conventual priory and the Congregation accepted into the Benedictine Confederation. In 1913 the remains of Münsterschwarzach Abbey were re-acquired by the Missionary Benedictines, as St. Ottilien's first daughter house, along with the necessary land to support it.

=== Artist ===
In 1903, the publisher Benzinger of Einsiedeln commissioned a large painting of the Sacred Heart of Jesus, called "Iesus, Salvator Mundi". Amrhein signed it with the pseudonym, "Georg André". In 2012 the painting was located in the Benzinger Archives of the Fram Museum in Einsiedeln. The museum agreed to sell the painting to the Missionary Benedictine Sisters of Tutzing, a congregation founded by Amrhein. It now resides in the Casa Santo Spirito, the congregation's international generalate in Rome.

Father Andreas Amrhein died on December 29, 1927.

== See also ==
- St. Ottilien Archabbey
