= St. Paul's Abbey (New Jersey) =

Benedictine monastery in Newton, New Jersey

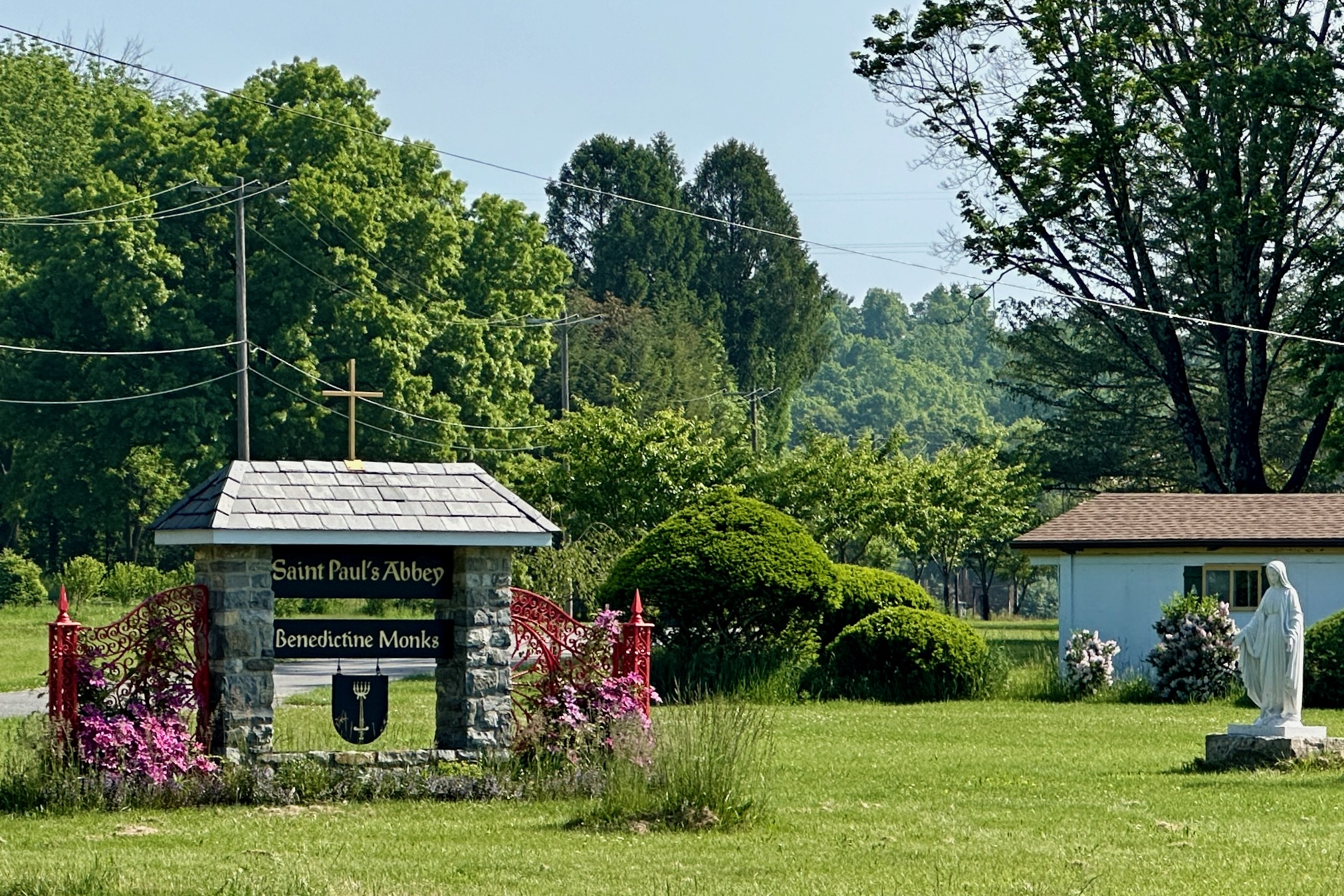
- Entrance sign

- Location within Sussex County, New Jersey Location within New Jersey Location within the United States
- Interactive map of St. Paul's Abbey

Monastery information
- Other name: Newton Abbey
- Order: Congregation of Missionary Benedictines of Saint Ottilien, Order of Saint Benedict
- Established: March 15, 1924
- Mother house: St. Ottilien Archabbey
- Dedication: St Paul

People
- Founders: Fr Michael Heinlein, OSB
- Abbot: Joel Macul*
- Prior: Simon Kim

Site
- Location: 289 U.S. Route 206, Newton, New Jersey
- Coordinates: 41°02′03″N 74°45′46″W

St. Paul's Abbey is located at 289 U.S. Route 206 in Andover Township, near Newton, in Sussex County, New Jersey. United States. It is a Benedictine simple priory of the Congregation of Missionary Benedictines of Saint Ottilien. It was founded by Father Michael Heinlein, a monk of the German Archabbey of St. Ottilien, as a monastery on March 15, 1924. Originally established as a mission procure following World War I, over time the size of the community drastically decreased. In 2002, monks from Waegwan Abbey, South Korea, took charge of the monastery (Newton II). On January 25, 2004, Newton II was elevated to the status of a simple priory. The community's superior is Fr Prior Samuel Kim.

Agricultural and community work are the two most important activities of the monastery. Growing hay and Christmas trees as well as helping in local parishes, hospital work, and a myriad of other jobs keep monks actively involved in the local community. Several monks have also served in missions in Africa.

== History ==
=== Early years of expansion ===
The effects that World War I had on the Missionary Benedictines' missions in Asia and Africa contributed to the founding of houses outside of Germany. Monasteries in a variety of areas would ensure that the Ottilien Congregation had a greater chance of continuing its work in spite of political and economic crises. Thus, by 1924, the Missionary Benedictines had begun foundations in Argentina, the Philippines, Switzerland, the United States, and Venezuela.

Fr Michael Heinlein, OSB, having been expelled by the British from what had been the colony of German East Africa, was entrusted with establishing a monastery in the United States. Heinlein was encouraged by Bishop Thomas Spreiter of Zululand, who happened to be in the United States raising funds for his diocese. Spreiter was confident that the United States could contribute both money and manpower to the Missionary Benedictine cause. Eventually, the two purchased a farm near Newton, New Jersey, approximately 100 km northwest of New York.

In 1924, a number of German Missionary Benedictines joined Heinlein at "Little Flower Mission Procure", dedicated to the recently beatified Therese of Lisieux. Despite initial setbacks, which included financial difficulties and opposition from the Ku Klux Klan, the monastery quickly grew. By 1932, a minor seminary with 15 students was operating. The community also kept busy spreading mission awareness in surrounding parishes, as well as fostering devotion to Therese of Lisieux. While some monks raised funds for the Congregation's missions, others looked after a garden, a 180 hectare farm, and a number of workshops.

With the change in Germany's political atmosphere, it became important for the monastery not only to procure funds, but also to cultivate local vocations. Thus, in 1936, Archabbot Chrysostomus Schmid elevated the procure to the status of a conventual priory. By 1940, the priory included one local priest, 13 local clerics, and six novices, many of them from the seminary. Ten years after it became a priory, Newton began sending local vocations to the missions.

On June 9, 1947, Newton was elevated to an abbey, and placed under the patronage of Paul the Apostle. Significantly, an American, Fr Charles Coriston, was chosen as the first Abbot of Newton. At this time, the community included 21 priests (12 of them Americans), three American clerics, and 14 brothers (all expatriate Germans). The community expanded so quickly that the seminary students were forced into temporary housing, as the monks occupied the seminary facilities. In 1961, construction began on a new monastery that would suffice to house approximately fifty monks.

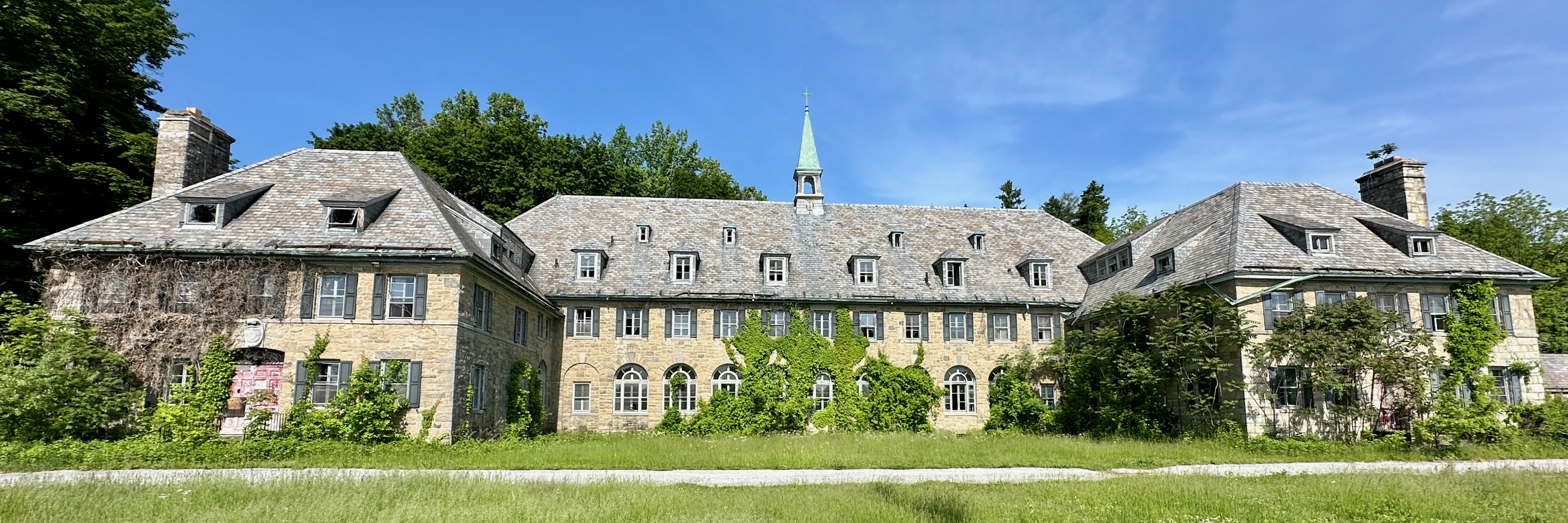
St. Paul's Abbey Norman Monastery in 2024

In 1962, the former monastery became known as the Queen of Peace Retreat House. In the late 1970s, St. Paul's Abbey ceased to operate and fell into disrepair. In 2000, the remaining monks asked for permission from the governing Ottilien Congregation to leave and start looking for new homes at other abbeys. In 2012, the former monastery was listed as St. Paul's Abbey Norman Monastery on the New Jersey Register of Historic Places. In 2024, Preservation New Jersey listed it as one of the state's top ten most endangered historic places.

=== Post-conciliar decline ===
What had been a period of spectacular growth came to a halt following the Second Vatican Council. The following demonstrates the clear drop-off in vocations:

- 1960: 48 monks
- 1970: 33 monks
- 1980: 24 monks
- 1990: 17 monks
- 2011: 14 monks

Such a crisis resulted in the closure of the seminary, as well as a decrease in the number of monks assigned to the mission. Closure of the monastery seemed inevitable, but the community was assisted by monks of Waegwan Abbey, South Korea. In December 2001, a number of these monks arrived in Newton. The monastery was officially handed over on January 25, 2002, and was elevated to the status of a simple priory, known as Newton II, on January 25, 2004. The small number of American monks who remain at Newton are governed by a special statute.

The story of one of the monks, known as "Brother Marinus", inspired Father Kim of the Waegwan Abbey in Korea to provide help in restoring the monastery.

== Apostolate ==
Because of the decrease in vocations, the work of the community is currently not as widespread as it was in times past. Agriculture, particularly the growing of Christmas trees, remains an important part of the monks' livelihood. Members of the community are also involved in retreat work, pastoral care of the sick, and the promotion of the mission apostolate.

The monastery has no dependencies.

== Personnel ==
As of May 18, 2011, the community of Newton II included fourteen monks, including six priests and one oblate. Of these fourteen, nine are Korean, four are American, and one is Tanzanian.

The community of Newton II is under the leadership of Fr Prior Samuel Kim.

== See also ==
- Congregation of Missionary Benedictines of Saint Ottilien
- Order of Saint Benedict
