= Waegwan Abbey =

Benedictine monastery in South Korea

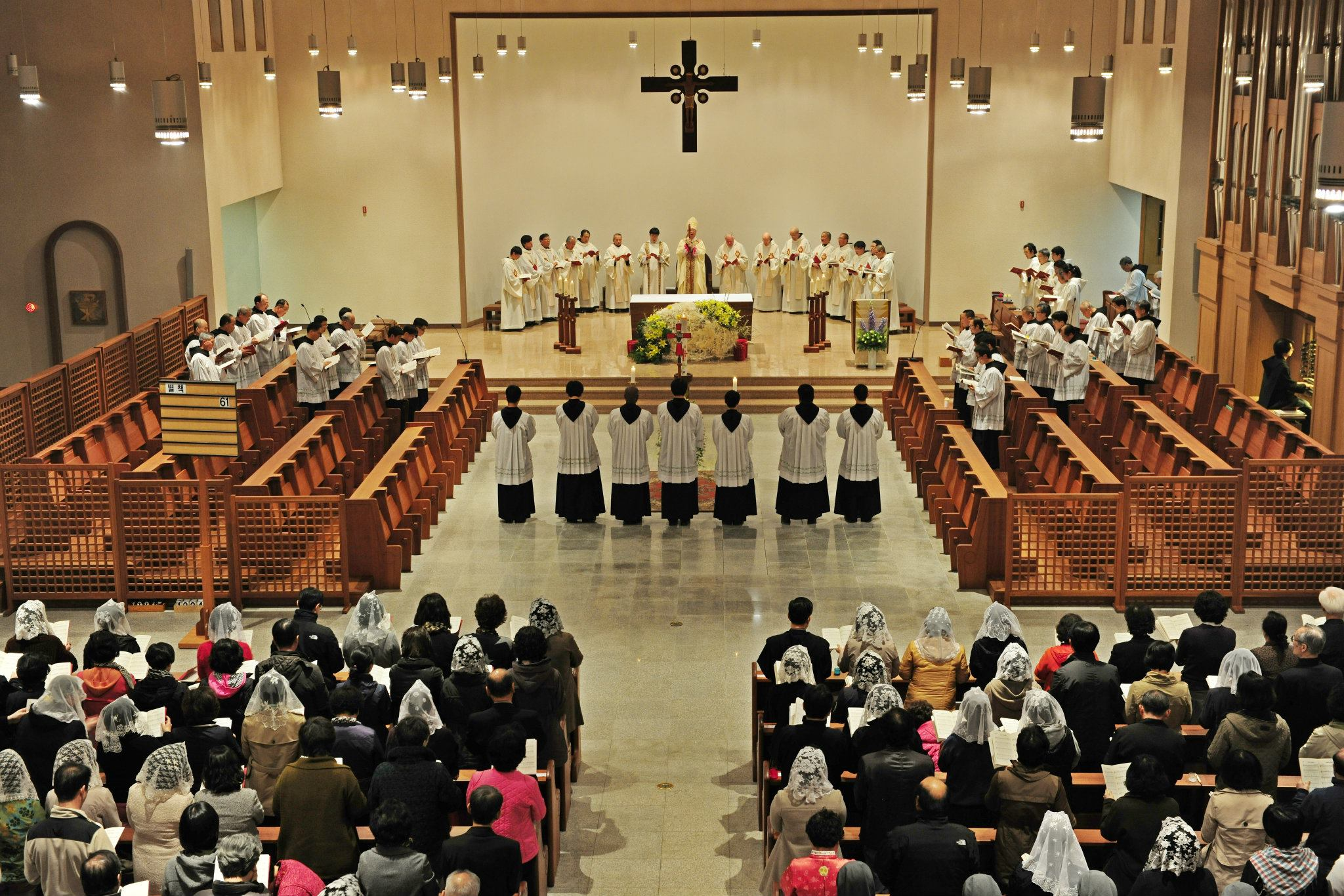
- Waegwan Abbey in 2008

- Location within South Korea
- Interactive map of Waegwan Abbey

Monastery information
- Other names: St Maurus and St Placidus Abbey
- Order: Congregation of Missionary Benedictines of Saint Ottilien, Order of Saint Benedict
- Established: 1952
- Dedication: St Maurus and St Placidus
- Diocese: Roman Catholic Archdiocese of Daegu

People
- Founders: Fr Timothy Bitterli, OSB
- Abbot: Blasio Park
- Prior: Anselmo Park

Site
- Location: Waegwan, Chilgok, North Gyeongsang, South Korea
- Coordinates: 35°59′20″N 128°24′12″E

Saint Maurus and Saint Placidus Abbey, Waegwan, Chilgok, North Gyeongsang, South Korea is a Benedictine monastery of the Congregation of Missionary Benedictines of Saint Ottilien. Established in 1952 by Korean monks who had survived the dissolution of the Territorial Abbey of Tokwon and Holy Cross Abbey in Yanji, the monastery is currently home to 131 monks. Fr Blasio Park is the current abbot.

== History ==
With the rise of Communism in China and North Korea, the monasteries of the Congregation of Missionary Benedictines of Saint Ottilien in Tokwon and Yanji were dissolved. A number of the monks — Germans, Koreans, and Swiss — were interned in labour camps, where some were executed. Twenty-six surviving Korean monks fled to South Korea. Upon hearing that they had formed a nascent monastic community in Busan, Archabbot Chrysostomus Schmid of St Ottilien ordered Fr Timothy Bitterli, a Swiss Missionary Benedictine who at the time resided at St Paul's Abbey near Newton, New Jersey, to relocate to South Korea in order to assist the community of Korean monks.

Bitterli arrived in 1952, and met the Korean monks in Daegu. Soon after, the community purchased property in Waegwan, where a monastery was completed in 1955. By this time, several German and Swiss monks who had been served at St Benedict's Abbey, Tokwon, and Holy Cross Abbey, Yanji, returned to East Asia to continue their missionary apostolate.

By 1956, the monastery had been raised to a simple priory under Bitterli's leadership. On February 17, 1964, the monastery became an abbey. At this time, Fr Odo Haas was elected the community's first abbot. During Haas' reign, dependent houses were established in Busan and in Daegu. In 1971, Haas was succeeded by Fr Placidus Ri, who thus became the first ethnically Asian superior of a Missionary Benedictine monastery. Under Abbot Placidus, a new abbey church was constructed in 1975, and the monastery's printing and publishing endeavors were expanded and modernized. Additionally, Abbot Placidus oversaw the expansion of Waegwan Abbey's foundation in Seoul, which was enlarged from a study house for clerics to include a retreat center and a branch for the Waegwan Publishing House. In 1985, monks from Waegwan were sent to the Philippines to assist the fledgling monastic community in Digos.

== Apostolic Work ==
- Printing — Since the days of Yanji and Tokwon, printing has been a major apostolate of the monks. Early on, no more than a handful of titles was printed annually. By 1990, each year an average of fifty new titles and sixty reprints were being printed. Waegwan Publishing House has published works of poetry by Kim Chi-Ha and Lee Hae In. Effort has also been directed toward producing books on the themes of social justice and human rights.
- Catechesis — In the spirit of the Missionary Benedictines, monks from Waegwan have played an important role in catechetical work. In addition to producing relevant audio-visual resources, in January 1986 the monks began a catechetical correspondence course. Within three years, the course had been completely computerized and more than 104,000 catechumens and interested Catholics had been enrolled.
- Education — The monks of Waegwan have also been involved in education. Established in 1969, a theological institute in Taegu offers a comprehensive two-year program for sisters and laypeople. Monks must pass through the institute before making profession. Sun-Sim School, Waegwan, the middle school and high school administered by the monastery since 1955, has nearly 2000 pupils, though government education policies precipitated the closure of an attached minor seminary in 1983.
- Retreats — Three different retreat facilities are directed by the Abbey of Waegwan. A large retreat house at the abbey itself serves around 2300 retreatants annually. Every year, a retreat house in Busan receives around 8000 guests. An additional retreat center exists in Seoul.
- Social Work — To assist industrial workers, the monks founded a "workers' house" in the industrial city of Kumi in 1974. Here, monks teach courses ranging from marriage-preparation and traditional Korean culture to pottery and calligraphy. Instruction on Catholic teaching on social justice and labour rights is also provided. The abbey's endeavors in carpentry and agriculture employ large numbers of laypeople.

== Dependencies ==
Many of the monks of the Abbey of Waegwan are occupied at a number of dependent monastic foundations. One of these, St Joseph's Monastery, Namyangju, was elevated to a simple priory in 1998. Another, the "Newton II" community at St Paul's Abbey, Newton, succeeded the dwindling population of the original monastery, and was elevated to a simple priory in 2004.

- St Benedict's Monastery, Seoul, Roman Catholic Archdiocese of Seoul: Founded in 1958; Fr Clemens In, superior of ten monks.
- St Joseph's Monastery, Namyangju, Roman Catholic Diocese of Uijeongbu: Founded in 1987, raised to simple priory in 1998; Fr Francis Yi, superior of ten monks.
- St Benedict's Monastery, Busan, Roman Catholic Diocese of Busan: Founded in 1967; Fr Prior Moses Tjeong, superior of six monks.
- St John the Baptist Monastery, Daegu, Roman Catholic Archdiocese of Daegu: Founded in 1969; Fr Basilio Kim Su-young, superior of two monks.
- St Benedict's Village for the Aged, Kumnam, Roman Catholic Archdiocese of Daegu: Founded in 1992; Bro Alexander Kim, superior of three monks.
- St Paul's Abbey, Newton II, Roman Catholic Diocese of Paterson: Established as a dependent community of Waegwan Abbey in 2002, raised to simple priory in 2004; Fr Prior Samuel Kim, superior of 14 monks.
- Hwasun, Archdiocese of Kwangju: Fr Romualdo Hur Song-sok, superior of five monks.

== Personnel ==
As of May 18, 2011, 111 solemnly professed monks (46 of them priests) were members of the monastic community at Waegwan. At this time, the abbey also included 17 temporally professed monks, two novices, one oblate, and ten postulants.

Abbot Fr Simon Petro Ri is the current superior of the monastic community. He was elected and confirmed on August 23, 2001, and received the abbatial blessing on September 11, 2001. Abbot Simon is the fourth Abbot of Waegwan. Abbot Simon is assisted in his duties by Fr Polycarp Kim, prior, and Bro Andrea Jeon, subprior.

=== Superiors of Waegwan ===
Name	Position	Reign
Timothy Bitterli	Prior	1951-1964
Odo Haas	1st Abbot	1964-1971
Placidus Ri	2nd Abbot	1971-1985
Martin Ri	3rd Abbot	1985-1995
Simon Ri	4th Abbot	2001–2013
Blasio Park	5th Abbot	2013–present

=== Monks of Waegwan ===
Year	No. of monks	Priests
1960	62	26
1970	92	33
1980	93	41
1990	108	44
2011	131	46

== See also ==
- Congregation of Missionary Benedictines of Saint Ottilien
- St Paul's Abbey, Newton
- Territorial Abbey of Tokwon
- Yenki Abbey
- Roman Catholicism in South Korea
- Order of Saint Benedict
