= Schwarzenbach =

Schwarzenbach may refer to:

== Places ==
=== In Austria ===
- Schwarzenbach, Lower Austria, in the Wiener Neustadt-Land district
- Schwarzenbach an der Pielach, in Lower Austria
- Schwarzenbach (Eppenstein), a part of Eppenstein in Styria
- Schwarzenbach (Sankt Veit), a part of Sankt Veit in Lower Austria
- Schwarzenbach (Opponitz), a part of in Opponitz in Lower Austria

=== In Germany ===
- Schwarzenbach an der Saale, a town in the district of Hof, Bavaria
- Schwarzenbach, Upper Palatinate, a town in the district of Neustadt (Waldnaab), Bavaria
- Schwarzenbach am Wald, a town in the district of Hof in Bavaria
- Schwarzenbach (Lindlar), a part of Lindlar in the district of Oberbergischer Kreis in North Rhine-Westphalia
- Schwarzenbach Dam reservoir in the Black Forest

=== In Switzerland ===
- Schwarzenbach, Lucerne, part of Beromünster in the canton of Lucerne
- Schwarzenbach, Berne, a part of Huttwil in the canton of Berne
- Schwarzenbach, St. Gallen, a part of Jonschwil in the canton of St Gallen
  - Schwarzenbach railway station, a former railway station in Jonschwil municipality

=== Historical ===
- Schwarzenbach, an older name of Černava in the Karlovy Vary Region, Czech Republic
- Schwarzenbach, an older name of Črna na Koroškem, a town in Slovenia

== Rivers ==
- Schwarzenbach (Obere Argen), a river in Baden-Württemberg, Germany
- Schwarzenbach (Weißach), a river in Bavaria, Germany
- Schwarzenbach (Rabnitz), a river in eastern Austria, tributary of the Danube

== People with the surname ==
- Schwarzenbach (surname)

== See also ==
- Schwarzbach (disambiguation)
- Schwerzenbach, a municipality in the canton of Zürich, Switzerland
