= Servais (surname) =

Servais is a French surname, the French version of the Latin name Servatius. Notable people with the surname include:

- Adrien-François Servais (1807–1866), Belgian cellist and composer
- Clément Servais (1862–1935), Belgian mathematician
- Ed Servais (born c. 1958), American college baseball coach
- Émile Servais (1847–1928), Luxembourgish communist politician and revolutionary
- Emmanuel Servais (1811–1890), Luxembourgish politician; Prime Minister of Luxembourg 1867–74
- Franz Servais (1880–1966), Luxembourgish writer
- Jean Servais (1910–1976), Belgian actor
- Marguerite Mongenast-Servais (1885–1925), Luxembourgish women's rights activist
- Raoul Servais (born 1928), Belgian film director
- Scott Servais (born 1967), American baseball player and coach
