= Damme Priory =

Priory in Damme, Germany

- Priorat St. Benedikt, Damme
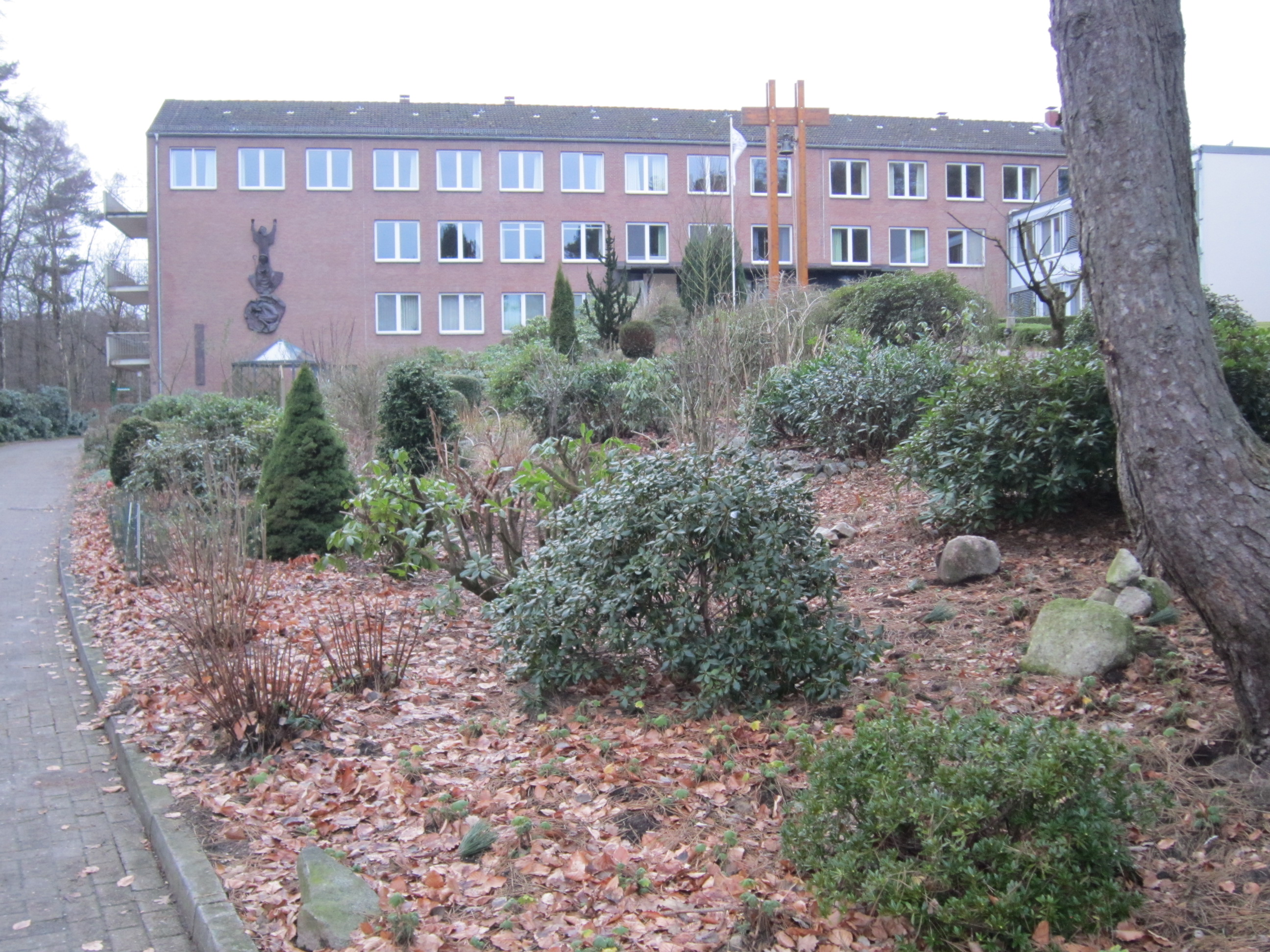
- Front side of Priorate St. Benedict in Damme (Dümmer)

- Location within Lower Saxony

Monastery information
- Order: Benedictine
- Established: December 1962
- Mother house: Münsterschwarzach Abbey

Site
- Location: Damme
- Coordinates: 52°31′47″N 8°10′37″E
- Website: Damme Priory website (in German)

Damme Priory (Priorat St. Benedikt, Damme) is a Benedictine priory dependent on Münsterschwarzach Abbey, and is situated at Kemphausen in Damme in the district of Vechta in Lower Saxony, Germany.

In December 1962 monks from Münsterschwarzach settled in Kemphausen at the farm of the Kophanke family, the last member of whom (Fräulein Maria Kophanke) wished the property to be used for monastic purposes. From 1970 to 1983 the community had a small boarding-school and now run a guest-house.

The priory belongs to the Ottilien Congregation of the Benedictine Confederation.

== Labyrinth ==
In the nearby woods is a small dry-stone labyrinth, built in 2004.

== Sources and external links ==
- Labyrinthe in Deutschland: Damme Priory labyrinth (in German)
