= Servais (given name) =

Servais is a given name of French origin, being the French version of the Latin name Servatius. See, for example:

- Servais de Condé (fl. 1561–1574), a French servant of Mary, Queen of Scots
- Servais Le Roy (1865–1953), Belgian magician, illusion designer and businessman
- Servais Knaven (born 1971), Dutch professional road bicycle racer
- Servais-Théodore Pinckaers (1925–2008), Belgian Dominican moral theologian and Catholic priest
