= Agbang Conventual Priory =

Benedictine monastery in Togo

Coordinates: 9°28′4.6618″N 1°19′15.2177″E

- Interactive map of Agbang Conventual Priory

Monastery information
- Other names: Incarnation Conventual Priory, Monastère de l’Incarnation d’Agbang
- Order: Congregation of Missionary Benedictines of Saint Ottilien, Order of Saint Benedict
- Established: 1985
- Mother house: St. Ottilien Archabbey
- Dedication: The Incarnation
- Diocese: Roman Catholic Diocese of Kara

People
- Founder: Frère Boniface Tiguila
- Prior: Bernard Anaté

Site
- Location: Agbang, Kara, Togo

Incarnation Conventual Priory, Agbang, Kara, Togo, is a Benedictine monastery of the Congregation of the Missionary Benedictines of Saint Ottilien. Established in 1985 by Frère Boniface Tiguila, the monastery is currently home to 28 monks. Conventual Prior Fr Bernard Anaté is the community's superior.

== History ==
=== Indigenous Origins ===
The monastic community of Agbang began with the initiative of Frère Boniface Tiguila, who had joined the Benedictine monastery at Dzogbegan, Togo, in 1979. Frère Boniface's experience at Dzogbegan convinced him that Benedictine monasteries in Africa must allow for Africanization. He envisaged a monastic community that was inspired by the African concepts of village and family. The community's monks would share a lifestyle that imitated the simplicity of ordinary rural people, while participating in the mission apostolate. With the support of the bishop of Sokodé, Frère Boniface left Dzogbegan in 1985 and began to recruit candidates for his ideal monastic community.

Ten young men interested in Benedictine life soon gathered around Frère Boniface. A village leader offered them 23ha of bushland in Agbang, a village 20 km from the district town of Kara. The nascent community began clearing the land, and built two simple houses, a small chapel, and a well. The community lived a simple monastic life, subsisting on their own efforts and offering hospitality to anyone who passed by.

During a visit to Germany in 1987, Frère Boniface spoke with Archabbot Notker Wolf about his goal of bringing the Benedictine life to Togo. Frère Boniface expressed his desire to affiliate his monastery with a Benedictine Congregation that was committed to the mission apostolate. Archabbot Notker was intrigued, and in May 1988 traveled with Abbot Fidelis Ruppert to Togo to inspect Frère Boniface's project in African monasticism. At Agbang, Archabbot Notker observed a young community leading a balanced life of work and prayer, in close contact with local villagers. The monks were engaged in primary evangelization of local non-Christians, while also catechizing the local Christian community. The monks of Agbang had integrated African customs and rituals into their methods of initiating candidates, welcoming guests, and celebrating feasts.

Archabbot Notker and Abbot Fidelis were convinced that Agbang should be adopted into the Congregation of Missionary Benedictines of Saint Ottilien. At the Congregation's 1988 Council, a formal decision was made committing the Missionary Benedictines to the task of accompanying the monastery of Agbang during its quest of establishing a genuinely African Benedictine community. Monks of the Congregation would be sent to Agbang to assist for short intervals.

In 1989, Frère Boniface took his temporary vows at St Ottilien. That same year, three novices made a commitment to monastic life in the form of a public promise at a ceremony in Agbang in the presence of Archabbot Notker. On November 9, 1991, the new foundation at Agbang was canonically erected. This same day, Frère Boniface professed his solemn vows.

=== Later history ===
In 1992, the Monastery of the Incarnation was raised to the status of a simple priory. Frère Boniface, by then ordained to the priesthood, became the community's first prior.

In 2004, the monastery was raised to the status of a conventual priory. On August 8, 2016, the monastery was raised to the status of Abbey, with Fr. Romain Botta elected as its first Abbot several days later.

== Dependencies ==
- St Maurus and St Placidus Monastery, Kara, Roman Catholic Diocese of Kara: Established in 1992.
- Cella St Boniface, Lomé, Roman Catholic Archdiocese of Lomé: Established in 2009.

== Personnel ==
As of May 18, 2011, 18 solemnly professed monks (4 of them priests) resided at Agbang. At this time, the community also included nine temporally professed monks and one novice.

Conventual Prior Fr Bernard Anaté is the current superior of the monastic community. Upon his election in 2010, he became the second conventual prior of Ndanda. Prior Bernard is assisted in his duties by Bro Jean de la Croix Banafai (subprior).

== See also ==
- Roman Catholicism in Togo
- Congregation of Missionary Benedictines of Saint Ottilien
