= Abbaye de l'Ascension =

Benedictine monastery in Togo

- Interactive map of Abbaye de l'Ascension

Monastery information
- Other names: Abbey of the Ascension, Dzogbégan Abbey
- Order: Subiaco Cassinese Benedictine Congregation, Order of Saint Benedict
- Established: 1961
- Dedication: The Ascension
- Diocese: Roman Catholic Diocese of Kpalimé

People
- Founder: Monks of Abbaye Saint-Benoît d'En-Calcat
- Abbot: Theodore Kouassi Coco

Site
- Location: Dzogbégan, Plateaux Region, Togo
- Coordinates: 7.238015816511714°N 0.6980900880097772°E

Abbaye de l'Ascension, Dzogbégan, Plateaux Region, Togo, is a Benedictine monastery of the Subiaco Cassinese Benedictine Congregation. Founded by French monks in 1961, the monastery was elevated to abbatial status in 1991. As of 2022, the monastery was home to thirty monks, under the leadership of Abbot Fr Theodore Kouassis Coco who is the second abbot of the monastic community.

== History ==
In 1961, monks from the Abbey of En-Calcat, France, sent a number of monks to make a foundation in Togo. The nascent community settled in what was then part of the Archdiocese of Lomé, in a village known as Danyi-Dzogbégan, located on an elevated plain some 170 km from the coast of Togo.

Within a year, monastic buildings had been completed. Soon, the community began welcoming Togolese aspirants to monastic life. Additionally, the monks of Dzogbégan opened a hospital in order to provide health care to the people of surrounding villages.

The monks quickly cleared the land around the monastery, and began to cultivate coffee and fruit. A fish pond and cattle-breeding operation were also initiated. By 1972, agricultural training and development programs sponsored by the monastic community were active in thirty villages. An agricultural training center with the specific goal of training young local farmers was established at the monastery itself.

By 1970, construction of the monastery church was completed, and the church was consecrated. Later on, a guest house was also built.

Over the years, the monastic community at Dzogbégan continued to grow and become more indigenous. In 1991, the monastery was raised to the status of an abbey. On May 29, 1993, the community elected its first Togolese abbot Fr Robert Mawulawoe Kossi Yamo. Fr Robert Mawulawoe died January 03, 2006, after thirteen years of guidance and leadership of the monastery. In 2006 the monastic community of Dzogbegan elected its second abbot, Fr Theodore Kouassi COCO. He is the current leader and superior of Abbey of Ascension monastic community.

== Apostolic work ==
Upon their arrival in Togo, the monks embarked on various agricultural endeavors. The monastic community continues to support itself through the production of coffee, marmalade, and syrup. The agricultural training programs continue, with around ten young trainees attending the monastery's agricultural training center annually.

The monks provide further outreach to local Togolese in the form of a dispensary and a guest house. The latter provides a venue for recollections, retreats, and Bible or liturgical sessions.

== Personnel ==
As of 2022, the community at Dzogbégan included thirty monks, ten of whom were ordained priests. The monks of Abbaye de l'Ascension are under the leadership of Abbot Theodore Kouassi Coco.

== See also ==
- Order of Saint Benedict
- Subiaco Congregation
- Roman Catholicism in Togo
