= Servatius =

Servatius is a given name and surname. Notable people with the name include:

== Given name ==
- Servatius of Tongeren (died 384), or Saint Servatius, Christian patron saint
- Servatius Ludwig (1907–1946), German missionary to China

== Surname ==
- Brigitte Servatius (born 1954), Austrian-American mathematician
- Darren Servatius (1966–2019), Canadian hockey player
- Robert Servatius (1894–1983), German lawyer, defender at the trial of Adolf Eichmann
- Victor Servatius, pseudonym of Dutch sexologist Frits Bernard

== See also ==
- Servaas
- Servetus
