= Ndanda Abbey =

- Location within Tanzania
- Interactive map of Ndanda Abbey

Monastery information
- Other name: Our Lady Help of Christians Abbey
- Order: Congregation of Missionary Benedictines of Saint Ottilien, Order of Saint Benedict
- Established: December 2, 1906
- Mother house: St. Ottilien Archabbey
- Dedication: Our Lady Help of Christians
- Diocese: Roman Catholic Diocese of Mtwara

People
- Abbot: Christian Temu
- Prior: Silvanus Kessy

Site
- Location: Ndanda, Mtwara, Tanzania
- Coordinates: 10°30′8″S 39°1′44″E

The Abbey of Our Lady Help of Christians, Ndanda, Tanzania, is a Benedictine monastery of the Congregation of the Missionary Benedictines of Saint Ottilien. Established in 1906 as a mission station in German East Africa, the monastery is currently home to 71 monks. On 25 March 2021 the community elected Fr. Christian Temu OSB its 6th abbot.

== History ==
=== Arrival to Africa ===
The first Missionary Benedictines arrived in German East Africa in 1887, following the creation of the Prefecture Apostolic of South Zanzibar. A first mission, established at Pugu near Dar-es-Salaam, ended in disaster, as three missionaries were killed and four kidnapped during the anti-colonial Bushiri uprising. Efforts at evangelization continued, with mission stations being opened throughout southeast German East Africa.

With the expansion of the indigenous Christian population, the territory was raised to an apostolic vicariate in 1902. However, the 1905 Maji Maji uprising dealt the Missionary Benedictines a further blow: many missionaries, including the vicariate's bishop, Cassian Spiß, were killed.

=== From mission station to abbatia nullius ===
In 1906, the missionary Benedictines chose Ndanda as the site of a new mission. Located in southern Tanzania, 100 km from the Indian Ocean, the station would serve a population previously cared for by the missions of Nyangao and Lukuledi.

In the early days of the mission, education was one of the main focuses of the Benedictines. Aided by indigenous catechists, missionaries built a number of schools throughout the area, and proceeded to instruct young boarders. This service not only endeared the missionaries to the local community, but also contributed to the growth of the Christian population.

Working in concert with the Missionary Benedictines of Saint Ottilien, the Missionary Benedictine Sisters of Tutzing endeavored to make the mission station of Ndanda a source of health care, in spite of the fact that many of the missionaries themselves succumbed to tropical diseases like malaria and black water fever. The sisters managed a dispensary and a hospital to care for the local population, created a leprosarium, and eventually established an accredited nursing school.

As the mission continued to expand, so did the Vicariate of Dar-es-Salaam. In 1913, the southern third of the area became the Prefecture Apostolic of Lindi. Following the German defeat in World War I, the British governor of Tanganyika expelled the missionary Benedictines from the area. Into the breach stepped the British White Fathers, the Swiss Capuchins, and, eventually, Swiss Benedictines, whose training had begun in Uznach in 1919. By the mid-1920s, the colonial government allowed the Germans to return.

In 1927, Lindi became an abbatia nullius, making the superior of the monastery also the ordinary of the territory. Thus, Fr Gallus Steiger, who had been part of the post-war Swiss relief, became the first Abbot of Lindi. Around this time, the personnel at Ndanda numbered 13 priests and ten brothers.

Four years after Lindi's elevation to abbatia nullius, the territory was divided into two portions: in the west, the Abbatia Nullius of Peramiho, under Abbot Gallus; in the east, the Abbatia Nullius of Ndanda, under Abbot Joachim Ammann. At the time of his abbatial blessing, the community included nine priests, 18 brothers, and ten sisters.

=== Expansion as an abbey ===
World War II brought the internment of the German missionaries at Ndanda Abbey. Swiss Capuchins again helped administer the territory in their absence. By 1946, the Germans were able to return and continue mission activity.

Cultivating indigenous vocations was a slow process. The Missionary Sisters of Tutzing began accepting local candidates for a community of African Benedictine sisters in 1939, but the war interrupted this endeavor. Likewise, Bro. Patiens Holenstein began training African brothers in 1947, but did not meet with success. However, vocations from American and British abbeys provided Ndanda with an influx of new personnel.

In 1949, Fr. Viktor Hälg succeeded Abbot Joachim as superior of the community. Two years later, Abbot-Bishop Viktor ordained Faustin Bwenje, the first indigenous priest of the Abbatia Nullius of Ndanda.

As the monastic community expanded, their territory decreased. In 1963, Rome created the Diocese of Nachingwea in the western of the abbatia nullius. The remainder of the abbatia nullius became a diocese in 1972. The new bishop, a diocesan priest, took up residence in Mtwara. With this, Abbot-Bishop Viktor reverted to being the monastic community's religious superior.

With the death of Abbot Viktor in 1975, Fr. Siegfried Hertlein became the third Abbot of Ndanda. After much discussion, the abbey finally opened a novitiate to train local monastic vocations. The first postulants were received in 1989. This development demonstrated the transition of Ndanda from being a mission station with a Benedictine orientation to being a monastery with a concern for cultivating a local Benedictine monasticism.

Abbot Father Dionys Lindenmaier served as the fourth abbot from 2002 to 2015. He was succeeded by Abbot Placid Mtunggua, the first African. At the time of his abbatial benediction, about a third of the community still consisted of European monks.

On 2 March 2021 the fifth abbot Placidus Mtunggua died from an infection with COVID-19. The former Mission Procurator of the Benedictine Congregation of Sankt Ottillien Fr. Christian Temu OSB was elected as his successor on 25 March 2021 and received the Abbatial blessing on 8 July 2021 by Bishop Titus Joseph Mdoe.

== Dependencies ==
- St Maurus Procure, Kurasini (Archdiocese of Dar-es-Salaam)
- St Benedict Parish, Sakarani (Diocese of Tanga): Purchased in 1946 as a place of relaxation for the Ndanda missionaries.

== Personnel ==
In 2011, 51 solemnly professed monks (27 of them priests) resided at Ndanda.

At the time of the election of Abbot Christian Temu in 2021 the community consisted of 92 brothers and priests.

== See also ==
- Roman Catholicism in Tanzania
- Congregation of Missionary Benedictines of Saint Ottilien
