= Servatius Ludwig =

20th-century German Christian missionary

Personal details
- Born: Otto Ludwig; June 15, 1907 Bous, German Empire
- Died: May 26, 1946 (aged 38) Sinchan, Manchuria, China
- Denomination: Christianity (Catholicism)

Servatius Ludwig (born Otto Ludwig; 15 June 1907 – 26 May 1946) was a German Catholic missionary to northeast China who became a leader of Christian missionary efforts in Manchuria until his assassination in 1946.

== Early life ==
Ludwig, whose baptismal name was Otto, was born in Bous on June 15, 1907. His parents were the railway official Peter Ludwig and his wife Angela, née Fery. He attended secondary school in Saarlouis, where he obtained his degree in March 1927. Following his desire to become a missionary, he joined the Benedictine Order in the Abbey of St. Ottilien in Bavaria, where he professed on May 12, 1927. He studied theology and philosophy in St. Ottilien and Munich. On March 23, 1933, he was ordained to priesthood.

== Manchuria ==
In August 1934 Ludwig was sent to Manchukuo, a puppet state under Japanese domination, situated in the border region between the then Japanese colony Korea, the Republic of China and the Soviet Union. After initial work on various mission stations in the area, among them Yenki Abbey, the newly founded station Sinchan was assigned to him. It was designed to attract more mission areas in Manchuria. In this poor, climatically extreme region he proselytized the partly Korean, partly Chinese population. In view of the linguistic and cultural barriers and the spreading acts of war his missionary work proved to be extremely difficult. He reported this in detail to his home abbey St. Ottilien and in his letters to his family in Germany. He described the dangers of marauding bands of robbers, the famines, the situation of the migrant workers — and also his loneliness. At the end of World War II, after the withdrawal of the Japanese troops, first the Soviets, then the Chinese occupied Manchuria. In May 1946, Ludwig was arrested as a "spy" by the Chinese Communists, interrogated and shortly after he was shot.

== Honors ==
In June 2007, in honour of his 100th birthday, the church square in his hometown Bous was named after Ludwig. There are also efforts to have him beatified.
