= Schwarzbach (surname) =

Schwarzbach (German pronunciation: [ˈʃvaʁtsˌbax]) is a German surname. Notable people with the surname include:

- Fred Schwarzbach, American academic
- Julia Schwarzbach (born 1989), German weightlifter
- Yvette Kosmann-Schwarzbach (born 1941), French mathematician
