= Territorial Abbey of Tokwon =

Monastery in modern North Korea

Coordinates: 39°11′38″N 127°22′26″E

Territorial Abbey of Tŏkwon Territorialis Abbatia Tokvonensis 천주교 덕원자치수도원구

Location
- Country: North Korea
- Ecclesiastical province: Immediately subject to the Holy See
- Metropolitan: Tokwon (near Wonsan)

Statistics
- Population: unknown
- Churches: none

Information
- Denomination: Catholic Church
- Rite: Roman Rite
- Established: 12 January 1940
- Cathedral: Tokwon Abbey of St. Benedict
- Patron saint: St. Benedict
- Secular priests: none

Current leadership
- Pope: Leo XIV
- Abbot: Apostolic Administrator Abbot Blasio Park OSB

Map
- Territorial Abbacy of Tokwon

Tokwon Abbey was a Benedictine monastery of the Congregation of Missionary Benedictines of Saint Ottilien, located near the town of Wonsan in what is now North Korea. Founded as a monastic mission in Seoul, the community transferred to Tokwon in the 1920s to take charge of the newly created Apostolic Vicariate of Wonsan. The persecution of Christians in North Korea since 1949—including the torture and murder of dozens of men and women religious—made any church activity in the abbacy impossible. However the Territorial Abbacy of Tokwon is formally still kept as one of the few remaining territorial abbeys within the Catholic Church.

== Foundation ==
In February 1909, German monks of the Congregation of Missionary Benedictines of Saint Ottilien arrived in Seoul. Following the model used in their African monasteries, lay brothers established a carpentry shop and a trade school, while priests busied themselves with pastoral work and education. With the arrival of more monks from Europe, the monastery was raised to the status of an abbey on May 15, 1913. Fr Boniface Sauer, OSB, became the community's first abbot.

When the Vicariate Apostolic of Seoul was divided in 1920, the monks of the Abbey of St Benedict took charge of the newly created Vicariate Apostolic of Wonsan. By 1927, the original monastery in Seoul was closed, the community of around forty monks having relocated to Tokwon. Between 1927 and 1928, the monks built a minor and major seminary to train indigenous secular priests, while from 1929 to 1931 a church in the neo-Romanesque style was constructed. Around this time, the community began to cultivate local monastic vocations.

In 1940, the Territorial Abbacy of Tokwon was created, covering the cities of Wonsan (where Tokwon is located) and Munchon and the counties Anbyon, Chonnae and Kowon. As Abbot of Tokwon, Boniface Sauer became the ordinary of the territorial abbacy, while at the same time he was charged with being the apostolic administrator of Hamhung apostolic vicariate. As World War II came to an end, the Abbey of Tokwon fell under the control of Soviet occupying forces. Though the monastery was for a time used to quarter soldiers, eventually monastic life was permitted to resume. By the time Soviet forces withdrew in 1949, there were around 60 monks at the Abbey of Tokwon (25 of them Korean) and around 20 sisters of the Tutzing Congregation in a monastery in nearby Wonsan.

== Martyrs ==
In May 1949 under the rule of Kim Il Sung, the North Korean Ministry of State Security occupied the monastery, arrested all monks and sisters and moved them to prisons and internment camps. In July 1950, the Abbey church of Tokwon was destroyed by American bombs. From 1949 to 1952 14 monks and two sisters were executed after harsh imprisonment and torture. During the same period, 17 monks and two sisters died of starvation, illness, hard physical labour and bad living conditions in the camps. Abbot-Bishop Boniface Sauer died on 1 February 1950, in a prison in Pyongyang, ahead of the execution of all senior monks in October 1950. In January 1954, the surviving 42 German monks and sisters were repatriated to Germany via the Trans-Siberian Railway.

In May 2007 the process began for the beatification of the 36 North Koreans from the Abbey of Tokwon martyred during the wave of anti-Christian persecution under the rule of Kim Il Sung. Now titled Servants of God, the group is known as "Abbot Bishop Boniface Sauer (O.S.B.), Fr. Benedict Kim (O.S.B.) and companions”.

== Current situation ==
The Wonsan University of Agriculture was built on the premises of the abbey. The abbey's remaining buildings (former church and seminary and former rectory) are probably in secular use by the university.

In 1952, some surviving Benedictine monks and sisters founded a new monastery in Waegwan, near the town of Daegu in South Korea. Today the abbot of Waegwan is the apostolic administrator of Tokwon Territorial Abbey, but he is not allowed to visit North Korea. Since the 1950s, there have been no priests or Catholic communities in Tokwon Territorial Abbacy or any other diocese in North Korea.

Many Christians were imprisoned in Yodok political prison camp, just 70 km (43 mi) northwest of the abbey, until its closure in 2014, and other prison camps in North Korea and subjected to torture and inhuman treatment because of their faith. Christians in North Korea can practice their faith only in secret and in constant fear of discovery and punishment.

== See also ==
- Freedom of religion in North Korea
- Order of Saint Benedict
