= Schwarzach (Main) =

River in Germany

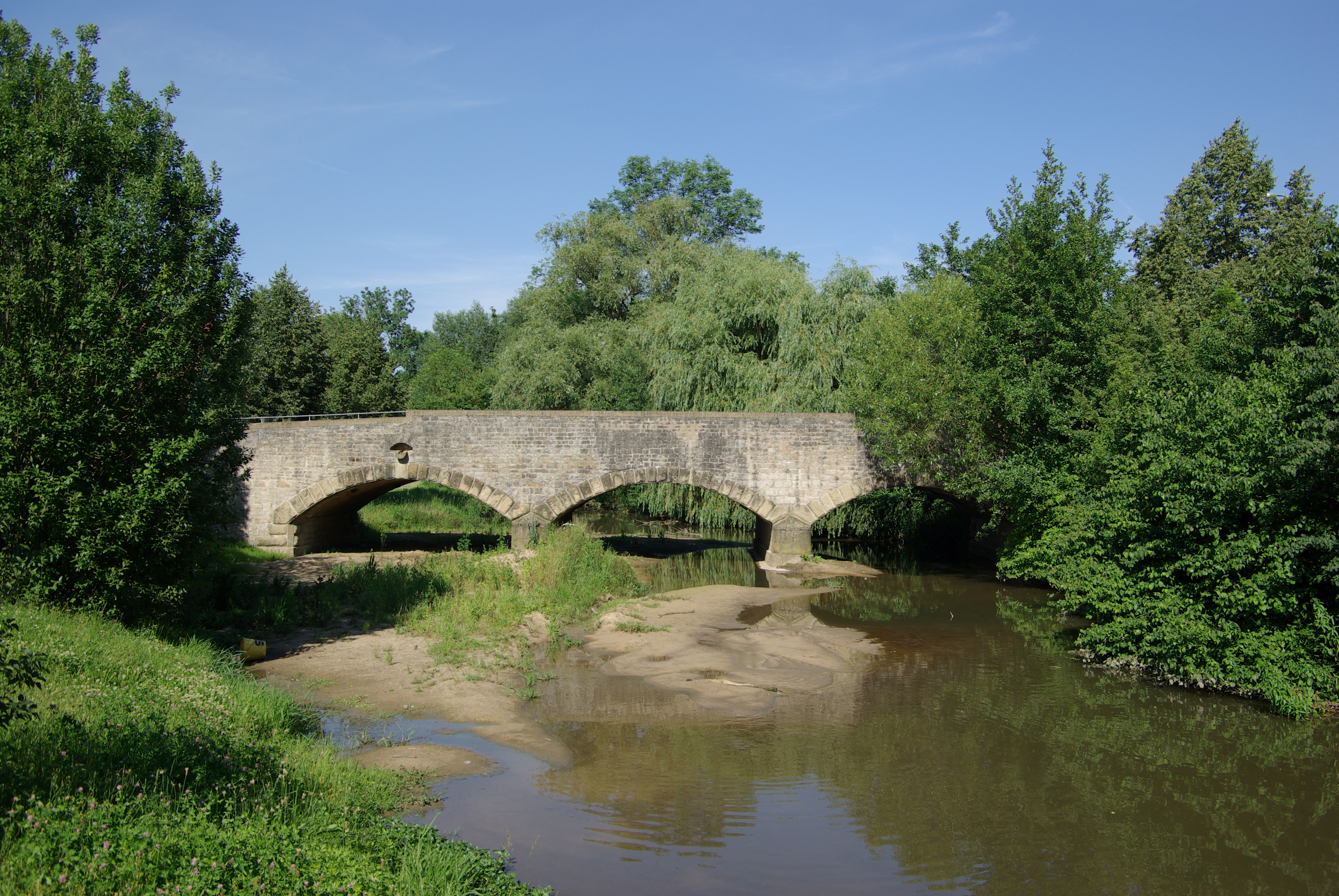

Location
- Country: Germany
- State: Bavaria

Physical characteristics
- Mouth
  - location: Main at Großheubach
  - coordinates: 49.8049°N 10.2236°E
- Length: 20.1 km (12.5 mi)

Basin features
- Progression: Main→ Rhine→ North Sea

Schwarzach (German pronunciation: [ˈʃvaʁtsax]) is a river of Bavaria, Germany. It is a left tributary of the Main in Schwarzach am Main.

== See also ==
- List of rivers of Bavaria
