= Schwarzbach (Saalach) =

River in Germany

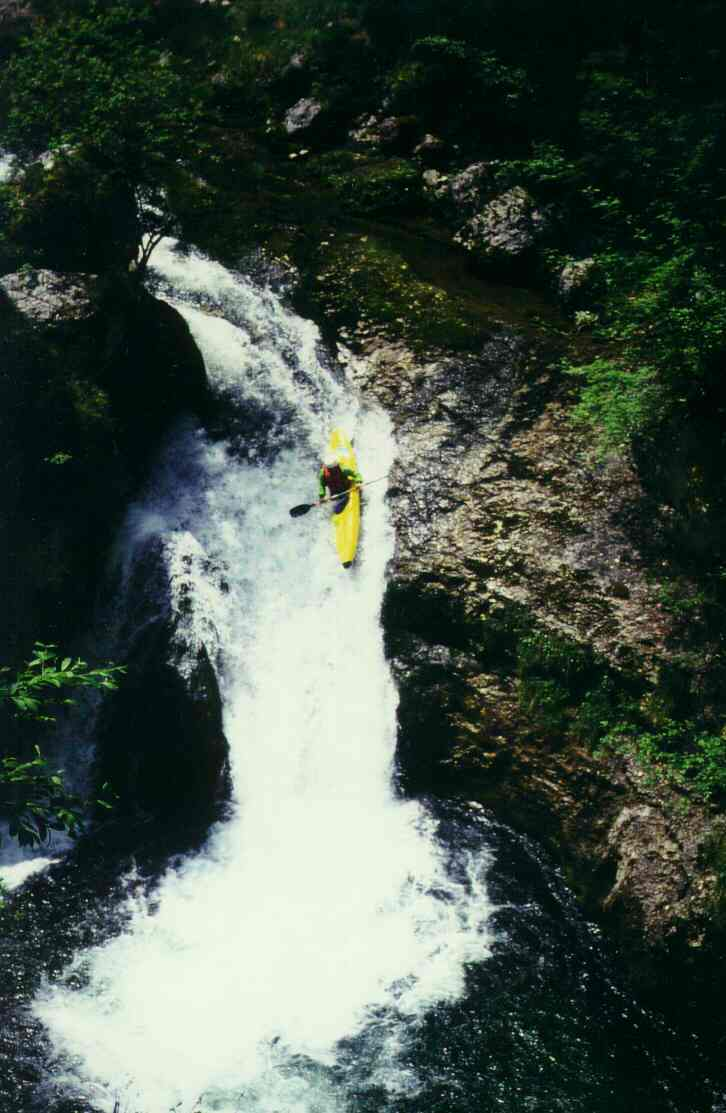

Location
- Country: Germany
- States: Bavaria

Physical characteristics
- Mouth
  - location: Saalach
  - coordinates: 47.6796°N 12.8299°E

Basin features
- Progression: Saalach→ Salzach→ Inn→ Danube→ Black Sea

Schwarzbach (German pronunciation: [ˈʃvaʁtsˌbax]) is a river of Bavaria, Germany. It is a right tributary of the Saalach near Schneizlreuth.

== See also ==
- List of rivers of Bavaria
