= Schwarzbach (Günz) =

River in Bavaria, Germany

Location
- Country: Germany
- States: Bavaria

Physical characteristics
- Mouth
  - location: Günz
  - coordinates: 48.3192°N 10.3235°E

Basin features
- Progression: Günz→ Danube→ Black Sea

Schwarzbach (German pronunciation: [ˈʃvaʁtsˌbax]; also known as Schwarzbachquellhöhle) is a river in Bavaria, Germany. It is a left tributary of the Günz near Ellzee and a right tributary of the Saalach near Schneizlreuth.

The river stretches a mere 6 kilometers in length, navigating a intricate network of waterways before it flows into the Black Sea. Its origin lies in the depths of a cave that reaches an impressive 3,120 meters, tapping into subterranean water reserves. The river's course runs alongside the rocky slopes of a mountain known as Reiter Alm.

The source cave was initially charted in 1554 by Philipp Apian, a noted German mathematician and cartographer. Subsequently, in 1968, cave diver Jochen Hasenmeier returned to this site to explore and record its precise depth.

The Schwarzbach River is characterized by its twisting channels and fast-moving waters. It serves as a popular venue adventurers and outdoor enthusiasts with annual canoeing competitions that take place along its scenic banks.

== See also ==
- List of rivers of Bavaria
