= Schwarzenbach (surname) =

Schwarzenbach is a Swiss German surname that may refer to

- Alfred Schwarzenbach (equestrian) (born 1941), Swiss Olympic equestrian
- Annemarie Schwarzenbach (1908–1942), Swiss author and journalist
- Blake Schwarzenbach (born 1967), American singer and guitarist
- Gerold Schwarzenbach (1904–1978), Swiss chemist
- Hans Schwarzenbach (1913–1993), Swiss Olympic equestrian
- James Schwarzenbach (1911–1994), Swiss politician, author and publisher
- Renée Schwarzenbach-Wille (1883–1959), Swiss photographer
- Urs Schwarzenbach (born 1948), Swiss financier
