= Saint-Servais =

Saint-Servais is the name of two communes in France:

- Saint-Servais, Côtes-d'Armor, a commune in the Côtes-d'Armor département
- Saint-Servais, Finistère, a commune in the Finistère département
- Saint-Servais, Belgium, an old commune of Wallonia, now a part of Namur

== See also ==
- Basilica of Saint Servatius (Saint-Servais)
- Saint Servatius
- Saint-Gervais, Isère
