= Benedictine Congregation of Saint Ottilien =

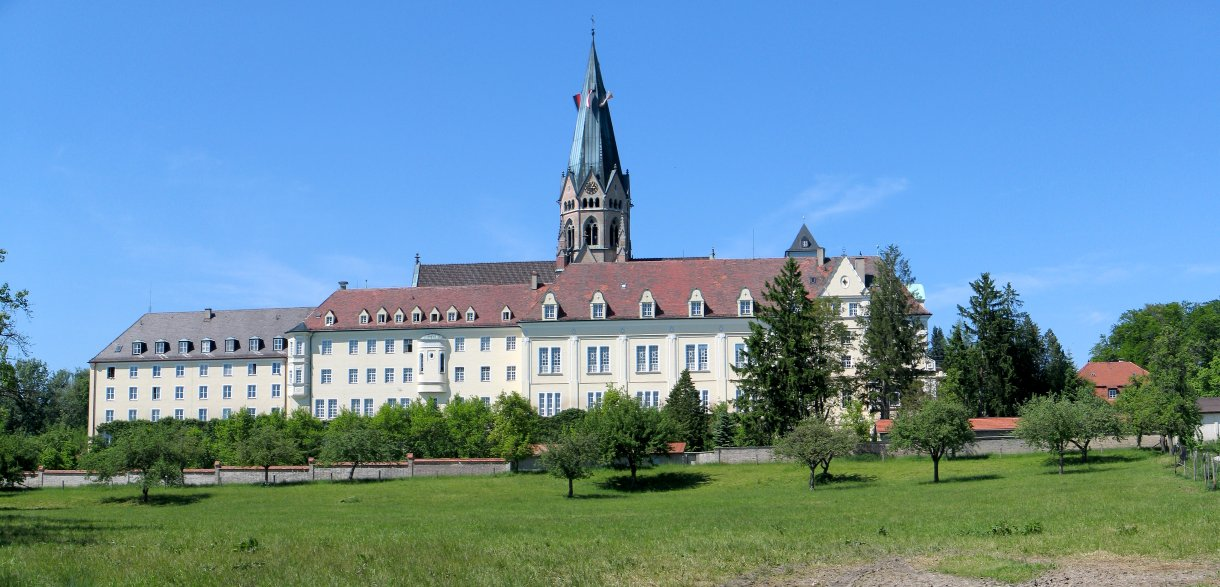
View of St. Ottilien Archabbey

The Ottilien Congregation, officially known as the Benedictine Congregation of Sankt Ottilien and as the Missionary Benedictines, is a congregation of religious houses within the Benedictine Confederation, the aim of which is to combine the Benedictine way of life with activity in the mission field.

== History ==
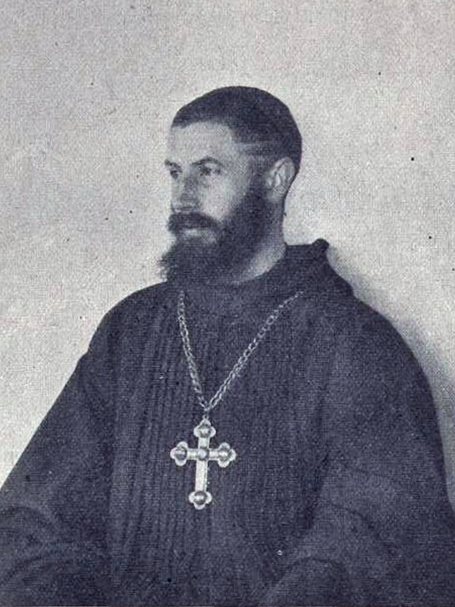
Norbert Weber (1870-1956), First Archabbot of Archabbey and Congregation of Saint Ottilien (Bavaria)

The congregation was founded in 1884, incorporating the houses founded on the vision of Andreas Amrhein, a monk of Beuron Archabbey, who, finding it impossible to realise the vision of the Benedictine mission within Beuron, left to begin an independent community. He set up a house in 1884 at Reichenbach in the Oberpfalz, but the site was too remote, and in 1887 the community moved to what is now St. Ottilien Archabbey in Oberbayern.

In the same year the first missionary monks left for the Apostolic Prefecture of South Zanzibar in German East Africa, a territory which now comprises several dioceses in Tanzania, which the monks serve from the abbeys of Peramiho, Ndanda and Hanga and several smaller houses. Similarly the Congregation's Zululand mission (begun in 1921) is now an independent monastery serving the diocese it once helped to create.

In 1908 an Asian mission field was added, comprising two abbeys in North Korea and China, which after the end of World War II were re-constituted as Waegwan Abbey in South Korea. There is also a priory at Digos on Mindanao Island in the Philippines, and a priory at Kumily in Kerala, India.

Further monasteries were established in North and South America after World War I, and more recently several new foundations have been made in Uganda, Togo, Cuba, Egypt. Until 2012, the Archabbot of St. Ottilien was the ex officio president of the congregation. Since 2012 the president is elected by the General Chapter. As of January 17, 2025, the Abbot President is Javier Aparacio, O.S.B.

Women religious have formed part of the Missionary Benedictine enterprise from the beginning, based at first at St. Ottilien but shortly after at their own house nearby. They have developed independently and today form the Congregation of Missionary Benedictine Sisters of Tutzing.

== Demographics ==
As a Congregation founded with the purpose of evangelizing German East Africa, it is no great surprise that the vast majority of early monks were Germans. As the Church grew in Africa and Asia, the Missionary Benedictines eventually began to accept indigenous vocations. In 2024, the 1021 monks of the Congregation belong to 25 communities in Africa (58%), Asia (16%), the Americas (2%) and Europe (24%). At this time the Congregation features three houses with monastic populations in excess of one hundred monks:

- Hanga (125)
- Waegwan (114)
- Mvimwa (100)

== List of member houses and dependencies ==
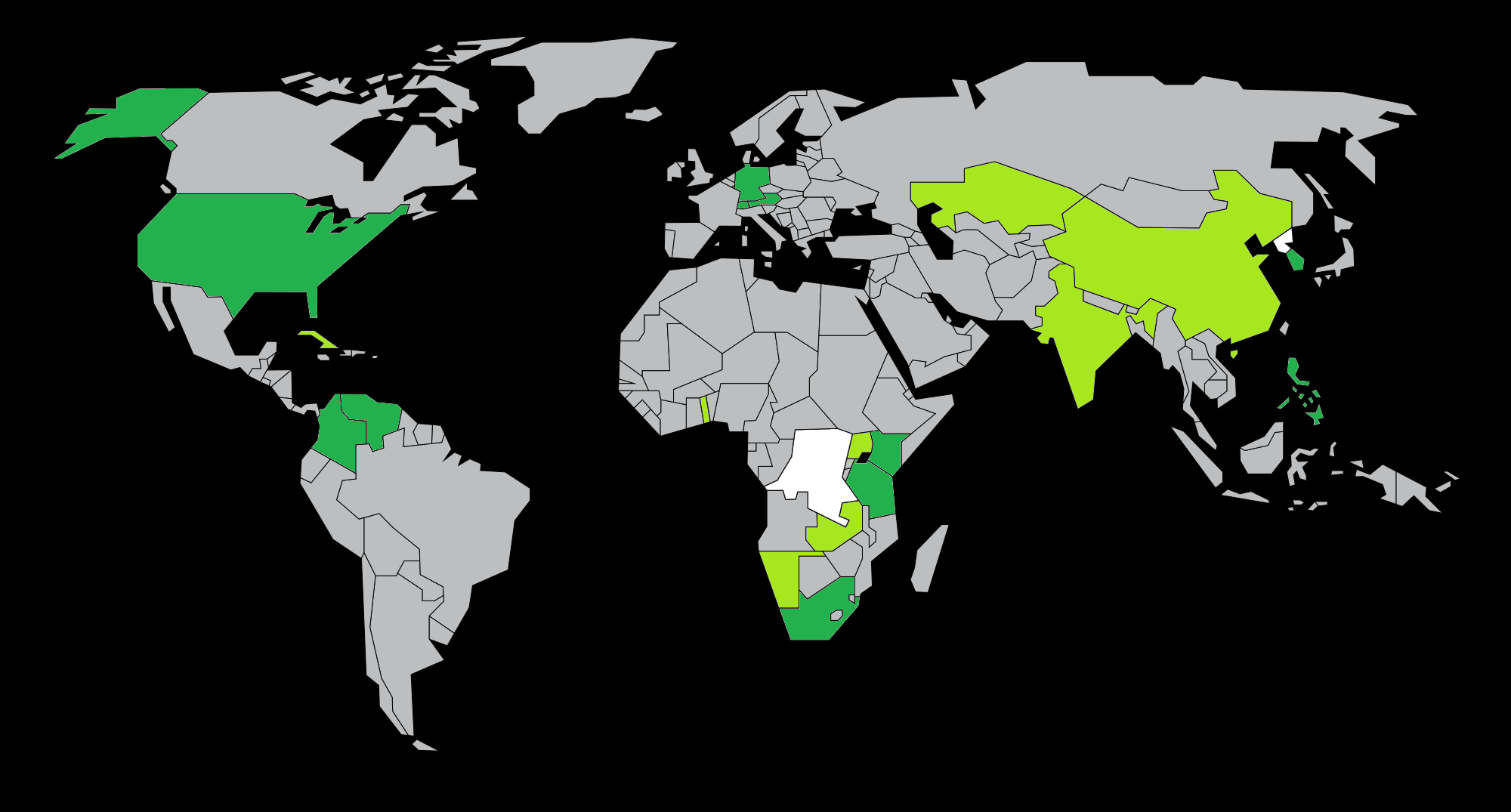
Locations of independent (green), dependent (light green), and historic (white) monasteries of the Congregation of Missionary Benedictines of Saint Ottilien

=== Europe ===
- Germany:
  - Sacred Heart Archabbey, St Ottilien (1887)
    - Monastery of the Holy Redeemer, Monte Irago, Spain
  - St Felicity's Abbey, Münsterschwarzach
    - Christ the King Priory, Schuyler, United States
    - Damme Priory, Germany
  - Holy Trinity Abbey, Schweiklberg
  - Königsmünster Abbey, Meschede
    - St Benedict's Cella, Hanover
- Austria:
  - St George's Abbey, Stans
- Switzerland:
  - St Otmar's Abbey, Uznach

=== Africa ===
- Kenya:
  - Prince of Peace Abbey, Tigoni
    - St Benedict's Monastery, Nairobi
    - Our Lady Queen of the World Monastery, Nanyuki
    - Monastery of Peter the Fisherman, Illeret
  - St Gregory's Study House, Langata (Congregation)
- South Africa:
  - Sacred Heart Abbey, Inkamana
- Tanzania:
  - St Maurus and St Placidus Abbey, Hanga
    - St John Bosco Formation House, Nakagugu
    - St Joseph's Farm, Nole
    - St Placidus Procure, Dar-es-Salaam
    - St Bernard's Priory, Kipalapala
    - St Benedict's Monastery, Mbeya
  - Holy Spirit Abbey, Mvimwa
    - St Benedict's Monastery, Sumbawanga
    - St Bernard's Monastery, Kipili
    - St Benedict's Monastery, Pugu
  - Our Lady Help of Christians Abbey, Ndanda
    - St Maurus Procure, Kurasini
    - St Benedict Parish, Sakarani
  - St Benedict's Abbey, Peramiho
    - St Raphael's Priory, Uwemba
- Togo:
  - Incarnation Conventual Priory, Agbang
    - St Maurus and St Placidus Monastery, Kara
    - Cella St Boniface, Lomé
- Uganda:
  - Christ the King Priory, Tororo
- Zambia
    - St Teresia of Lisieux Priory, Katibunga,

=== Asia ===
- China (People's Republic):
  - Holy Cross Abbey Yanji (suppressed in 1946)
    - Holy Cross Monastery, Kouqian
- India:
  - St Michael's Priory, Kumily
- Korea:
  - St Benedict's Territorial Abbey, Tokwon (1909-1949)
  - St Maurus and St Placidus Abbey, Waegwan
    - St Benedict's Monastery, Seoul
    - St Benedict's Monastery, Busan
    - St Benedict's Village for the Aged, Kumnam
    - St Paul's Abbey, Newton II
    - St Benedict's Monastery, , Hwasun
  - St Joseph's Monastery, Namyangju
- Philippines:
  - St Benedict's Conventual Priory, Digos
    - St Anselm's Study House, Davao
    - St. Scholastica's Priory, Manila

=== America ===
- Colombia:
  - St Benedict's Conventual Priory, El Rosal
- Cuba:
  - Priory of the Epiphany of the Lord, Havana (Congregation)
- United States:
  - St Paul's Abbey, Newton, New Jersey
- Venezuela:
  - St Joseph's Abbey, Güigüe
