= Schwarzbach (Emscher) =

River in North Rhine-Westphalia, Germany

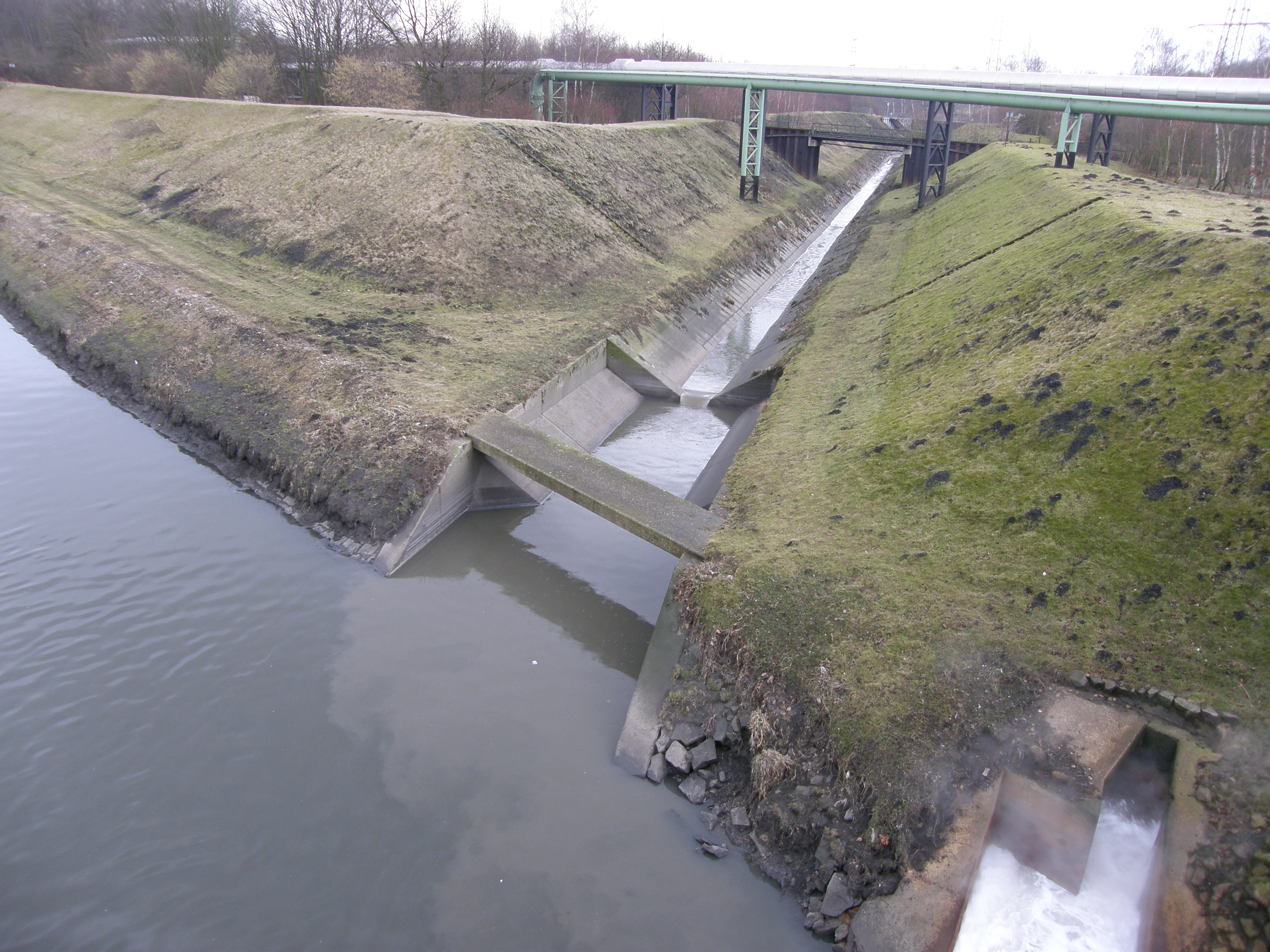

Location
- Country: Germany
- State: North Rhine-Westphalia

Physical characteristics
- Source
  - elevation: 104 m (341 ft)
- Mouth
  - location: Emscher near Gelsenkirchen
  - coordinates: 51.5193°N 7.0223°E
  - elevation: 34 m (112 ft)
- Length: 13.1 km (8.1 mi)
- Basin size: 49.006 km^{2} (18.921 sq mi)

Basin features
- Progression: Emscher→ Rhine→ North Sea

Schwarzbach (German pronunciation: [ˈʃvaʁtsˌbax]) is a river of North Rhine-Westphalia, Germany. It is a left tributary of the Emscher.

== See also ==
- List of rivers of North Rhine-Westphalia
