= Schwarzach am Main =

- Municipality
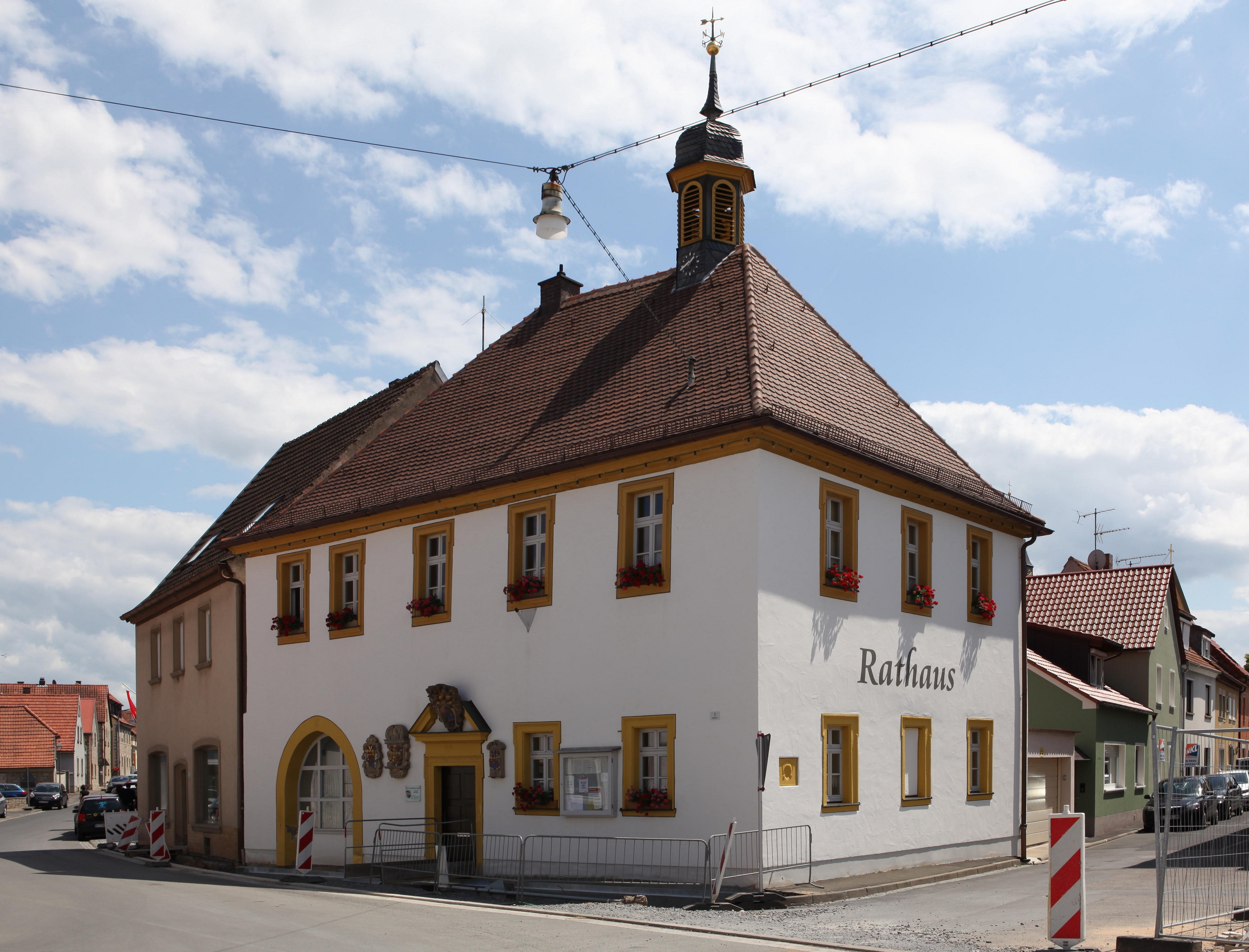
- Town hall

- Coat of arms

- Location of Schwarzach am Main within Kitzingen district
- Interactive map of Schwarzach am Main
- Location within Germany Location within Bavaria
- Coordinates: 49°48′N 10°14′E
- Country: Germany
- State: Bavaria
- Admin. region: Unterfranken
- District: Kitzingen
- Subdivisions: 6 Ortsteile

Government
  - Mayor (2020–26): Volker Schmitt

Area
  - Total: 21.11 km^{2} (8.15 sq mi)
- Elevation: 190–205 m (623–673 ft)

Population (2025-12-31)
  - Total: 3,659
  - Density: 173.3/km^{2} (448.9/sq mi)
- Time zone: UTC+01:00 (CET)
  - Summer (DST): UTC+02:00 (CEST)
- Postal codes: 97358, 97359
- Dialling codes: 09324 09325 Ortsteil Düllstadt
- Vehicle registration: KT
- Website: www.schwarzach-main.de

Schwarzach am Main (German pronunciation: [ˈʃvaʁtsax ʔam ˈmaɪn], lit. 'Neustadt on the Main') is a market town and municipality in the district of Kitzingen in Bavaria in Germany. It lies on the river Main.
