= Dependency (religion) =

A dependency, among monastic orders, denotes the relation of a monastic community with a newer community that it has founded elsewhere. The term 'dependency' can also be used as such for the subordinate institution itself ("Convent A is a dependency of Convent B"). The relationship is that of the founding abbey or conventual priory, termed the motherhouse, with a monastery composed of the monks or nuns of the new community, which is called the daughter house. In that situation, the abbot or abbess (or prior or prioress in those monastic congregations which do not have abbots or abbesses) remains the ultimate authority for the affairs of the dependent priory, which is considered an extension of the founding house. This relationship will end at such time as the new community becomes fully autonomous in its own right.

== Bonds ==
Monasteries of nuns can make a bond with a monastery of monks or friars, preferably within the same congregation or order, whereby the two are affiliated, and the fathers guarantee pastoral care to the nuns. In this sense, the women's house is considered a dependency on that of the men for spiritual direction. For all other matters, however, the nuns of the daughter monastery remain dependencies of the founding monastery of nuns which established them, until they become autonomous.

== Relationships of responsibilities ==
An extension of this is the relationship of responsibility for providing pastoral care to parishes in the surrounding region which is assumed by an abbey or priory. In the Middle Ages, many parishes would be given to Benedictine monasteries by local lords and bishops, to provide the income of the parish as a means of support for the monastery. In turn, the monks would take on this responsibility for their dependent churches, either with their own monks or by providing the salary for a secular priest who served as their vicar for the parish. Unlike the monks, who gradually took on the practice, this relationship has been a distinguishing feature of houses of canons regular, as part of the primacy of the priesthood in their way of life. In Eastern Christianity, this relationship is called the metochion.
