= History of Wuhan =

History of city in Hubei, China

The prefecture-level city of Wuhan, the capital city of Hubei province, China, has a long and rich history that dates back over 3,500 years. Starting out from the Shang dynasty-era archaeological site at Panlongcheng associated with Erligang culture, the region would become part of the E state and Chu state during the Zhou dynasty. The region evolved into an important port on the middle reaches of the Yangtze River, and the cities of Hanyang, Hankou and Wuchang were united into the city of Wuhan in 1926. Wuhan briefly serving as the capital city of China in 1927 and in 1937. Modern-day Wuhan is known as 'China's Thoroughfare' (九省通衢) due to its status as a major transportation hub, with dozens of railways, roads and expressways passing through the city and connecting to other major cities.

== Antiquity ==
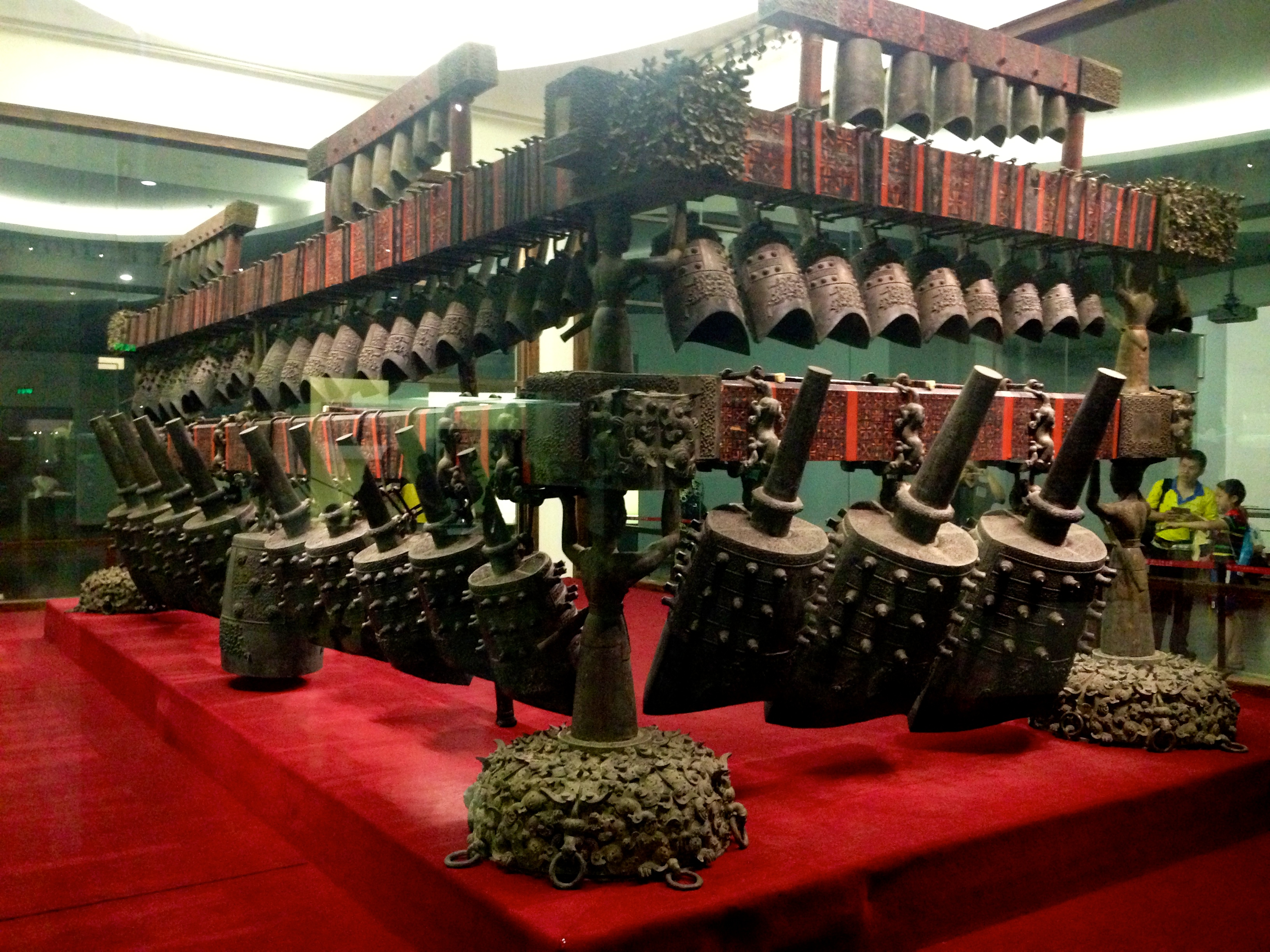
Bianzhong of Marquis Yi of Zeng, made in 433 B.C., now on display at the Hubei Provincial Museum in Wuhan

With a 3,500-year-long history, Wuhan is one of the most ancient and civilized metropolitan cities in China. Panlongcheng, an archaeological site associated with the Erligang culture, is located in modern-day Huangpi District. During the Western Zhou, the E state controlled the present-day Wuchang area south of the Yangtze River. After the conquest of the E state, the present-day Wuhan area was controlled by the Chu state for the rest of the Western Zhou and Eastern Zhou periods.

== Early Imperial China ==
During the Han dynasty, Hanyang became a fairly busy port. The Battle of Xiakou in AD 203 and Battle of Jiangxia five years later were fought over control of Jiangxia Commandery (present-day eastern Hubei). In the winter of 208/9, one of the most famous battles in Chinese history and a central event in the Romance of the Three Kingdoms—the Battle of Red Cliffs—took place in the vicinity of the cliffs near Wuhan. Around that time, walls were built to protect Hanyang (AD 206) and Wuchang (AD 223). The latter event marks the foundation of Wuhan. In AD 223, the Yellow Crane Tower (黄鹤楼), one of the Four Great Towers of China, was constructed on the Wuchang side of the Yangtze River by order of Sun Quan, leader of the Eastern Wu.

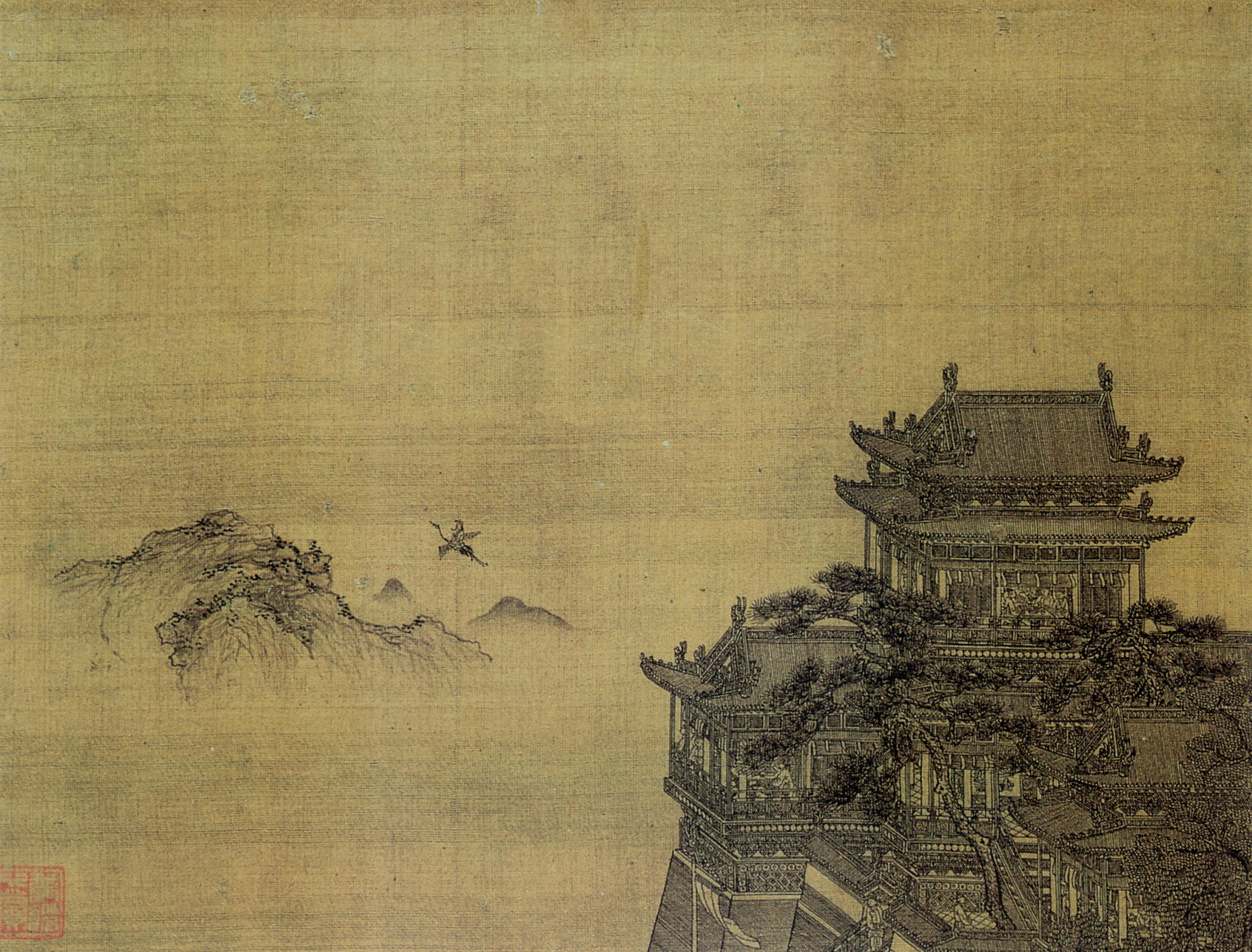
Depiction of the Yellow Crane Tower

Due to tensions between the Eastern Wu and Cao Wei states, in the autumn of 228, (Note: Man Chong's biography in the Sanguozhi mentioned that these events took place in the 3rd year of the Taihe era (227–233) of Cao Rui's reign, i.e., the year 229. This is a mistake. It was actually in the 2nd year of the Taihe era, i.e., the year 228, according to the Zizhi Tongjian.) Cao Rui, grandson of Cao Cao and the second emperor of the state of Cao Wei, ordered the general Man Chong to lead troops to Xiakou (夏口; in present-day Wuhan).

In 279, Wang Jun wrote a memorial to Emperor Wu, requesting that he order a military campaign against Eastern Wu. The emperor agreed, appointed Wang Jun as Prancing Dragon General (龍驤將軍) and ordered him to lead troops from Yi Province's capital, Chengdu, to invade Eastern Wu. Wang Jun and his army conquered strategic locations in Wu territory such as Xiling (西陵; in present-day Yichang, Hubei), Xiakou (夏口; present-day Hankou) and Wuchang (武昌; present-day Ezhou, Hubei). When the Jin invasion forces reached the Wu capital Jianye, the last Wu emperor Sun Hao surrendered, thus bringing an end to the conquest of Wu.

During the Northern and Southern dynasties period, the Wuhan area was part of the successive Southern dynasty states Liu Song (420–479), Southern Qi (479–502), Liang, and Western Liang.

In fall 550, Hou Jing sent Ren Yue to attack both Xiao Daxin and Xiao Fan's son Xiao Si (蕭嗣). Ren killed Xiao Si in battle, and Xiao Daxin, unable to resist, surrendered, allowing Hou to take his domain under control. Meanwhile, Xiao Guan, who had by now settled at Jiangxia (江夏, in modern Wuhan), was planning to attack Hou, but this drew Xiao Yi's ire—believing that Xiao Guan was intending to contend for the throne—and he sent Wang to attack Xiao Guan. Xiao Guan, not willing to engage Wang, abandoned Jiangxia and fled to Ru'nan (汝南, in modern Jingmen, Hubei), where he entered into an alliance with Eastern Wei's successor state Northern Qi (with Gao Cheng's brother Gao Yang having seized the throne in summer 550) and was created the Prince of Liang as well. Meanwhile, Hou made Emperor Jianwen create him the Prince of Han.

In summer 567, Chen Xu commissioned Wu Mingche as the governor of Xiang Province and had him command a major part of the troops against Hua, along with Chunyu Liang (淳于量). The opposing sides met at Dunkou (沌口, in modern Wuhan). Wu and Chunyu were able to ram Hua's, Northern Zhou's, and Western Liang's fleets, causing them to collapse. Hua and the Northern Zhou general Yuwen Zhi (宇文直) were forced to flee to Western Liang's capital Jiangling. In light of the victory, Wu first captured Western Liang's Hedong Commandery (河東, part of modern Jingzhou), and then further put Jiangling under siege. Western Liang's Emperor Ming was forced to flee to the subsidiary fort of Ji'nan (紀南, near Jiangling).

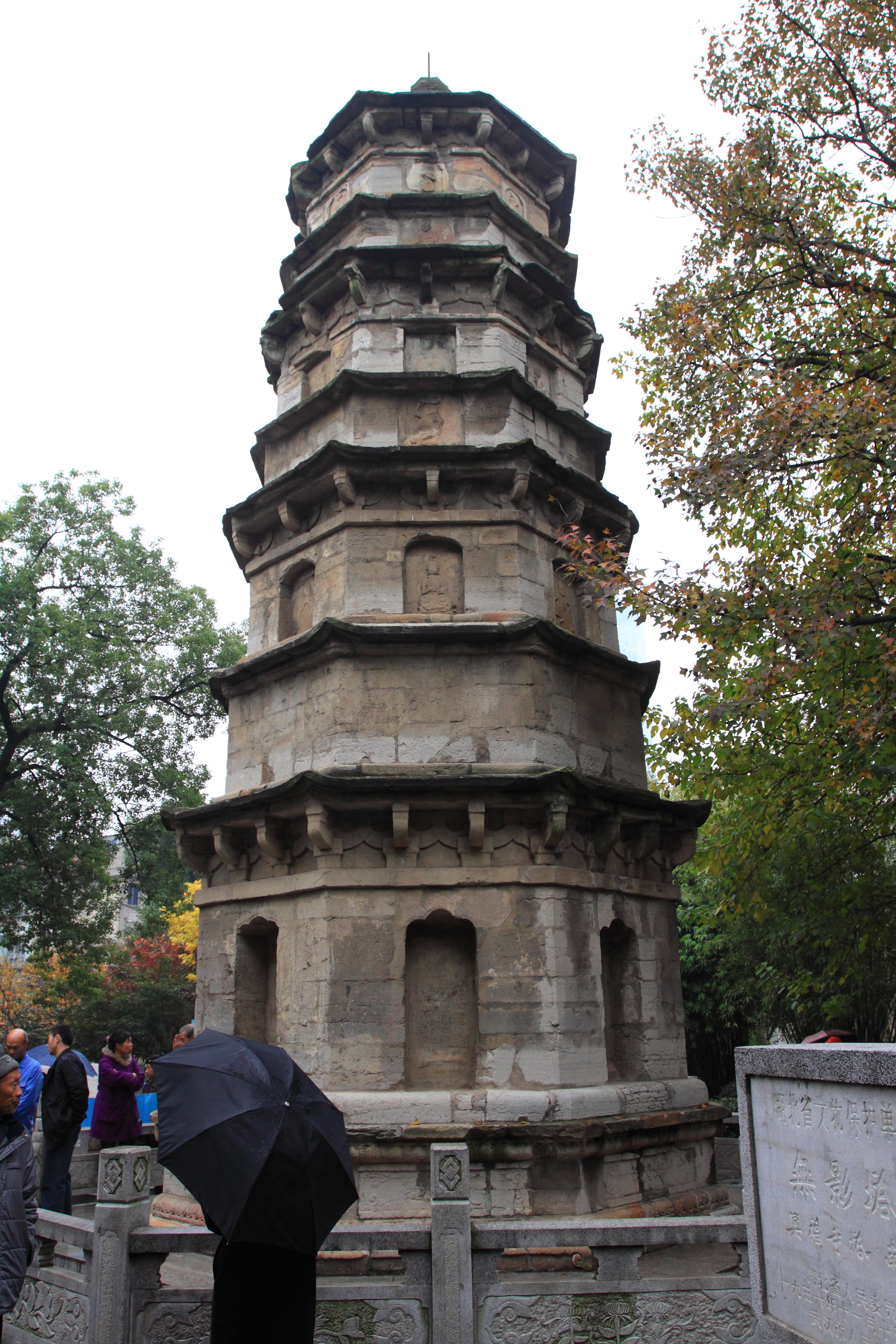
Wuying Pagoda, a Buddhist pagoda rebuilt in Wuchang during the Southern Song dynasty.

The city has long been renowned as a center for the arts (especially poetry) and for intellectual studies. Cui Hao, a celebrated poet of the Tang dynasty, visited the building in the early 8th century; his poem made it the most celebrated building in southern China.

In spring 877, Wang Xianzhi captured E Prefecture (鄂州, in modern Wuhan). He then returned north, joining forces with Huang again, and they surrounded Song Wei at Song Prefecture (宋州, in modern Shangqiu, Henan). Only after the imperial general Zhang Zimian (張自勉) came to Song Wei's aid did the agrarian rebels release their hold on Song Wei. Wang Xianzhi then headed south, successively capturing An Prefecture (安州, in modern Xiaogan, Hubei) and Sui Prefecture (隨州, in modern Suizhou, Hubei), before further raiding Fu (復州, in modern Tianmen, Hubei) and Ying (郢州, in modern Jingmen, Hubei).

In winter 877, Huang Chao pillaged Qi and Huang (黃州, in modern Wuhan) Prefectures. The Tang general Zeng Yuanyu (曾元裕) defeated him, however, and he fled. In 894, Wu Tao (吳討) the prefect of Huang Prefecture (黃州, modern Wuhan), who was under Du Hong the military governor of Wuchang Circuit (武昌, headquartered in modern Wuhan), offered to submit to Yang Xingmi. In response, Du put Huang Circuit under siege. Yang sent Zhu to aid Wu. When another subordinate of Du's, Feng Jingzhang (馮敬章) the prefect of Qi Prefecture (蘄州, in modern Huanggang, Hubei) tried to intercept Zhu, Zhu put Qi Prefecture under siege but was initially unable to capture it. However, it appeared that subsequently, after Wu evacuated Huang Prefecture, Yang's forces were nevertheless able to hold it.

Before Kublai Khan arrived in 1259, word reached him that Möngke had died. Kublai decided to keep the death of his brother secret and continued the attack on Wuhan, near the Yangtze. While Kublai's force besieged Wuchang, Uryankhadai joined him. The present-day Wuying Pagoda was constructed at the end of the Song dynasty between attacks by the Mongolian forces. Under the Mongol rulers (Yuan dynasty), Wuchang was promoted to the status of provincial capital.

== Qing dynasty ==
=== Opening Hankou as a trading port ===
By the dawn of the 18th century, Hankou had become one of China's top four most important towns of trade. In the late 19th century, railroads were extended on a north–south axis through the city, making Wuhan an important transshipment point between rail and river traffic. Also during this period foreign powers extracted mercantile concessions, with the riverfront of Hankou being divided up into foreign-controlled merchant districts. These districts contained trading firm offices, warehouses, and docking facilities. The French had a concession in Hankou.

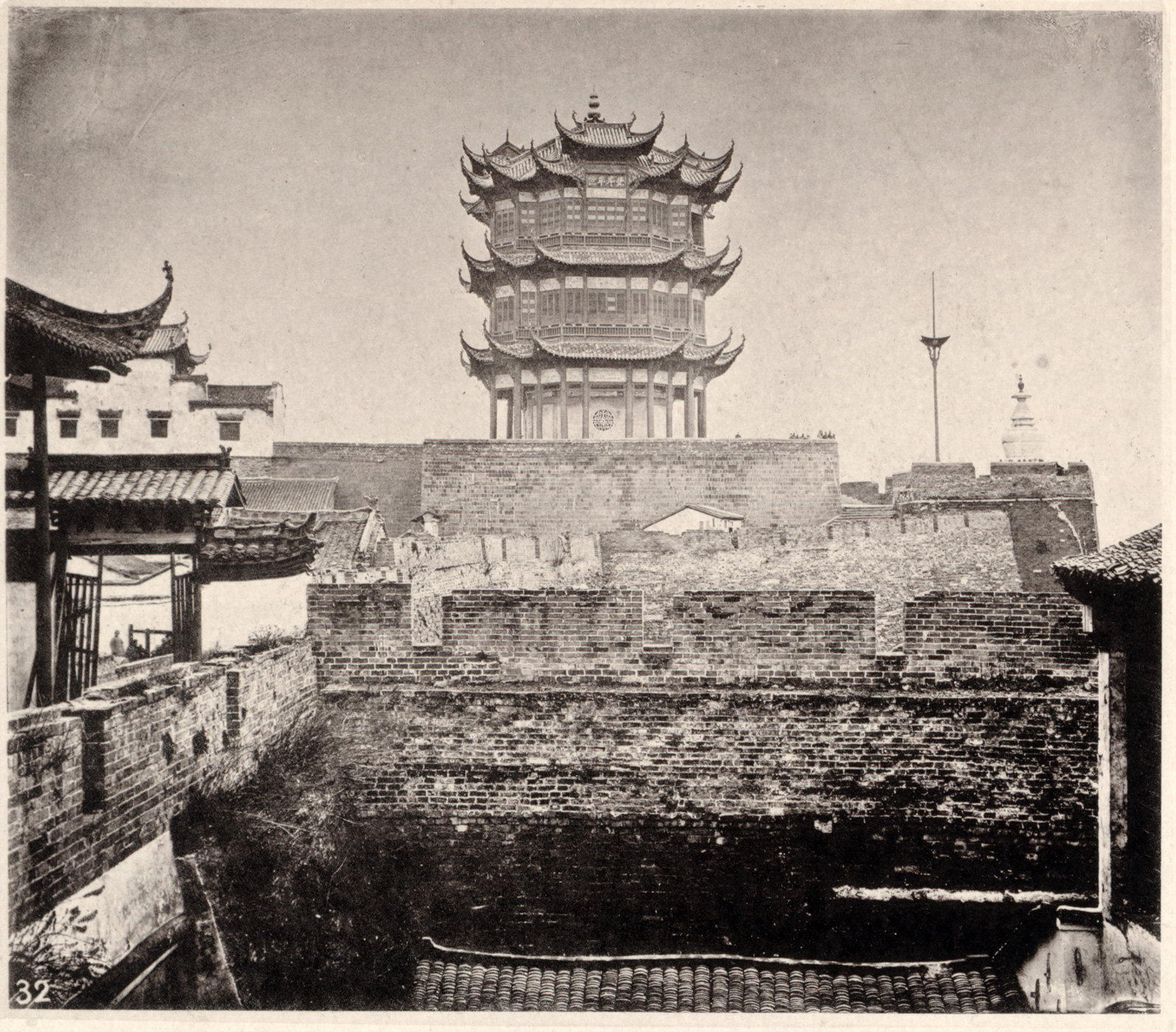
The Yellow Crane Tower in 1871

The forces of the Taiping Rebellion captured the Wuhan area in following the Battle of Wuchang in late 1852 and continued to hold the area and much of the lower Yangtze River region until the Heavenly Kingdom's defeat in 1864. Both urban and rural areas suffered severe damage as a result of constant fighting.

During the Second Opium War (known in the West as the Arrow War, 1856–1860), the government of the Qing dynasty was defeated by the western powers and signed the Treaties of Tianjin and the Convention of Peking, which stipulated eleven cities or regions (including Hankou) as trading ports. In December 1858, James Bruce, 8th Earl of Elgin, High Commissioner to China, led four warships up the Yangtze River in Wuhan to collect the information needed for opening the trading port in Wuhan. And in the spring of 1861, Counselor Harry Parkes and Admiral Herbert were sent to Wuhan to open a trading port. On the basis of the Convention of Peking, Harry Parkes concluded the Hankou Lend-Lease Treaty with Guan Wen, the governor-general of Hunan and Hubei. It brought an area of 30.53 square kilometres (11.79 sq mi) along the Yangtze River (from Jianghan Road to Hezuo Road today) to become a British Concession and permitted Britain to set up its consulate in the concession. Thus, Hankou became an open trading port.

=== Hubei under Zhang Zhidong ===
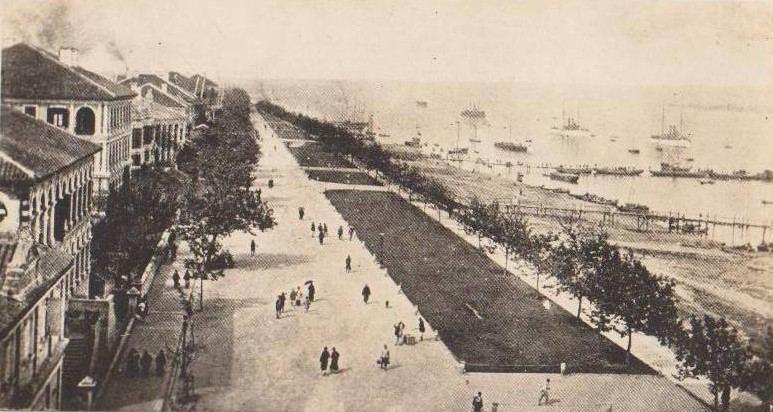
Foreign concessions along the Hankow Bund c. 1900.

In 1889, Zhang Zhidong was transferred from Viceroy of Liangguang (Guangdong and Guangxi provinces) to Viceroy of Huguang (Hunan and Hubei provinces). He governed the province for 18 years, until 1907. During this period, he elucidated the theory of "Chinese learning as the basis, Western learning for application," known as the ti-yong ideal. He set up many heavy industries, founded Hanyang Steel Plant, Daye Iron Mine, Pingxiang Coal Mine and Hubei Arsenal and set up local textile industries, boosting the flourishing modern industry in Wuhan. Meanwhile, he initiated education reform, opened dozens of modern educational organizations successively, such as Lianghu (Hunan and Hubei) Academy of Classical Learning, Civil General Institute, Military General Institute, Foreign Languages Institute and Lianghu (Hunan and Hubei) General Normal School, and selected a great many students for study overseas, which well promoted the development of China's modern education. Furthermore, he trained a modern military and organized a modern army including a zhen and a xie (both zhen and xie are military units in the Qing dynasty) in Hubei. All of these laid a solid foundation for the modernization of Wuhan.

Originally known as the Hubei Arsenal, the Hanyang Arsenal was founded in 1891 by Qing official Zhang Zhidong, who diverted funds from the Nanyang Fleet in Guangdong to build the arsenal. It cost about 250,000 pounds sterling and was built in 4 years. On 23 April 1894, construction was completed and the arsenal, occupying some 40 acres (160,000 m^{2}), could start production of small-calibre cannons. It built magazine-fed rifles, Gruson quick fire guns, and cartridges.

=== Wuchang Uprising ===
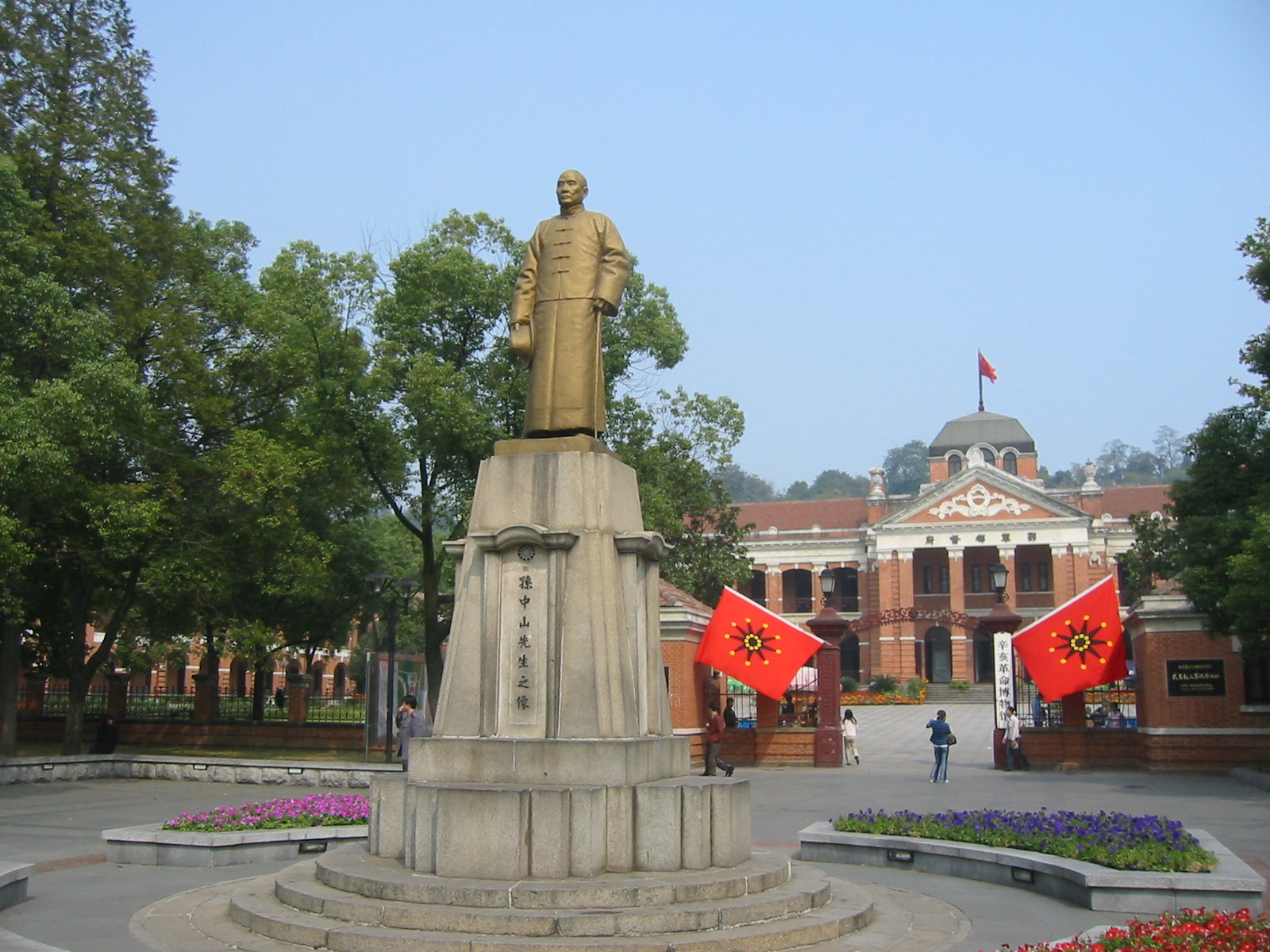
Wuchang Uprising Memorial, the original site of revolutionary government in 1911

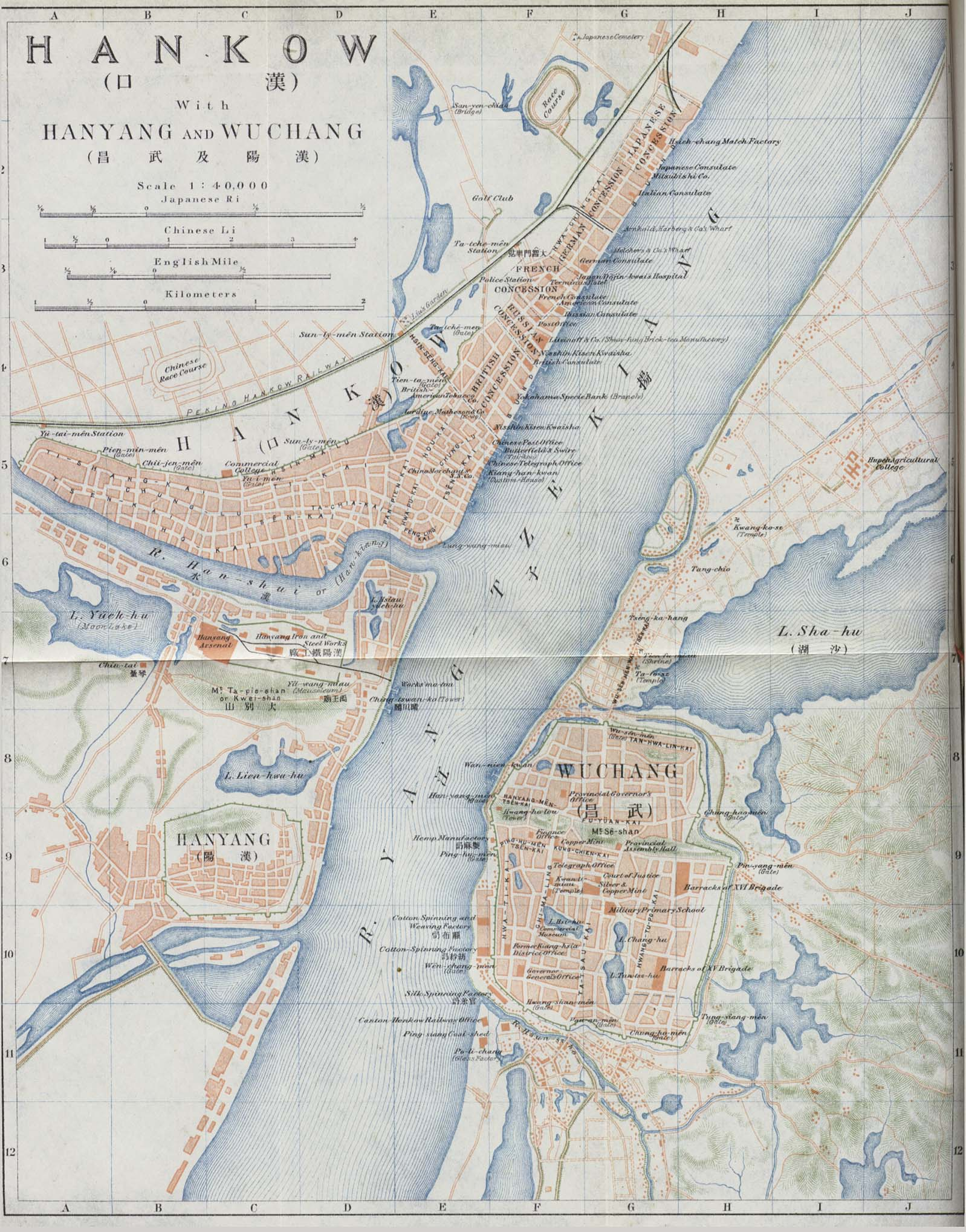
Present-day Wuhan area in 1915

On October 10, 1911, Sun Yat-sen's followers launched the Wuchang Uprising, which led to the collapse of the Qing dynasty, as well as the establishment of the Republic of China. Wuhan was the capital of a leftist Kuomintang government led by Wang Jingwei, in opposition to Chiang Kai-shek and the nationalist government during the 1920s.

The Wuchang Uprising of October 1911, which overthrew the Qing dynasty, originated in Wuhan. Before the uprising, anti-Qing secret societies were active in Wuhan. In September 1911, the outbreak of the protests in Sichuan forced the Qing authorities to send part of the New Army garrisoned in Wuhan to suppress the rebellion. On September 14 the Literary Society (文學社) and the Progressive Association (共進會), two local revolutionary organizations in Hubei, set up joint headquarters in Wuchang and planned for an uprising. On the morning of October 9, a bomb at the office of the political arrangement exploded prematurely and alerted local authorities. The proclamation for the uprising, beadroll and the revolutionaries’ official seal fell into the hands of Rui Cheng, the governor-general of Hunan and Hubei, who demolished the uprising headquarters the same day and set out to arrest the revolutionaries listed in the beadroll. This forced the revolutionaries to launch the uprising earlier than planned.

On the night of October 10, the revolutionaries fired shots to signal the uprising at the engineering barracks of Hubei New Army. They then led the New Army of all barracks to join the revolution. Under the guidance of Wu Zhaolin, Cai Jimin and others, this revolutionary army seized the official residence of the governor and government offices. Rui Cheng fled in panic into the Chu-Yu Ship. Zhang Biao, the commander of Qing army, also fled the city. On the morning of the 11th, the revolutionary army took the whole city of Wuchang, but leaders such as Jiang Yiwu and Sun Wu disappeared. Thus the leaderless revolutionary army recommended Li Yuanhong, the assistant governor of Qing army, as the commander-in-chief. Li founded the Hubei Military Government, proclaimed the abolition of the Qing rule in Hubei, the founding of the Republic of China and published an open telegram calling for other provinces to join the revolution. In the next two months, fourteen other provinces would declare their independence from the Qing government.

As the revolution spread to other parts of the country, the Qing government concentrated loyalist military forces to suppress the uprising in Wuhan. From October 17 to December 1, the revolutionary army and local volunteers defended the city in the Battle of Yangxia against better armed and more numerous Qing forces commanded by Yuan Shikai. Huang Xing (黃興) would arrive in Wuhan in early November to take command of the revolutionary army. After fierce fighting and heavy casualties, Qing forces seized Hankou and Hanyang. But Yuan agreed to halt the advance on Wuchang and participated in peace talks, which would eventually lead to the return of Sun Yat-sen from exile, founding of the Republic of China on January 1, 1912, the abdication of the Last Emperor on February 12, and the formation of a united provisional government in the spring of 1912. Through the Wuchang Uprising, Wuhan is known as the birthplace of the Xinhai Revolution, named after the Xinhai year on the Chinese calendar. The city has several museums and memorials to the revolution and the thousands of martyrs who died defending the revolution.

== Republic of China ==
=== Missionaries ===
Reverend (later Bishop) Edward Galvin led the first band of the Missionary Society of St. Columban to open their mission in the Hanyang District. Galvin was named Apostolic Prefect of the Apostolic Prefecture of Hanyang by the Holy See in 1923 and later made the Apostolic Vicar of the promoted Apostolic Vicariate of Hanyang in 1927, with Galvin being consecrated as its titular bishop (it became a diocese under him in 1946, suffragan of the Roman Catholic Archdiocese of Hankou).

=== National government moves its capital to Wuhan ===
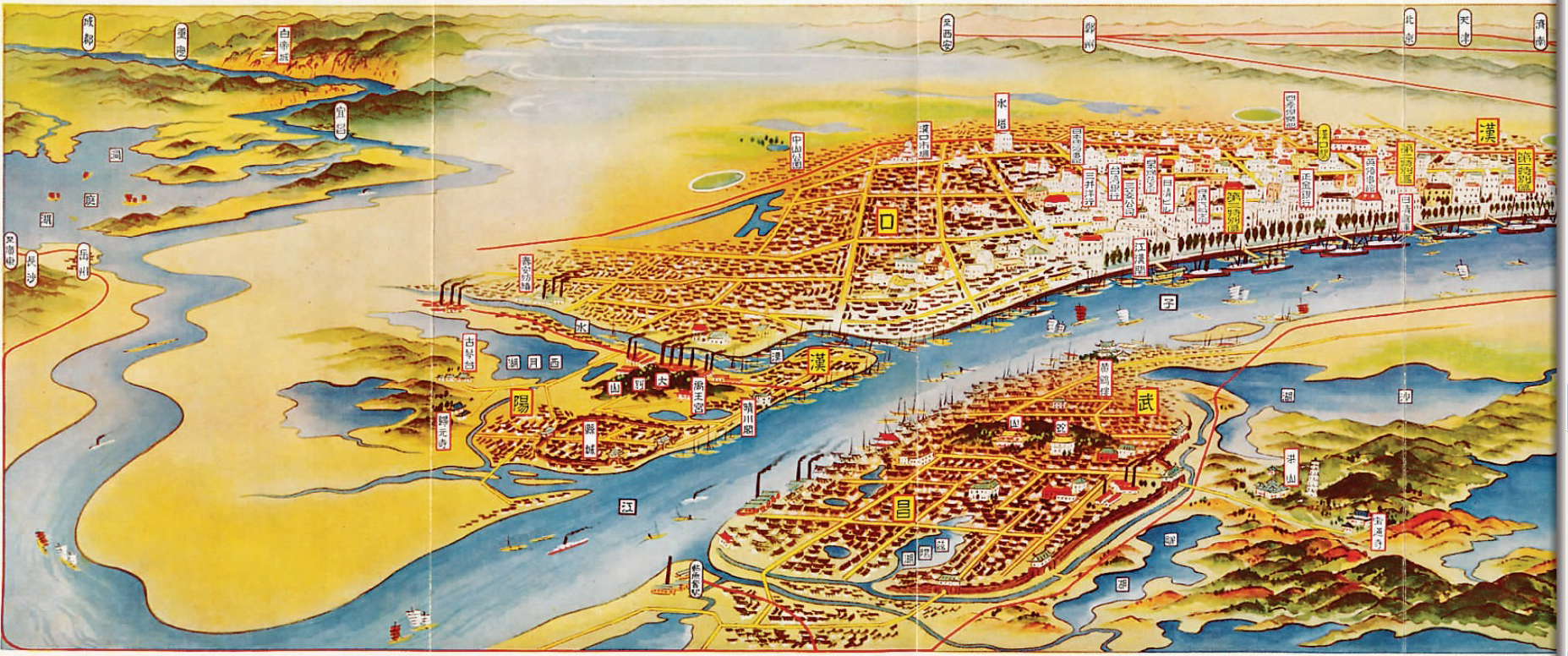
A map of Wuhan painted by Japanese in 1930, with Hankou being the most prosperous sector

Li Zongren's first victories as a Nationalist general were in Hunan, where he defeated rival warlord Wu Peifu in two successive battles and captured the provincial capital, Wuhan, in 1926. With the northern extension of the Northern Expedition, the center of the Great Revolution shifted from the Pearl River basin to the Yangtze River basin. On November 26, the KMT Central Political Committee decided to move the capital from Guangzhou to Wuhan. In middle December, most of the KMT central executive commissioners and national government commissioners arrived in Wuhan, set up the temporary joint conference of central executive commissioners and National Government commissioners, performed the top functions of central party headquarters and National Government, declared they would work in Wuhan on January 1, 1927, and decided to combine the towns of Wuchang, Hankou, and Hanyang into Wuhan City, called "Capital District". The national government was in the Nanyang Building in Hankou, while the central party headquarters and other organizations chose their locations in Hankou or Wuchang. In March 1927, Mao Zedong appeared at the Third Plenum of the KMT Central Executive Committee in Wuhan, which sought to strip General Chiang of his power by appointing Wang Jingwei leader. The first phase of the Northern Expedition was interrupted by the political split in the Kuomintang following the formation of the Nanjing faction in April 1927 against the existing faction in Wuhan. Members of the Chinese Communist Party, who had survived the April 12 massacre, met at Wuhan and re-elected Chen Duxiu (Ch'en Tu-hsiu) as the Party's Secretary General. The split was partially motivated by the purge of the Communists within the party, which marked the end of the First United Front, and Chiang Kai-shek briefly stepped down as the commander of the National Revolutionary Army.

In June 1927, Stalin sent a telegram to the Communists in Wuhan, calling for mobilisation of an army of workers and peasants. This alarmed Wang Jingwei, who decided to break with the Communists and come to terms with Chiang Kai-shek. The Wuhan coup was a political shift made on July 15, 1927, by Wang Jingwei towards Chiang Kai-shek, and his Shanghai-based rival in the Kuomintang (KMT). Borodin returned to the Soviet Union by train in July 1927, accompanied by Sun Yat-sen's widow Soong Ching-ling. "The revolution extends to the Yangzi River," Borodin told a reporter as they began their journey, and "if a diver were sent down to the bottom of this yellow stream he would rise again with an armful of shattered hopes." On July 27, 1927, Soviet emissary Mikhail Borodin and 30 people left Wuhan in five cars and five trucks to return to the USSR in a two-month overland trip, after General Feng Yuxiang was bribed to guarantee him safe passage—twelve days after Chinese Communists were expelled. Borodin had had a bounty of US$29,000 for his capture, and had hidden in the home of Nationalist official and future Chinese Premier T. V. Soong. Borodin finally returned to Moscow on October 6.

The Wuhan Nationalist Government was established in Wuhan on February 21, 1927, and ended by August 19, 1927.

=== Flooding in the 1930s ===
In the 1931 China floods, the high-water mark was reached on 19 August at Hankou, with the water level exceeding 16 m (53 ft) above normal. Comparatively, this is an average of 1.7 m (5.6 ft) above the Shanghai Bund. In 1936, when natural disaster struck Central China with widespread flooding affecting Hebei, Hunan, Jiangxi, Wuhan and Chongqing caused by the Yangtze and Huai Rivers bursting their banks, Ong Seok Kim, as Chairman of the Sitiawan Fundraising and Disaster Relief Committee, raised money and materials in support of the victims.

=== Battle of Wuhan ===
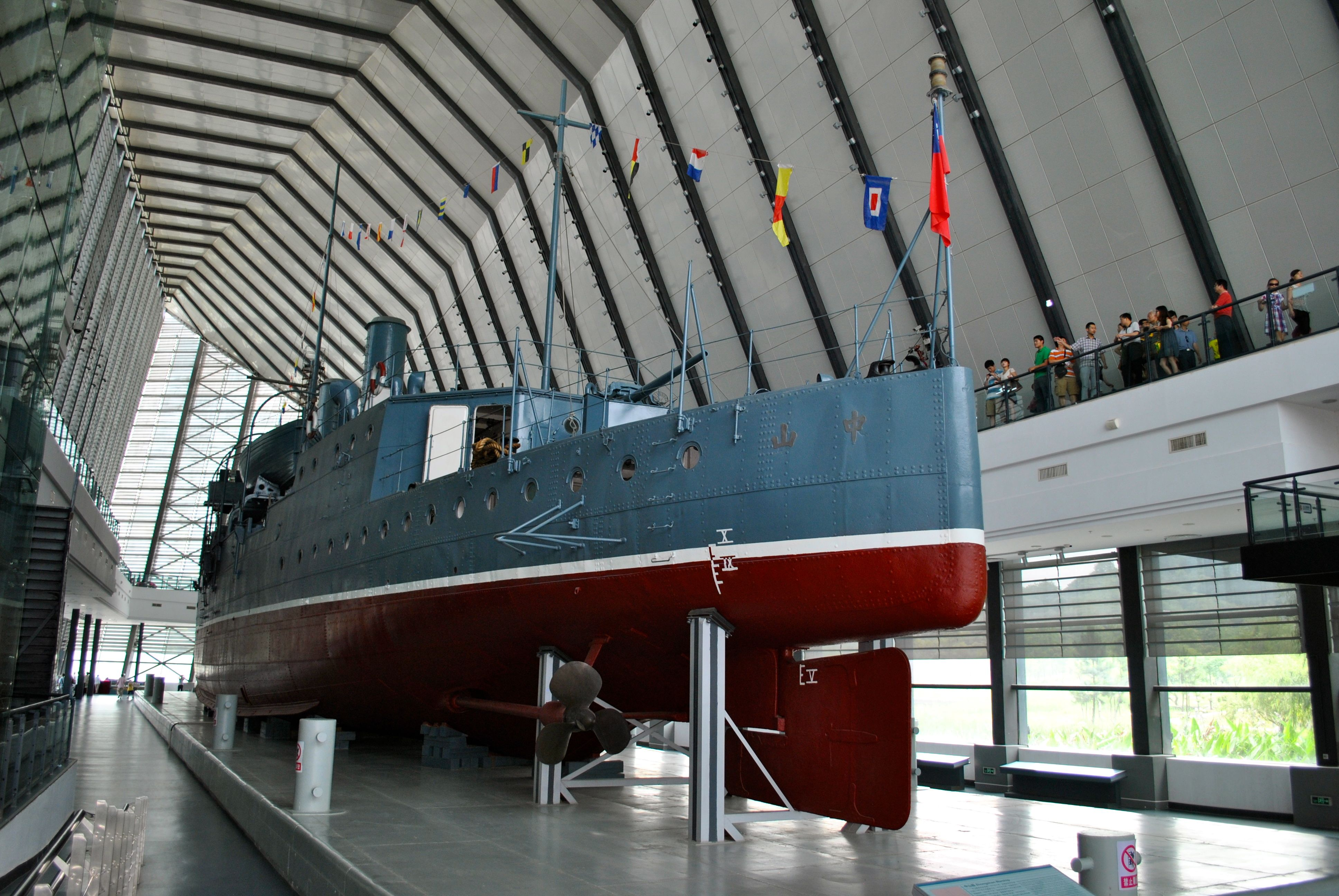
The gunboat Zhongshan

During the Second Sino-Japanese War and following the fall of Nanking in December 1937, Wuhan had become the provisional capital of China's Kuomintang government, and became another focal point of pitched air battles beginning in early 1938 between modern monoplane bomber and fighter aircraft of the Imperial Japanese forces and the Chinese Air Force, which included support from the Soviet Volunteer Group in both planes and personnel, as U.S. support in war materials waned. As the battle raged on through 1938, Wuhan and the surrounding region had become the site of the Battle of Wuhan. After being taken by the Japanese in late 1938, Wuhan became a major Japanese logistics center for operations in southern China.

In early October 1938, Japanese troops moved east and north in the outskirts of Wuhan. As a result, numerous companies and enterprises and large numbers of people had to withdraw from Wuhan to the west of Hubei and Sichuan. The KMT navy undertook the responsibility of defending the Yangtze River on patrol and covering the withdrawal. On October 24, while overseeing the waters of the Yangtze River near the town of Jinkou (Jiangxia District in Wuhan) in Wuchang, the KMT gunboat Zhongshan came up against six Japanese aircraft. Though two were eventually shot down, the Zhongshan sank with 25 casualties. Raised from the bottom of the Yangtze River in 1997, and restored at a local shipyard, the Zhongshan has been moved to a purpose-built museum in Wuhan's suburban Jiangxia District, which opened on September 26, 2011.

=== Bombing of Wuhan ===
As a key center on the Yangtze, Wuhan was an important base for Japanese operations in China and the Chinese leadership in Chongqing, namely Chiang Kai-shek, Chen Cheng and He Yingqin, approved the tactic of strategic firebombing of Japanese occupied city of Wuhan. In December 1944, the city was largely destroyed by U.S. firebombing raids conducted by the Fourteenth Air Force. On 18 December 1944, Wuhan was bombed by 77 American bombers that set off a firestorm that destroyed much of the city. For the next three days, Wuhan was bombed by the Americans, destroying all of the docks and warehouses of Wuhan, as well as Japanese air bases in the city. The air raids killed thousands of Chinese civilians which American bombers did not know. "According to casualty statistics compiled by Hankou city in 1946, more than 20,000 were killed or injured in the December bombings of 1944."

=== Chinese Civil War ===
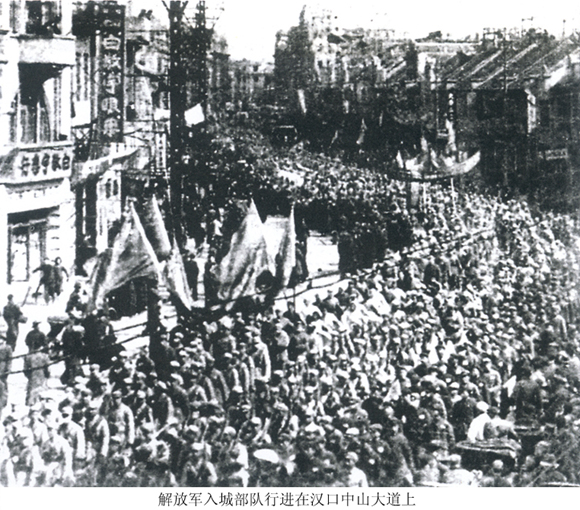
People's Liberation Army troops at Zhongshan Avenue, Hankou on May 16, 1949

People's Liberation Army troops entered Wuhan on May 16, 1949.

== People's Republic of China ==
=== 1954 Yangtze River floods ===
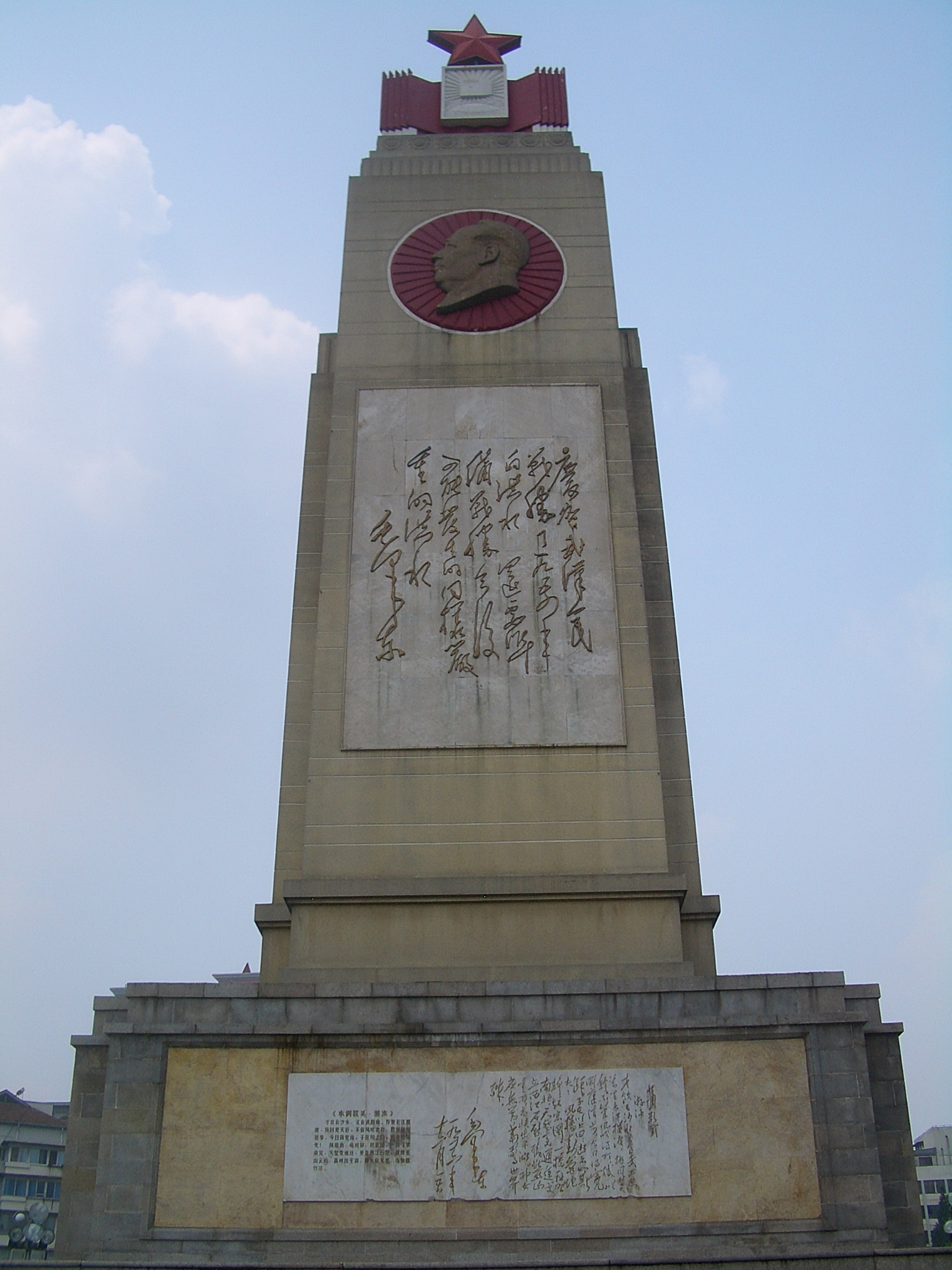
In his poem "Swimming" (1956), engraved on the 1954 Flood Memorial in Wuhan, Mao Zedong envisions "walls of stone" to be erected upstream.

The Changjiang Water Resources Commission was re-established in February 1950 with its headquarters seated in Wuhan.

From June to September 1954, the Yangtze River Floods were a series of catastrophic floodings that occurred mostly in Hubei Province. Due to unusually high volume of precipitation as well as an extraordinarily long rainy season in the middle stretch of the Yangtze River late in the spring of 1954, the river started to rise above its usual level in around late June. Despite efforts to open three important flood gates to alleviate the rising water by diverting it, the flood level continued to rise until it hit the historic high of 44.67 m in Jingzhou, Hubei and 29.73 m in Wuhan. The number of dead from this flood was estimated at 33,000, including those who died of plague in the aftermath of the disaster.

In 1969, a large stone monument was erected in the riverside park in Hankou honoring the heroic deeds in fighting the 1954 Yangtze River floods.

=== Completion of the First Yangtze River Bridge ===
Before construction of the Wuhan Yangtze River Bridge, Hunslet Engine Company built two extra heavy 0-8-0 locomotives for loading the train ferries for crossing the Yangtze River in Wuhan.

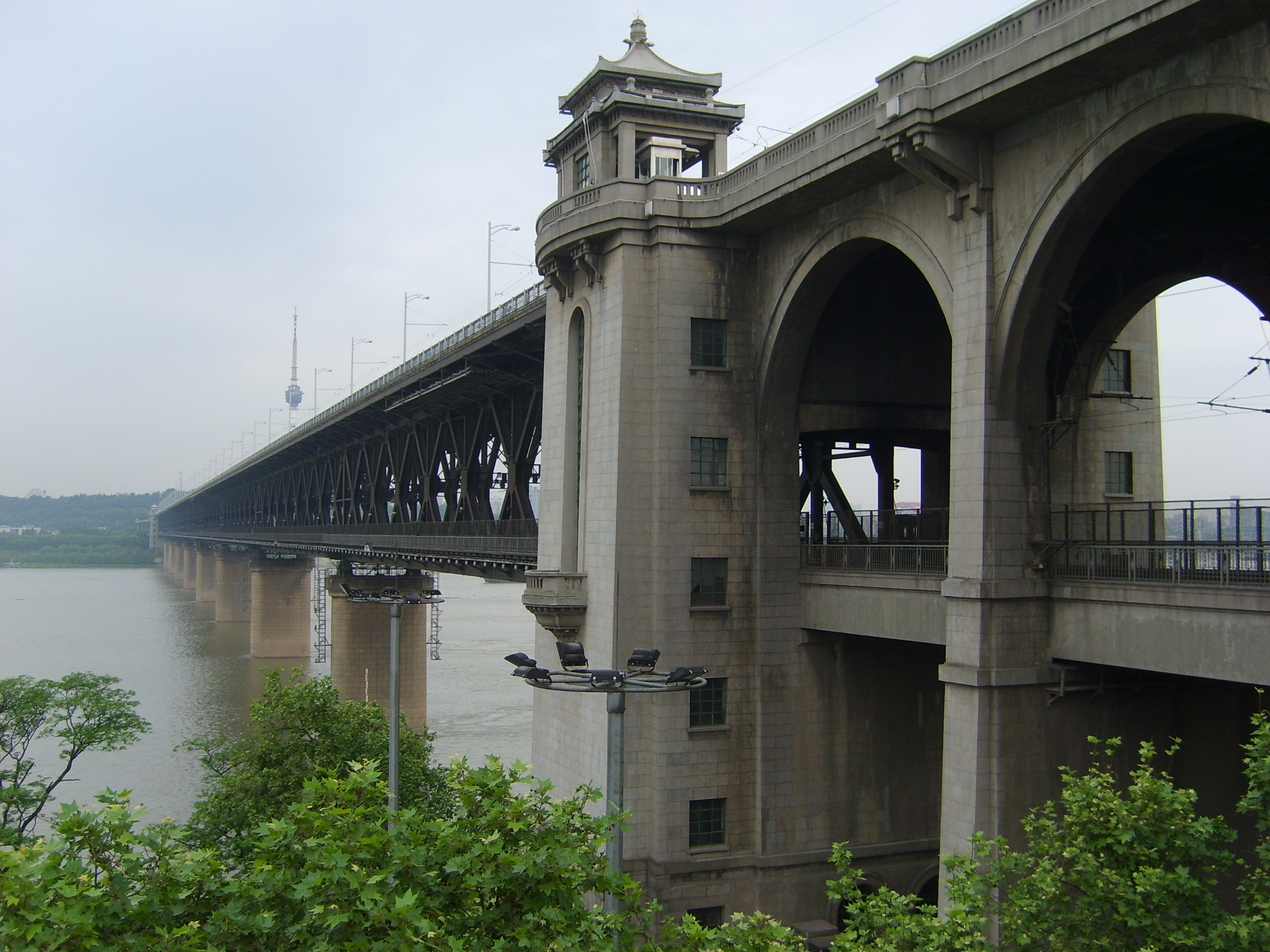
The First Yangtze River Bridge

The project of building the Wuhan Yangtze River Bridge, also known as the First Yangtze River Bridge, was regarded as one of the key projects during the first five-year plan. The Engineering Bureau of the First Yangtze River Bridge, set up by the Ministry of Railway in April 1953, was responsible for the design and construction of the bridge. The document "Resolutions on Building the First Yangtze River Bridge" was passed in the 203rd conference of State Council on January 15, 1954. The technical conference on the routes of the bridge, held in Hankou on January 15, 1955, determined that the route from Tortoise Hill to Snake Hill was the best choice.

On October 25, 1955, construction began on the bridge proper. The same day in 1957, the whole project was completed and an opening-to-traffic ceremony was held on October 15. The bridge is 1,670 m (5,479.00 ft) long, of which the upper level is a highway with a width of 22.5 m (73.82 ft) and the lower level is a double-line railway with a width of 18 m (59.06 ft). The bridge proper is 1,156 m (3,792.65 ft) long with two pairs of eight piers and nine arches with a space of 128 m (419.95 ft) between each arch. The First Yangtze River Bridge united the Beijing–Hankou Railway with the Guangdong–Hankou Railway into the Beijing–Guangzhou Railway, making Wuhan a thoroughfare to nine provinces in name and in fact.

=== Beidaihe Conference ===
After Chengdu Conference, Mao went to Chongqing and Wuhan in April to inspect the countryside and factories. In Wuhan, he called all the leaders of provinces and municipalities who had not attended Chengdu Conference to report their work. Tian Jiaying, the secretary of Mao, said that Wuhan Conference was a supplement to Chengdu Conference.

=== Wuhan Incident ===
In July 1967, civil strife struck the city in the Wuhan Incident ("July 20th Incident"), an armed conflict between two hostile groups who were fighting for control over the city at the height of the Cultural Revolution.

=== Crash of Wuhan Airlines Flight 343 ===
On June 22, 2000, a Wuhan Airlines flight from Enshi to Wuhan was forced to circle for 30 minutes due to thunderstorms. The aircraft eventually crashed on the banks of Han River in Hanyang District, all on-board perished (there were varying accounts of number of crews and passengers). In addition, the crash also killed 7 people on the ground.

=== 2008 Summer Olympics Boycotts ===
Chinese protesters organized boycotts of the French-owned retail chain Carrefour in major Chinese cities including Kunming, Hefei and Wuhan, accusing the French nation of pro-secessionist conspiracy and anti-Chinese racism. The BBC reported that hundreds of people demonstrated in Beijing, Wuhan, Hefei, Kunming and Qingdao.

=== Internet Firewall ===
On May 19, 2011, Fang Binxing, the Principal of Beijing University of Posts and Telecommunications (also known as "Father of China's Great Fire Wall") was hit on the chest by a shoe thrown at him by a Huazhong University of Science and Technology student who calls herself "hanunyi" (Chinese:寒君依, or 小湖北) while Fang was giving a lecture at Wuhan University. According to RFI, the student discussed the planned shoe attack on Twitter and, with the help of other bloggers, was able to locate the exact whereabouts and the time of Fang's lecture. After the shoeing, "Hanunyi" walked out while other students tried to obstruct school teachers who were going to detain her. "Hanunyi" became an instant internet hero of the Chinese blogosphere. During an interview with CNN, "Hanunyi" said, "I'm not happy about what (Fang) does. His work made me spend unnecessary money to get access to the website that is supposed to be free... He makes my online surfing very inconvenient."

=== Flooding in the 2010s ===
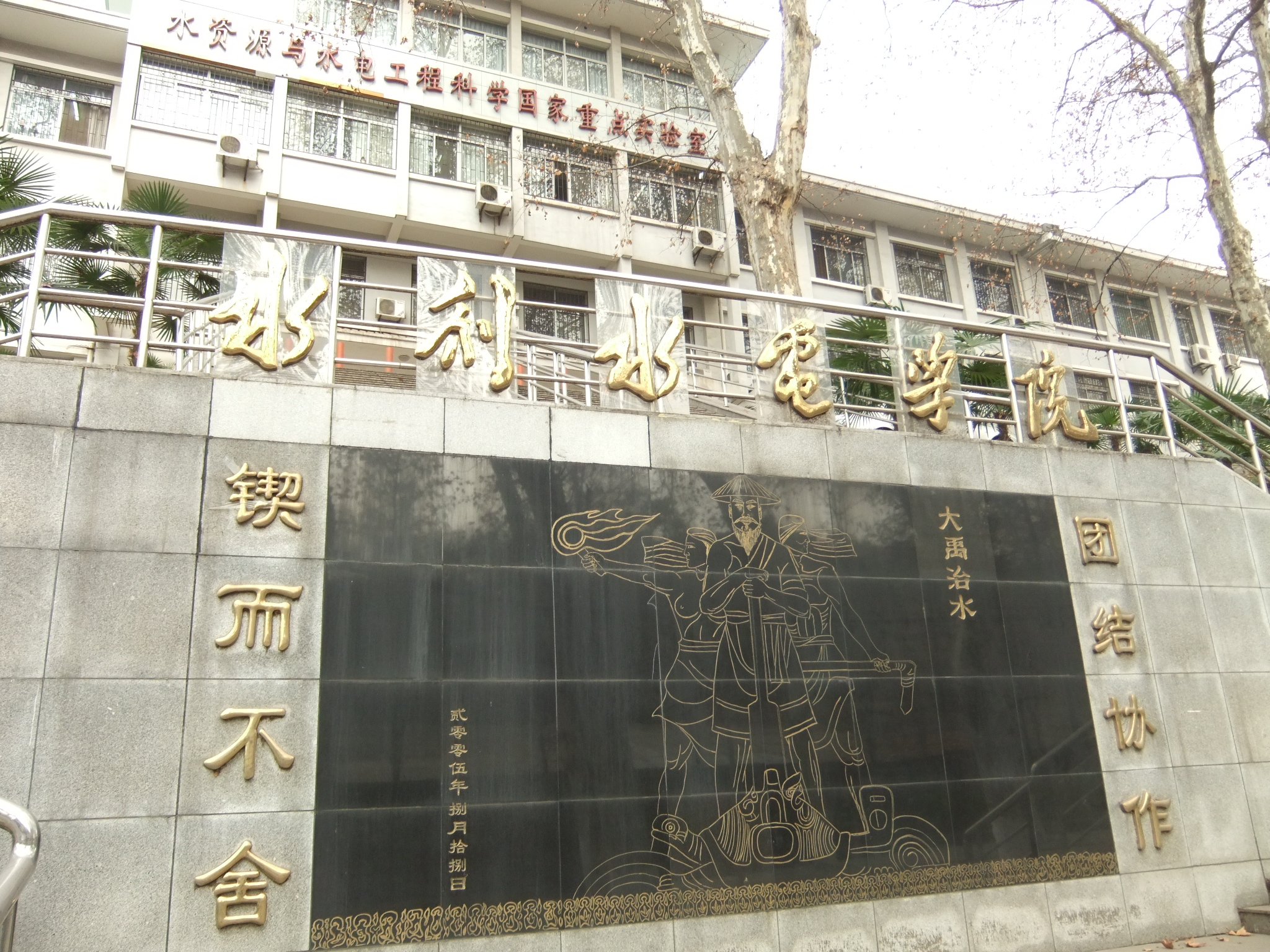
The Water Resources and Hydro Power Lab, Wuhan University (2005)

The city has been subject to devastating floods, which are now supposed to be controlled by the ambitious Three Gorges Dam, a project which was completed in 2008. The 2008 Chinese winter storms damaged water supply equipment in Wuhan: up to 100,000 people were out of running water when several water pipes burst, cutting the supply to local households. The 2010 Northern Hemisphere summer heat wave hit Wuhan on July 3. In the 2010 China floods, the Han River at Wuhan experienced its worst flooding in twenty years, as officials continued sandbagging efforts along the Han and Yangtze Rivers in the city and checked reservoirs. In the 2011 China floods, Wuhan was flooded, with parts of the city losing power.

In the 2016 China floods, Wuhan saw 570 mm (22 in) of rainfall during the first week of July, surpassing the record that fell on the city in 1991. A red alert for heavy rainfall was issued on 2 July, the same day that eight people died after a 15-metre (49 ft) section of a 2 m (6.6 ft) tall wall collapsed on top of them. The city's subway system, the Wuhan Metro was partially submerged as was the main railway station. At least 14 city residents were killed, one was missing, and more than 80,000 were relocated.

On January 31, 2018, Theresa May, Prime Minister of the United Kingdom, visited Wuhan, spoke at Wuhan University and visited the Yellow Crane Tower and the First Yangtze River Bridge. She took pictures at the Yellow Crane Tower and on the Wuchang District side of the Yangtze River at the First Yangtze River Bridge.

=== COVID-19 ===
The COVID-19 pandemic had its first major outbreak in Wuhan in November or December 2019. The city was placed under lockdown on 23 January 2020 to control the spread of the disease.
