= Patrick Cleary =

Irish priest and missionary (1886–1970)

Patrick Cleary S.S.C.M.E.
- Bishop of Nancheng
- Church: Catholic Church
- Diocese: Diocese of Nancheng
- In office: 21 July 1933 – 23 October 1970
- Predecessor: Prefecture established
- Previous post: Titular Bishop of Amathus in Cypro (1938-1946)

Orders
- Ordination: 18 June 1911
- Consecration: 16 April 1939 by John A. O'Shea

Personal details
- Born: 3 March 1886 Kildysart, County Clare, United Kingdom of Great Britain and Ireland
- Died: 23 October 1970 (aged 84) Dalgan Park (southeast of Navan), County Meath, Republic of Ireland

Patrick Cleary (3 March 1886 – 23 October 1970) was an Irish missionary priest who served as Bishop of the Roman Catholic Diocese of Nancheng, China. An educator, he established a seminary in Nancheng. In 1949, the People's Republic of China was established, which was resistant to foreigners and western religion. He continued to run the mission until 1952, when he was imprisoned and then expelled from China. He returned to Ireland where he returned to teaching at St Columban's College seminary.

== Early life and education ==
Patrick Cleary was born on 3 March 1886 in Kildysart, County Clare. He had two sisters, who became Nazareth nuns, Sister Margaret and Sister Hildegard, and a brother John. Educated locally and at St. Flannan's College, Ennis, Cleary studied for the priesthood at St Patrick's College, Maynooth. Ordained in 18 July 1911 for the Diocese of Killaloe, Dr. Cleary received a Doctorate of Divinity in 1914. His dissertation was The Church and Usury. An Essay on Some Historical and Theological Aspects of Money-Lending (1914).

== Career ==
=== Ireland ===
For four years, until 1918, he was a professor and the chair of moral theology in Maynooth. He then taught at the St Columban's College seminary in Dalgan in County Galway of the Maynooth Mission to China, later known as the Missionary Society of Saint Columban. In 1918, the Columban Fathers was formed and he was among the first group of men to join. For eleven years, beginning in 1919, he was the rector.

=== China ===
He served the Society in Nancheng, China beginning in 1931, replacing the martyred Columban priest Cornelius Tierney who had been kidnapped by communist guerrillas and subsequently died. After arriving in Nancheng, he wrote to a friend that "It is simply delightful, with a charming church, a compound full of buildings that would house an army." While in China, his primary activity was teaching students at his seminary. The courses that he covered were theology, scripture, canon law, philosophy, and the English language.

On 21 July 1933, he was appointed Prefect Apostolic. He became Vicar Apostolic in December 1938 and the following April he was ordained a bishop. At times he was at odds with the "Roman" model or approach for operating the church. For instance, while a bishop, he did not adopt the approach to build congregants by taking in and baptising abandoned children.

During World War II (1939–1945), according to an obituary, he aided people that needed assistance, including Doolittle's Raiders, who had crashed near the city in 1942 after bombing Tokyo. One month after the rescue, the city was attacked and Cleary nearly died several times. The entire city was burned in retaliation for having aided Doolittle's men. He aided anyone that needed help, including Chinese and Japanese people. In 1942, Cleary established the Nancheng Relief Committee. In Nancheng, he became the first bishop of the Diocese of Nancheng in 1947 on the feast day of the Most Holy Rosary. He became the Most Reverend Patrick Cleary.

On 1 October 1949, the People's Republic of China was established. In a drive against foreigners, his and other religious figures began to lose their personal freedom in December 1950. Rural churches began to be repurposed to granaries or meeting places for the communists. He stayed in China until 15 December 1952, when he was expelled held under house arrest for one year, imprisoned, and taken to court on "trumped up charges" of being an imperialist and oppressor after he refused to join a communist-sponsored church. After being found guilty by the court, he was taken to Hong Kong and then returned to Ireland after stopping at Tokyo in 1953. Two of the Chinese priests that served with him were still in prison when he left. Cleary was left frail and unsteady after the ordeal.

During his time in China, he never took a vacation or left the country.

== Personal and later life ==
According to Brendan O Cathoir of the Irish Times, Cleary defended Terence MacSwiney following his fatal hunger strike. MacSwiney had been elected Lord Mayor of Cork as an Irish republican in 1920; due to his political ties, MacSwiney was interned following the election and soon after sentenced to two years in prison for “seditious activity.” In protest, MacSwiney went on a hunger strike hoping to draw attention to British policy in Ireland. MacSwiney would die while still in custody after lasting 74 days on hunger strike. Cleary made clear that though he did not support hunger strike as means to suicide (long considered a mortal sin by the Catholic Church), he considered it to be “theologically justifiable,” if used to draw attention to the policies of the British government towards Ireland at the time.

After 1952, he returned from China to teaching at St Columban's. In June 1957, after returning from China, he ordained William Patrick Kinane in Thurles, Ireland at the Cathedral of the Assumption. He attended the Second Vatican Council (1962–1965). Cleary died on 23 October 1970 at St Columban's in Dalgan and was buried in the Missionary Society of Saint Columban Cemetery, in Navan.

== See also ==
- Catholic Church in China
