= Newcestown =

Village in County Cork, Ireland

Newcestown Baile Níos
- Village
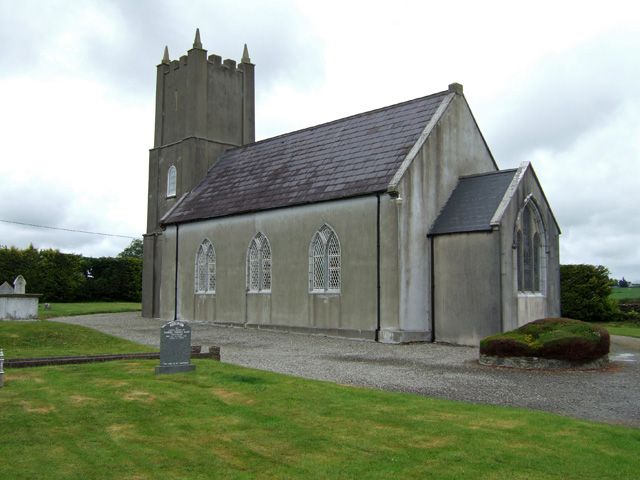
- St Patrick's (Church of Ireland) Church lies just south of Newcestown village

- Location in Ireland
- Coordinates: 51°46′51.49″N 08°52′02.21″W
- Country: Ireland
- Province: Munster
- County: County Cork
- Time zone: UTC+0 (WET)
  - Summer (DST): UTC-1 (IST (WEST))

Newcestown (Irish: Baile Níos) is a small village located 35 km from the city of Cork in the western part of County Cork, Ireland. It is a village with a church, a school, a pub and GAA club. Newcestown is part of the Dáil constituency of Cork North-West.

== Amenities ==
The local Roman Catholic church is the Church of St. John the Baptist. It was built in 1872 in a Gothic Revival style. The nearby Church of Ireland church is dedicated to St. Patrick and was built c. 1810.

The local national (primary) school is Bishop Galvin Central School, which is named for Bishop Edward J. Galvin, the first Roman Catholic Bishop of Hanyang in China.

== Sport ==
Newcestown GAA is the local Gaelic Athletic Association club. It was founded in 1959 and competes in both Senior hurling and Senior Gaelic football competitions in Cork. The club won the Cork Premier Intermediate Football Championship in 1971, 2001 and 2010. In hurling, Newcestown were promoted to the senior grade in 2015, after winning the 2015 Cork Premier Intermediate Hurling Championship final. In 2023, the club won the senior A championship in both hurling and football.

Soccer is another sport associated with the village. A local team, Spartak Mossgrove, was founded in 2015 and have been competing in the West Cork Soccer League since their foundation. The name of the team (as well as being a play on Spartak Moscow) derives from the local townland 'Mossgrove' just outside the village. Their home colours are blue and white.

Just outside the main village is an 18 hole pitch and putt course.

== People ==
Edward Galvin was born in Newcestown on 23 November 1882. He was ordained as a priest in St Patrick's College, Maynooth, County Kildare, in 1909. Later becoming a bishop, Galvin is credited with being the founder of the Missionary Society of St. Columban and first Bishop of Hanyang in China. He was expelled from China in 1951, and he returned home in 1953 where he retired to Dalgan Park, Navan, County Meath. He died at St. Columbans College, Dalgan Park, on 23 February 1956 and is buried there.

== See also ==
- List of towns and villages in Ireland
