= Diocese of Nancheng =

Roman Catholic diocese in China

Diocese of Nancheng Dioecesis Nancemensis 天主教南城教区

Location
- Country: China
- Ecclesiastical province: Nanchang
- Metropolitan: Nanchang

Statistics
- Population: Total; Catholics: (as of 1950); 4,872,691; 25,996 (0.5%)

Information
- Rite: Latin Rite

Current leadership
- Pope: Leo XIV
- Bishop: Sede Vacante

The Roman Catholic Diocese of Nancheng (Latin: Nancemen(sis), Chinese: 南城) is a diocese located in Nancheng (Jiangxi) in the ecclesiastical province of Nanchang in China.

== History ==
- November 29, 1932: Established as Apostolic Prefecture of Jianchangfu 建昌府 from the Apostolic Vicariate of Yujiang 餘江
- December 13, 1938: Promoted as Apostolic Vicariate of Nancheng 南城
- April 11, 1946: Promoted as Diocese of Nancheng 南城

== Leadership ==
- Bishops of Nancheng 南城 (Roman rite)
  - Bishop Patrick Cleary, S.S.C.M.E. (April 11, 1946 – October 23, 1970)
- Vicars Apostolic of Nancheng 南城 (Roman Rite)
  - Bishop Patrick Cleary, S.S.C.M.E. (December 13, 1938 – April 11, 1946)
- Prefects Apostolic of Jianchangfu 建昌府 (Roman Rite)
  - Fr. Patrick Cleary, S.S.C.M.E. (later Bishop) (July 21, 1933 – December 13, 1938)
