= Rufus Halley =

Murdered Roman Catholic missionary

Rufus Halley (1944 - 28 August 2001) was a Roman Catholic priest of the Missionary Society of St. Columban who spent more than 20 years promoting ecumenical dialogue between Christians and Muslims in Asia. A native of Killoteran, County Waterford, Ireland, he was appointed to the Philippines shortly after his ordination to the priesthood in 1969, living with and ministering to the rural poor.

In 1980, he moved to Mindanao in the south of the Philippines and volunteered to engage in dialogue with local Muslims. In a bid to break down the mutual distrust and mistrust, Halley integrated with both Christian and Muslim communities by learning two local languages (one of which being Maranao) and worked for many years in a store owned by a Muslim selling rice and corn. Halley fought for the rights of oppressed Muslims, who were being targeted by the Philippine Army.

== Death ==
On 28 August 2001, Halley was travelling by motorcycle to attend the wedding of a poor local couple when he was ambushed by a band of men. According to witness accounts, Halley tried to escape and was shot at point-blank range. It is not known why Halley was targeted.

Halley was mourned by both Christians and Muslims following his death. An estimated 2000 people attended his funeral in Mindanao.

== Posthumous ==
The Auroro Aragon-Quezon Foundation in Manila made a posthumous award to Halley for his contributions in Lanao del Sur, Philippines. According to the citation, Halley "went beyond the ordinary call of a missionary as he exhibited unfailingly the zeal of senseless armed conflict".

The Archbishop of Davau Fernando Capalla described Halley as "a tireless and compassionate peacemaker and shepherd of the flock". Pope John Paul II issued a statement from the Vatican following Halley's death, which highlighted the sacrifice which Halley made for his faith.

A book about Halley's life, and that of fellow missionary Des Hartford (who was kidnapped in the Philippines several years earlier), was published in 2019 by Mercier Press.
