= John Blowick =

Irish priest (1888–1972)

Rev John Blowick
- Born: 26 October 1888; Belcarra, County Mayo, Ireland
- Died: 19 June 1972 (aged 83); Dalgan Park, Navan, Ireland
- Burial place: Missionary Society of Saint Columban Cemetery, Navan
- Education: St. Jarlath's College, Tuam; St. Patrick's College, Maynooth
- Occupations: Missionary priest, theologian
- Known for: Co-founder of the Maynooth Mission to China
- Parent(s): John Blowick (father), Honoria Blowick (mother, née Madden)

Rev John Blowick (1888–1972) was an Irish missionary priest and theologian. He was one of the founders of the Maynooth Mission to China which was later known as the Missionary Society of St. Columban.

== Life ==
John Blowick was born 26 October 1888 in Belcarra, County Mayo, to John Blowick a farmer, and Honoria Blowick (née Madden). He was educated at Westport CBS, and St. Jarlath's College in Tuam, County Galway. He trained as a priest in St Patrick's College, Maynooth gaining a first in his BA degree, following postgraduate studies he was appointed a professor of theology at Maynooth in June 1914 after a competitive concursus (he was the last Maynooth professor selected in that way).

He co-founded the Maynooth Mission to China with Rev Edward Galvin. In 1918 he founded St Columban's College, Dalgan Park, Shrule, County Galway, as the seminary for the Society, which in 1941 moved to Navan, Co. Meath.

Two of Blowick's younger brothers became priests and a third Joseph Blowick entered the politics. Rev Stephen Blowick was Parish priest of Islandeady in Co. Mayo, Rev Peter Blowick served as Rector of St. Columbans College, and Joseph Blowick became TD for Mayo South, was a founder and leader of Clann na Talmhan a small farmers’ party, serving as Minister of Lands in the inter-party governments of 1948-51 and 1954-57.

He died on 19 June 1972 at Dalgan Park, Navan, and was buried at the Missionary Society of Saint Columban Cemetery, in Navan.
