= Thomas Stewart (Catholic bishop) =

Thomas Stewart S.S.C.M.E.
- Bishop of Chunchon
- Church: Catholic Church
- Diocese: Diocese of Chunchon
- In office: 1 February 1966 – 21 May 1994
- Predecessor: Thomas F. Quinlan
- Successor: John Chang Yik

Orders
- Ordination: 21 December 1950 by John Anthony Kyne
- Consecration: 11 May 1966 by Antonio del Giudice

Personal details
- Born: 8 August 1925 Woodford, County Galway, Irish Free State, British Empire
- Died: 30 October 1994 (aged 69) Ireland

Styles of Thomas Stewart
- Reference style: The Most Reverend
- Spoken style: Your Excellency
- Religious style: Bishop

Thomas Stewart (8 August 1925 – 30 October 1994) was an Irish Columban priest, who served as Bishop of Chuncheon in South Korea from 1966 until 1994.

Stewart was born in 1925 in Woodford, County Galway, Ireland. He was ordained a priest in 1950 for the Missionary Society of St. Columban, and went to South Korea in 1954. He served as Vicar General in the Chunchon Diocese before being elevated in 1966 to Bishop.

For health reasons, Stewart retired in May 1994. He died a few months later in Ireland of a heart attack.
