= John Chang Yik =

South Korean Catholic bishop (1933–2020)

- Bishop of Chunchon
- Native name: 장익
- Church: Catholic Church
- Diocese: Diocese of Chunchon
- In office: 11 November 1994 – 28 January 2010
- Predecessor: Thomas Stewart
- Successor: Lucas Kim Un-hoe
- Other post: Apostolic Administrator of Hamhung (2006-2010)

Orders
- Ordination: 30 March 1963
- Consecration: 14 December 1994 by Stephen Kim Sou-hwan

Personal details
- Born: 20 November 1933 Keijō, Keiki Province, Chōsen, Empire of Japan
- Died: 5 August 2020 (aged 86) Chuncheon, Gangwon Province, South Korea

- John Chang Yik
- Hangul: 장익
- Hanja: 張益
- RR: Jang Ik
- MR: Chang Ik

The Right Reverend John Chang Yik (20 November 1933, Seoul – 5 August 2020, Chuncheon) was the Bishop of the Roman Catholic Diocese of Chunchon, South Korea.

The son of Chang Myon, he was born as Chang Yik. On 30 March 1963, aged 29, he was ordained a parish priest. On 11 November 1994, aged 61, he was appointed as Bishop of Chuncheon and ordained a month later. His consecrators were: Stephen Cardinal Kim Sou-hwan, Archbishop Victorinus Youn Kong-hi and Nicolas Cardinal Cheong Jin-suk. He was appointed Apostolic Administrator of Hamhung in North Korea in 2006; he retired from both posts in 2010.
