= Aedan McGrath =

Rev. Aedan McGrath, SSC, born William Aedan McGrath, was an Irish Columban missionary priest in China. McGrath was active with the Legion of Mary and became notable for his work in China as a missionary that eventually led to his imprisonment by the People's Republic of China. After leaving China, McGrath continued his work with the Legion of Mary and with missionary activity in the United Kingdom, the United States, Canada, and the Philippines.

== Early life and priesthood ==
McGrath was born in Drumcondra, Dublin on 22 January 1906, to William a Barrister and Gertrude McGrath, both from County Down. He entered the Missionary Society of St. Columban (Maynooth Mission to China) and was ordained priest in 1929. In 1930, he was sent as a missionary to Tsigngiany in North China, to work on behalf of the Legion of Mary. He was first stationed at a parish in T'sien Kiang, and his work led to the development of six branches of the legion. McGrath was removed by the Japanese during WWII, but in 1947 was commissioned to develop the lay apostolate through the Legion. His work was opposed by the communists who were at that time consolidating political control of the country. Over the following years, McGrath set up branches in Shanghai, Beijing, Tiensin, Canton, Kweiling, and Hongkong. He was working in Chunking when the Communists took control of that city and McGrath was prohibited from further action, although he then returned to Shanghai and continued his mission.

== Imprisonment ==
Following the Communist establishment of the People's Republic of China, in 1949, the Legion of Mary became a proscribed organisation. Its founder, Frank Duff, was declared a "reactionary guardian of the interests of the ruling class." Fr McGrath suffered because of his association and his activities on their behalf. In Shanghai in September 1951, he was imprisoned for two years and eight months by the regime, spending most of that time in solitary confinement and endured torture. Instead of being executed, he was expelled from China in 1954 and returned to Ireland, where he was greeted upon arrival by President Seán T. O'Kelly, Taoiseach Éamon de Valera, John A. Costello amongst others.

== Later life ==
Fr McGrath did not return China after his expulsion for fear of endangering his friends. He worked instead promoting the Legion of Mary in England for ten years, and then worked for 12 years in the US and Canada. In 1979, Fr McGrath was asked by the Columbans and Legion to start a mission based in Manila.

Father Aedan McGrath returned to Ireland in 2000, and he made a TV show which aired in November and attended his last Legion of Mary council meeting in December. He died on Christmas Day 2000, one month short of his 95th birthday, and is buried in the Columban Dalgan Cemetery. In his obituary the Irish Times called him "one of the luminaries of the missionary Columban Fathers."

== Publications ==
- Father W. Aedan McGrath. Theresa Marie Moreau (ed.). Perseverance Through Faith: A Priest's Prison Story.
- Father W. Aedan McGrath, Fr. Eamonn McCarthy and Michael Walsh. From Navan to China: The Story of a "Chinese Irishman".
