= Tony Collier =

Irish Roman Catholic missionary priest (1913–1950)

Fr. Anthony (Tony) Collier, (1913–1950), was an Irish Catholic missionary priest, a member of Missionary Society of St. Columban (the Columban Fathers).

Tony Collier was born on 20 June 1913 in Clogherhead, County Louth, Ireland. He was educated at Christian Brothers in Drogheda (1921–1926) and St. Patrick's College, Armagh (1926–1931). He joined the Columbans in Dalgan Park in 1931 and was ordained there in 1938. Fr. Collier went on mission to Korea in 1939.

Fr Collier was in charge of the second Columban parish in Chunchon, Korea, when he was taken into custody by North Korean soldiers, questioned, and killed on 27 June 1950. Fr. Collier is buried in Gangwon-do, South Korea, along with Irish Bishop Thomas Quinlan and other missionaries.

== Korean War ==
He was killed by North Korean Army on 27 June 1950, the first non-Korean killed during the Korean War.
