= Cornelius Tierney =

Irish missionary priest

Fr. Cornelius Tierney BD (1872–1931) was an Irish missionary priest who joined the Maynooth Mission to China, he died after being kidnapped by Chinese Communist bandits and held in captivity in 1931. Cornelius was born in Clones, County Monaghan, in 1875, he studied at St. Macartan's College, Monaghan, before going to Maynooth College to study for the priesthood. Ordained in Maynooth for the Diocese of Clogher in 1899 taught English and Classics in St. Macartan's, college, and from 1911 he worked as a curate in St. Joseph's, Ballyshannon.

In 1918 he joined the Maynooth Mission to China, which became the St. Columban's Society, he served as bursar spiritual director in Dalgan Park, before going to China in 1920. He worked in Hanyan and then later Kienchang, present day Jianchang in Nancheng county. He was kidnapped in November 1930, by Communist bandits, who demanded a ransom of 10,000 Mexican dollars. British Legation in China tried to negotiate his release but Fr. Tierney died in captivity some three months later in February or March 1931.

The home ground of Aodh Ruadh CLG in Ballyshannon is named Father Tierney Park in his memory.
