= Zhang Bairen =

Peter Zhang Bairen
- Bishop of Hanyang
- Native name: 张伯仁
- Church: Catholic Church
- Diocese: Diocese of Hanyang
- In office: 3 March 1986 – 12 October 2005
- Predecessor: Anthony Tu Shihua

Orders
- Ordination: 19 December 1942
- Consecration: 3 March 1986 by Peter Jin Lugang

Personal details
- Born: 14 February 1914 Mianyang, Hupei, Republic of China
- Died: 12 October 2005 (aged 91)

Peter Zhang Bairen (14 February 1915 – 12 October 2005) was the unofficial Bishop of Hanyang, China.

Chinese authorities did not officially recognize Bishop Peter Zhang; however, he was officially consecrated as a monsignor within the Roman Catholic Church in 1986, by Liu Hede, the unofficial Bishop of Hankou.

Monsignor Zhang spent twenty-four years in prison and labor camps following his continued loyalty to the Pope (1955–1979). In an unusual concession, local authorities permitted Zhang's funeral services to be open to the public.

The funeral took place in October and was attended by both official and unofficial clergy members.
