= Francis Douglas (priest) =

New Zealand Catholic priest (1910–1943)

The Reverend Francis Douglas S.S.C.M.E.
- Church: Catholic Church

Orders
- Ordination: 29 October 1934 by Thomas O'Shea

Personal details
- Born: Francis Vernon Douglas; May 22, 1910 Johnsonville, Wellington, New Zealand
- Died: July 27, 1943 (aged 33) Longos, Kalayaan, Laguna, Philippines
- Occupation: Missionary priest
- Education: Marist Brothers' School (1921–1922); Johnsonville School (1922–1924); Holy Cross College

Sainthood
- Venerated in: Catholic Church

Francis Vernon Douglas (22 May 1910 – c. 27 July 1943) was a New Zealand priest of the Missionary Society of St. Columban who was killed in the Philippines by Japanese soldiers in 1943.

== Biography ==
He was born in Johnsonville, in Wellington, the fifth of eight children (five sons and three daughters) of Kathleen (née Gaffney) and George Charles Douglas, an Australian-born railway worker. His mother was a devout Catholic from County Sligo, Ireland, and his father became a Catholic in 1926.

Douglas trained for the Catholic priesthood at Holy Cross Seminary, Mosgiel. Within a few months of his ordination, at the end of 1934, he applied to join the Missionary Society of St. Columban. He was curate at New Plymouth when he left to join the society at the start of 1937. He was appointed to the Philippines in July 1939. He was posted to Pililla. Five years later during the Japanese occupation he was taken by secret police looking for information on guerrillas active in his area.

Over three days in the Church of Saint James the Apostle in Paete, Laguna, he was beaten and tortured, the presumption being that police were trying to extort information from him about guerrillas whose confessions he may have heard. He remained silent and on 27 July 1943, very weak but still conscious, was put on a truck with a guard of Japanese soldiers. He was never seen again. He is remembered in the name of a boys college in New Plymouth, Francis Douglas Memorial College.

== Beatification ==
In collaboration with the Roman Catholic Archdiocese of Wellington, the Columban Missionaries are preparing the steps in opening Douglas' cause for sainthood. He is honored for his steadfast devotion to his religious duties, and stands with Mother Mary Joseph Aubert and Emmet McHardy as one of the New Zealand Catholic Church’s three models of sanctity.
