= Missionary Society of St. Columban =

Roman Catholic society of apostolic life

- To be a pilgrim for Christ
- Abbreviation: Post-nominal letters: S.S.C.M.E.
- Formation: 29 June 1918; 108 years ago
- Founders: Fr. Edward Galvin; Fr. John Blowick
- Founded at: Maynooth, Ireland officialized in Rome
- Type: Society of Apostolic Life of Pontifical Right (for Men)
- Headquarters: 3 Ma Yau Tong Village, Po Lam Road, Tseung Kwan O, Hong Kong, S.A.R.
- Members: 332 (2024)
- Society Leader: Fr. Andrei Paz, SSC
- Patron saint: Saint Columban
- Website: Official website

The Missionary Society of St. Columban (Latin: Societas Sancti Columbani pro Missionibus ad Exteros) (abbreviated as S.S.C.M.E. or SSC), commonly known as the Columbans, is a missionary Catholic society of apostolic life of Pontifical Right founded in Ireland in 1917 and approved by the Holy See in 1918. Initially it was known as the Maynooth Mission to China. Members may be priests, seminarians or lay workers. Fr John Blowick, one of the two founders of the Society, also founded the Missionary Sisters of St. Columban to share in their work. The society is dedicated to St. Columbanus. The current international headquarters is in Ma Yau Tong Village, Hong Kong, S.A.R.

== Foundation ==
The Society was founded through the inspiration of the Reverend (later Bishop) Edward Galvin of Ireland (1882–1956). Galvin had considered serving as a missionary as a young man, but he was dissuaded by the concerns of his parents over such a life. He entered St Patrick's College (usually called Maynooth Seminary) near Dublin to study for the priesthood for his native Diocese of Cork, and was ordained in 1909. Due to an oversupply of clergy for that diocese, his bishop suggested that Galvin offer his service in the United States, until such time as there would be an opening in Cork. Galvin followed his advice and went to the Roman Catholic Diocese of Brooklyn in New York City, where he was assigned to Holy Rosary Parish.

While serving there, Galvin came to know Fr. John M. Fraser, a Canadian priest, who stayed there while en route back to China. Galvin shared with Fraser his interest serving in China. Galvin told Fraser that he had read everything he could about that nation in the Brooklyn Public Library and asked to accompany Fraser back to China. Fraser discouraged Galvin's interest but finally told him that he would need the authorization of his bishop for this action. Galvin wrote and received this permission. Galvin departed for China on 25 February 1912.

=== Mission to China ===
Galvin first traveled to Toronto, Ontario, Canada, to meet Fraser. Together they traveled across the country to Vancouver, where they set sail for China on the RMS Empress of India (1890). He then began to serve in Zhejiang (then spelled Chekiang), where he spent the next four years. During that time, Galvin was appalled at the poverty and began to request help and assistance from his connections back in Ireland. He was even more appalled by what he called their 'spiritual poverty'. Here were millions of friendly and industrious people who, because of the lack of missionaries, knew nothing of Jesus Christ.

He was joined in 1916 by two other priests, Frs. Patrick O'Reilly and Joseph O'Leary. The three soon realized that some kind of organized effort would be needed to adequately deal with the situation. His new colleagues urged Galvin to return to Ireland to establish a new missionary Society. Galvin was hesitant but eventually felt called to take this step.

In June 1916, Galvin through to the United States on his way back to Ireland. He met with bishops and priests everywhere he went, presenting his proposal. He found general support and encouragement. He arrived in Ireland that August, where he proceeded to his alma mater, Maynooth, and began to recruit among the seminarians there for his proposed society. A local Curate, Thomas Roynane, introduced Galvin to one of the seminary faculty, John Blowick, who agreed to join the endeavor and was to prove an important contributor to the development of the Society. Within two months of his arrival, Galvin had recruited five more priests, bringing the new Maynooth Mission to China to a total of eight members.

=== The Society ===
Galvin then presented his proposal to the Holy See, which gave its blessing. Galvin and Blowick spent 1917 laying the foundations for the society. Formal approval for the group, now named the Society of St. Columban, was given by Rome on 29 June 1918, and a new seminary was immediately founded in Ireland to train new members for the missions. In the United States, a house soon was opened near Omaha, Nebraska, where another seminary was opened within a few years. The Society grew to number 40 priests and 60 seminarians by 1920. Galvin then led the first band of the Society to open their mission in the Hanyang District (modern day Wuhan, China). Galvin was named Apostolic Prefect of the Apostolic Prefecture of Hanyang by the Holy See in 1923 and later made the Apostolic Vicar of the promoted Apostolic Vicariate of Hanyang in 1927, with Galvin being consecrated as its titular bishop (it became a diocese under him in 1946, suffragan of Hankou).

As they began their work, the missionaries encountered various calamities to which the region was subject, ranging from famines to flooding. They also soon found themselves in the middle of a civil war between the forces of the Guominjun Nationalist Army and the Chinese Communist Party, which lasted for the next three decades. This social instability allowed warlords to flourish and mission stations were routinely threatened by bandits. Supplies were often stolen en route and mission workers were frequently kidnapped. On 15 July 1929, Communist Army bandits captured Columban Fr Timothy Leonard. After a few days as a prisoner, they murdered him. Others, though, were taken captive and released, but one, Father Cornelius Tierney, died after three months of harsh captivity. In the fall of 1932, Chiang Kai-shek's nationalist republican troops began attacking the Communists with a vigor never seen before. The Communists fell back on all fronts, and, once more, people could move about with relative safety.

"The reign of terror," wrote one Columban, "far from weakening the appeal of the Catholic Church in this area, seems to have strengthened it." It was an extraordinary time as thousands expressed a sincere desire to enter the Church.

In 1933, the Holy See designated a new territory for the Columbans and Fr Patrick Cleary was appointed in charge of the Apostolic Vicariate of Nancheng (in Nancheng County, south of Hanyang). The Japanese invasion of China in 1937 saw the Society challenged to care for both civilians and soldiers, as major outbreaks of Cholera swept the populace. This was soon followed by the outbreak of World War II, when members of the Society from the Allies of World War II had to be repatriated or face house arrest. The war had just ended when it became clear that Communist forces under Mao Tse-tung would soon defeat the Nationalists under Chiang Kai-shek. In 1946, the Holy See entrusted a new mission, known as Huchow, to the Columban Fathers.

Three years later, the Communists took over this area, and, before long, they were in control of all of China. Several Columbans were thrown into jail and eventually all the Columban priests and Sisters were expelled. Bishops Galvin and Cleary were expelled in 1952.

By 1954, all 146 Columbans serving in China had been "expelled forever". On 19 September 1952, a man crossed the border from Communist China into the British enclave of Hong Kong. His forty years of missionary service had come to an end, and Bishop Galvin was labelled a "criminal". Three and a half years later, he died.

== Extension of the mission beyond China ==
From 1929 onwards, the Society extended its mission to the Philippines (1929), Korea (1933), Burma (1936) and Japan (1948).

The Society was active for many years in Australia, mainly in support of the mission to China.

When mainland China was closed to missionaries in the 1950s, the Society responded to the urgent call from Latin America and Columbans went to new urban settlements in Peru and Chile. The Society also responded to the missionary needs of the Church in Fiji (1952).

Still more recently, the Society has gone to Pakistan, Taiwan, Brazil, Jamaica and Belize. Due to diminishing resources, the Society had to withdraw its commitment to Belize, Jamaica and Brazil.

Columbans first went to Pakistan in 1979 at the request of the Bishop of Lahore in Punjab Province and in 1983, the Columbans began to work in the Roman Catholic Diocese of Hyderabad in Sindh province.

== Notable Columbans ==
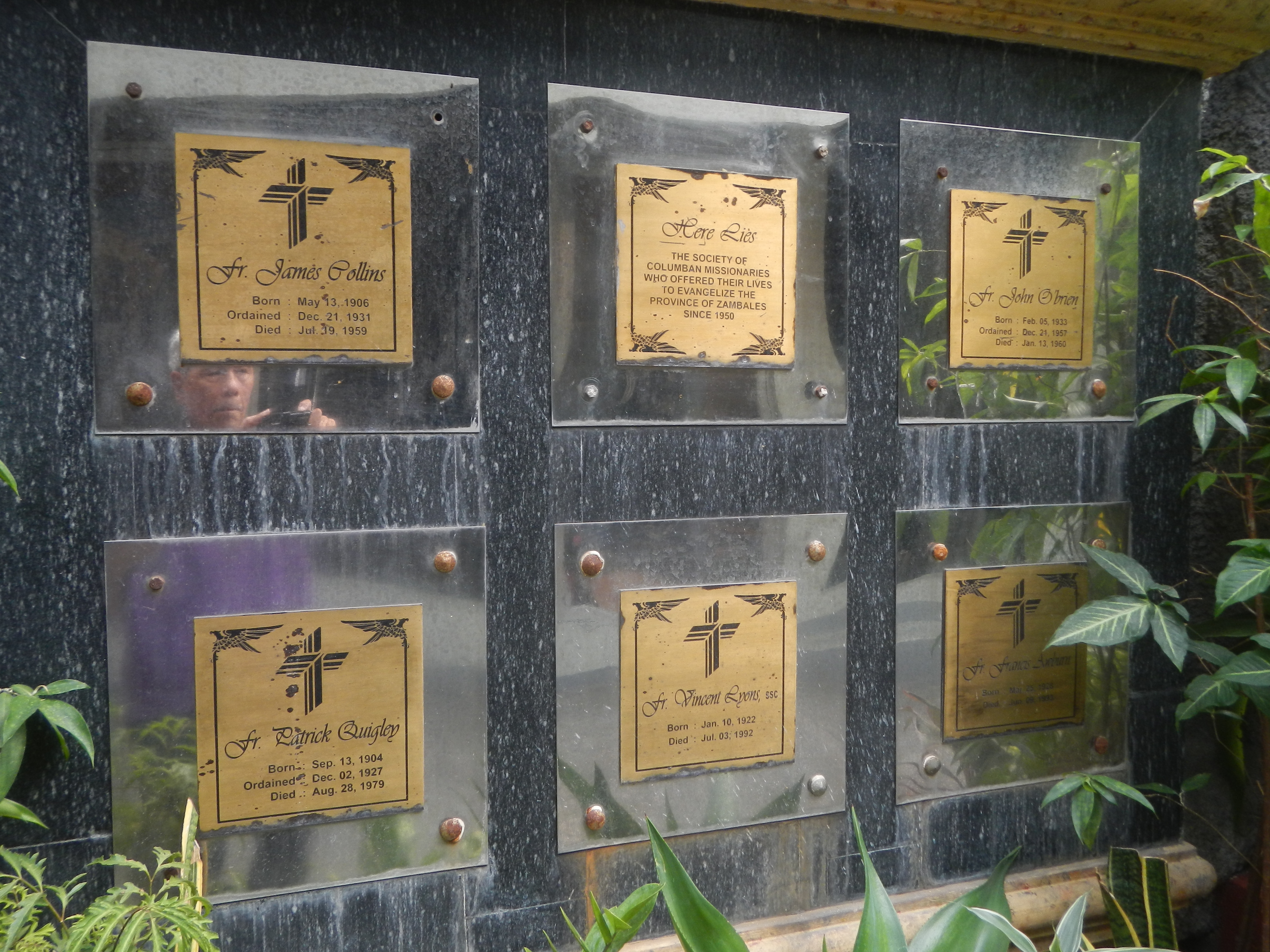
Plaques in memory of several Columban priests, Olongapo, Philippines.

=== Superiors general ===
No.	Name	Country	Term start	Term end	Note
1	Bishop Edward J. Galvin	Ireland	-	1924	Founder of the society, see above, also first bishop of Hanyang
2	Michael O'Dwyer,	Ireland	1924	1947	
3	Jeremiah Dennehy	Ireland	1947	1952	
4	Timothy Connolly	Ireland	1952	1962	
5	James Kielt	Ireland	1962	1970	
6	Richard Steinhilber	United States	1970	1976	First Superior general outside of Europe
7	Tony O'Brien	Ireland	1976	1982	
8	Bernard Cleary	Australia	1982	1988	First superior general from Oceania Region
9	Nicholas Murray	Ireland	1988	2000	
10	Brendan O'Sullivan	United States	2000	2006	
11	Tommy Murphy	Ireland	2006	September 20, 2012	
12	Kevin O'Neill	Australia	September 20, 2012	September 22, 2018	
13	Tim Mulroy	Ireland	September 22, 2018	July 6, 2024	
14	Andrei Paz	Philippines	July 6, 2024	~ present	First Superior general from Asia

=== Prelates from their ranks ===
(by year of demise)

- 1949: Owen McPolin (임 오엔), Apostolic Prefect emeritus of Kwoszu South Korea)
- 1952: Patrizio Tommaso Brennan (안 파트리치오), Apostolic Prefect of Gwangju 광주 (South Korea)
- 1956 Edward J. Galvin (Society founder, see above, first bishop of Hanyang 11 April 1946 – 23 February 1956)
- 1958: Fr. Patrizio Usher, Apostolic Prefect of Bhamo (Myanmar)
- 1970: Patrick Cleary (利伯高), Bishop of Nancheng 南城 (China)
- 1970: Thomas F. Quinlan (구 토마), Bishop emeritus of Chuncheon 춘천 (South Korea)
- 1976: Harold Henry, D.D. (현 하롤드), first Roman Catholic Archbishop emeritus of Kwangju/ Gwangju 광주 (South Korea)(1962–1971) and Apostolic Administrator of Jeju 제주 (South Korea)
- 1983: Henry Byrne, Bishop emeritus of Iba (Philippines)
- 1991: Patrick H. Cronin, Metropolitan Archbishop emeritus of Cagayan de Oro (Philippines)
- 1994: Thomas Stewart (박 토마), Bishop emeritus of Chuncheon 춘천 (South Korea)
- 1997: John J. Dooley, Apostolic Delegate emeritus to Indochina
- 2000: John James Howe, Bishop emeritus of Myitkyina (Myanmar)
- 2010: James Edward Michaels (권야고보), Auxiliary Bishop emeritus of Wheeling–Charleston (USA)

=== Columban Martyrs ===
- Father Patrick Thomas Brennan, Prefect Apostolic of Kwangju, a prisoner who was killed by North Korean forces, 24 September 1950, along with Fr. Cusack and Fr. O'Brien.
- Father Frank Canavan, died in a Communist internment camp in Korea in 1950.
- Father Anthony (Tony) Collier (1913–1950), killed by North Korean forces, 27 June 1950, first non-Korean killed during the Korean War.
- Father Thomas Cusack, parish priest of Mokpo, a prisoner who was killed by North Korean forces, 24 September 1950.
- Father John O'Brien, priest of Mokpo, a prisoner who was killed by North Korean forces, 24 September 1950.
- Father Francis Douglas (1910–1943), New Zealand missionary murdered by Japanese soldiers the Philippines.
- Father Rufus Halley, missionary to the Philippines, who was murdered in 2001
- Father Cornelius Tierney kidnapped in China, died in captivity in 1931
- Father Timothy Leonard killed when Chinese Communist bandits attacked his church in 1929
- Father Peter Fallon kidnapped and killed by Japanese forces in 1945.
- Father John Heneghan kidnapped and killed by Japanese forces in 1945
- Father Thomas Flynn killed by Huk Communists in 1950 in the Philippines
- Father John Walsh, missionary priest, killed in Burma in 1964 by pro-government forces.

=== Other notable Columbans ===
- Father John Blowick (co-founder and second superior general)
- Father W. Aedan McGrath, missionary to PR China who suffered false imprisonment in the early 1950s
- Father James Stuart, who saved the lives of many refugees and American airmen in Northern Burma during World War II. In appreciation of the valuable service he rendered British and American Intelligence, the "Fighting Father", as he was referred to afterwards, was awarded the O.B.E.
- Father Niall O'Brien, missionary to the Philippines who suffered false imprisonment in the "Negros Nine" case of the 1980s.
- Father Peter Nguyen Van Hung, anti-human trafficking activist in Taiwan.
- Father Shay Cullen, campaigner for the elimination of child prostitution in the Philippines, and defender of human rights, co-founder of the PREDA Foundation
- Father Robert McCulloch, an Australian who served in Pakistan from 1978 to 2011. He was decorated by the Government of Pakistan for his services to health and education in 2012.
- Father Seán McDonagh SSC, is an Irish Columban missionary priest and Eco-theologian.
- Father Peter Quinn, all-Ireland winning Gaelic footballer with Mayo

== Timeline ==
- 1918 – Formal approval of Maynooth Mission to China
- 1918 – Seminary founded in Shurle, County Galway
- 1920 – First Mission to China
- 1921 – Columban house opened in Melbourne, Australia
- 1922 – Opening of Columban Seminary in Bellevue, Nebraska, USA
- 1927 – Dowdstown House, Navan, County Meath, bought by Society
- 1929 – Mission to Philippines
- 1933 – Mission to Korea
- 1936 – Mission to Burma
- 1941 – Society moved completely from Shrule to Navan
- 1948 – Mission to Japan
- 1950 – Malate/Manila Martyrs, Columbans Fallon, Heneghan, Kelly and Monaghan killed in Philippines
- 1950 – Columbans Collier, Reilly, Maginn, Cannavan, Brennan, Cusack, and O'Brien killed in Korean War
- 1951 – Mission to Fiji commenced
- 1952 – Missions to Chile and Peru
- 1954 – Columbans expelled from China
- 1979 – Mission to Pakistan and Mission to Taiwan
- 1979 – Columbans leave Burma
- 1985 – Mission to Brazil commenced
- 1986 – Missions to Jamaica and Belize
- 1999 – Mission to US/Mexico Border
- 2008 – General Council moves from Ireland to Hong Kong
- 2016 – Mission to Myanmar (formerly Burma) reopens
- 2018 – Centenary Celebrations

== Seminaries ==
=== Dalgan Park, Shrule, County Galway (1918–1941) ===
In 1918 the society established St Columban's College, Dalgan Park, Shrule, on the Galway/Mayo border, as their seminary. The seminary moved in 1941 to Dowdstown House, Navan, County Meath.

=== Dalgan Park, Navan, County Meath ===
Dowdstown House, Navan, County Meath, was bought in 1927 by the Columbans, from the Taylor family, and the Columbans moved in in 1929 before moving completely from Shrule in 1941 and renamed it Dalgan Park. Dalgan Park Navan was the headquarters of the society until 1967 when it moved to Dublin, and in 1981 it was designated a retreat centre for the Diocese. The Irish Missionaries Union Institute, and the Columban Lay Missionaries are based in Dalgan Park. The Columban Archive is stored at Navan as well. The Columbans ran a part-time postgrad diploma in theology (Education & Religion) and a MA in Theology (Ecology & Religion). The MA in Ecology and Faith was in collaboration with Lampeter College at the University of Wales, commenced in September 2002. and in 2009 the course moved to All Hallows College and was validated by DCU.

=== St Columban's House of Studies in Templeogue, Dublin (1958–1972) ===
Templeogue House in Dublin, was purchased in 1958 by the Columbans as a House of Studies, where students would attend University College Dublin for secular degrees as part of the formation. Students would return to Dalgan Park for their Theology studies. The order donated land in Templeogue for the establishment of a school, which was opened in 1975 and named in Columban founder Bishop Galvin's honour. The order sold Templeogue House in 1972.

=== Columban Seminary Omaha, Nebraska ===
A house was opened in Nebraska in 1918. In 1921 construction began on the Columban seminary in Bellevue, Nebraska. It was dedicated in June 1922 by Archbishop Jeremiah J. Harty of Omaha, and accepted its first students in September 1922.

== Columban Lay Missionaries ==
Columban Lay Missionaries are lay people who work alongside the Missionary Society and Missionary Sisters, offering to work on cross-cultural missionary activity for a period of time.

== Far East magazine ==
Far East, founded in 1918, is the official magazine of the Missionary Society of St Columban. It is published seven times a year. Fr. John Heneghan, who was murdered by the Japanese in Manila during World War II, was the magazine's first editor.

In 2016, Sarah MacDonald became the first lay and first female editor of the magazine. Other editors have included Dr. Edward (Ned) Maguire (1925–1936), Fr. Daniel Conneely (1936–1965), Fr. Edward Percy Walshe (1970–1977), Fr. Sean A. Dunne (1977–1986), Fr Cyril Lovett SSC (2003–2016), Fr Alo Connaughton (1993–2003), Fr. W.S. McGoldrick (US Far East) and Fr Michael O'Neill SSC (who also edited the in house Columban publication Columban Intercom).

The Australian and Nebraska Columban Societies publish Far East Magazines. The Far East magazine in the US was renamed The Columban Mission.

== Sources ==
- St Columban's Missionary Magazine –
- GigaCatholic
- Catholic Liturgical Calendar –
- William E. Barrett. The Red Lacquered Gate.
- Jack Barnard, M.C. The Hump: The Incredible Courage of War Weary Men in the Last Evacuation of Burma.
