= Thomas Flynn (Columban priest) =

Rev. Thomas Flynn SSC, was an Irish missionary priest, who was killed by Hukbalahap communist rebels in 1950 in the Philippines.

== Biography ==
Thomas Flynn was born on 5 November 1908 in Sixmilebridge, County Clare, Ireland.

In 1928 Flynn went to Clonliffe College, Dublin to be educated for priesthood, moving in 1931 to St. Patrick's College, Maynooth. He was ordained a priest for the Dublin diocese in 1935. From 1941, he served as chaplain to the Gurkhas in the British Army. He joined the Missionary Society of St. Columban Mission to China in 1947, and was posted to the Philippines in 1948.

== Death ==
On 30 October 1950, Flynn was taken from his parish in Labrador, Pangasinan, Philippines by Hukbalahap Communist guerrillas, and killed. He was 41 years old. In 2003, his remains were exhumed and interred in the family plot in Ballysheen, County Clare. In attendance at his interment were 30 Columban fathers and his sister, Sr Marie Flynn of the Medical Missionaries of Mary.

== See also ==
- Catholic Church in the Philippines
