= Thomas F. Quinlan =

Irish priest (died 1970)

Thomas F. Quinlan S.S.C.M.E.
- Bishop of Chunchon
- Church: Catholic Church
- Diocese: Diocese of Chunchon
- In office: 8 December 1940 – 16 November 1965
- Predecessor: Prefecture established
- Successor: Thomas Stewart
- Other post: Titular Bishop of Bocconia (1965-1970)
- Previous post: Titular Bishop of Furnos Maior (1955-1962)

Orders
- Ordination: 2 February 1920 by Thomas O'Dea
- Consecration: 23 November 1955 by Maximilian von Fürstenberg

Personal details
- Born: 13 September 1896 Borrisoleigh, County Tipperary, United Kingdom of Great Britain and Ireland
- Died: 31 December 1970 (aged 74)

Styles of Thomas F. Quinlan
- Reference style: The Most Reverend
- Spoken style: Your Excellency
- Religious style: Bishop

Thomas F. Quinlan, S.S.C.M.E. (13 September 1896 in Borrisoleigh – 31 December 1970) was an Irish-born Catholic missionary prelate who served as Bishop of Chuncheon from 1945 until 1966. He was a member of the Missionary Society of St. Columban.

== Biography ==
Quinlan was a native of Borrisoleigh, Co. Tipperary, and studied for the priesthood for four years in St. Patrick's College, Thurles, before joining the Columban Fathers. He was ordained a priest in 1920 along with three others and was posted to the Han-yang province in China.

During his time in China the missionaries were a target for kidnapping and violence. After returning to Ireland, Quinlan was again posted to Korea, where he was stationed at the outbreak of the Second World War, he was appointed Bishop of Chuncheon in 1945.

Quinlan was captured and imprisoned by North Korea during the Korean War, and he was held with Bishop Patrick James Byrne, who died in prison; Quinlan had to bury him. He returned to South Korea in 1954 as Regent to the Apostolic Delegation. He retired from his bishopric in 1966 and died on New Year's Eve 1970.
