= Diocese of Chuncheon =

Latin Catholic archdiocese in Korea

Coordinates: 37.8667°N 127.7330°E

Diocese of Chuncheon Dioecesis Chuncheonensis 춘천교구

Location
- Country: South Korea partly in North Korea
- Territory: Northern part of Gangwon
- Ecclesiastical province: Seoul
- Metropolitan: Seoul

Statistics
- Area: 12,016 km^{2} (4,639 sq mi)
- Population: Total; Catholics: (as of 2017); 1,139,033; 89,446 (7.9%)
- Parishes: 61

Information
- Denomination: Catholic
- Sui iuris church: Latin Church
- Rite: Roman Rite
- Established: 25 April 1939 (86 years ago)
- Cathedral: Cathedral of the Sacred Heart of Jesus in Chuncheon

Current leadership
- Pope: Leo XIV
- Bishop: Simon Kim Ju-young
- Metropolitan Archbishop: Andrew Yeom Soo-jung
- Bishops emeritus: Lucas Kim Woon-hoe

Map

Website
- cccatholic.or.kr

The Diocese of Chunchon (also romanized Chuncheon and Ch’unch’on, Latin: Dioecesis Chuncheonensis) is a Latin Catholic diocese of the Catholic Church in South Korea. A suffragan in the ecclesiastical province of the Metropolitan Archdiocese of Seoul, it has ecclesiastic authority over the administrative province of Gangwon-do.

Its cathedral episcopal see mother church is Jungnim-dong Cathedral in Chuncheon.

== History ==
The jurisdiction was erected on April 25, 1939 as a missionary pre-diocesan jurisdiction on territory split off from the Apostolic Vicariate of Seoul under the name Apostolic Prefecture of Shunsen, the city's name during the period of Japanese rule of Korea.

It was renamed the Apostolic Prefecture of Chunchon on July 16, 1950 and made an Apostolic vicariate on September 20, 1955.

It was elevated to diocesan status on March 10, 1962.

On 22 March 1965, it lost territory to establish the Diocese of Wonju 원주

== Ordinaries ==
=== Apostolic Prefects of Chunchon ===
- Owen McPolin (1939–1940)
- Thomas F. Quinlan, S.S.C.M.E. (1940–1942)
- Paul Noh Gi-nam (1942–1945; apostolic administrator)
- Thomas F. Quinlan, S.S.C.M.E. (1945–1955)

=== Apostolic Vicars of Chunchon ===
- Thomas F. Quinlan, S.S.C.M.E. (1955–1962)

=== Bishops of Chunchon ===
- Thomas F. Quinlan, S.S.C.M.E. (1962–1965)
- Thomas Stewart, S.S.C.M.E. (1966–1994)
- John Chang Yik (1994–2010)
- Lucas Kim Woon-hoe (2010–2020)
- Simon Kim Ju-young (2020–present)
