= Edward Galvin =

Edward J. Galvin (November 23, 1882 - February 23, 1956) was founder of the Missionary Society of St. Columban and the first Bishop of Hanyang, China.

== Early life ==
Edward J. Galvin was born at Newcestown, County Cork, Ireland, on 23 November 1882. He was ordained a Catholic priest at St Patrick's College, Maynooth, County Kildare, in 1909 for his home diocese of Cork. He spent his first three years as a priest 'on loan' to the diocese of Brooklyn, New York. While there, in January 1912, he met Father Fraser, who was en route back to China.

== China 1912 – 1916 ==
In February 1912, Fr. 'Ned' Galvin left Brooklyn for China. He went first to Toronto to join Fr. Fraser and together, they traveled from Vancouver to Shanghai on the Empress of India. He lived and worked with the French Vincentians in Zhejiang (1912–16). In 1916, he returned to Ireland to found a society of missionary priests dedicated to the conversion of China, the Missionary Society of St. Columban.

On 4 September 1916, he met a young professor from the Maynooth seminary, Fr. John Blowick, at Fr. Tom Ronayne's lodgings in Monkstown, Dublin. On 10 October 1916, they received permission from the Irish hierarchy to establish a "mission house for the training of Irish missionaries for China". After a brief period promoting the Society in Ireland, Edward Galvin left for the United States in 1917 to establish the Society there.

== China 1920 – 1953 ==
He returned to Ireland to lead the first band of his missionaries to China (1920). From his arrival in China until his expulsion in 1952, Galvin would have experienced some good years, but difficulties and dangers predominated: a corrupt Chinese government, local warlords and banditry, floods, drought, and the Japanese invasion, among others. He survived the rigors of World War II, but the end of the war did not mean an end to conflicts. In 1947, he wrote "the hope has gone from me; the war was bad, but post-war problems are the devil entirely."

Expelled from China, he returned to his native Ireland in 1953 and retired to Dalgan Park, Navan, County Meath, broken in spirit. He died of leukemia at St. Columbans College, Dalgan Park, on 23 February 1956, and is buried there.
