= Roman Catholic Diocese of Hanyang =

Roman Catholic diocese in China

Diocese of Hanyang Dioecesis Haniamensis 天主教汉阳教区

Location
- Country: China
- Ecclesiastical province: Hankou
- Metropolitan: Hankou

Statistics
- Population: Total; Catholics: (as of 1949); 4,000,000; 55,000 (1.4%)

Information
- Rite: Latin Rite
- Cathedral: Cathedral of St Columban in Hanyang

Current leadership
- Pope: Leo XIV
- Bishop: Sede Vacante
- Metropolitan Archbishop: Sede Vacante
- Apostolic Administrator: Chen Tian-huai

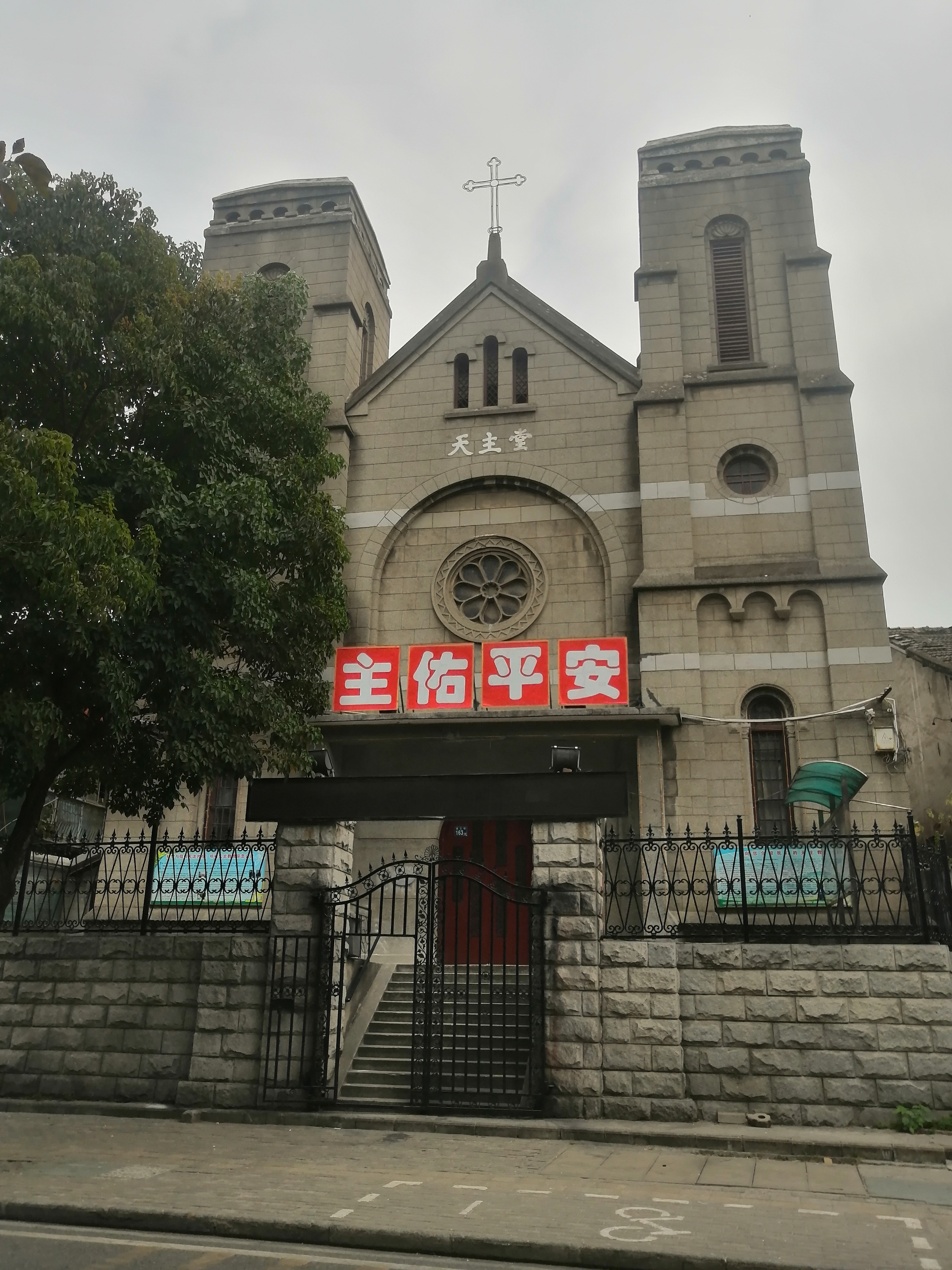
St. Columban's Cathedral, Hanyang

The Roman Catholic Diocese of Hanyang (Latin: Haniamen(sis), Chinese: 漢陽) is a Latin suffragan diocese in the ecclesiastical province of Hankou in PR China, yet still depends on the Roman missionary Congregation for the Evangelization of Peoples.

Its cathedral episcopal see is the Cathedral of St. Columban in Hanyang (Wuhan), Hubei.

== History ==
- December 12, 1923: Established as Apostolic Prefecture of Hanyang 漢陽, on territory split off from the then Apostolic Vicariate of Eastern Hupeh 湖北東境
- July 14, 1927: Promoted as Apostolic Vicariate of Hanyang 漢陽
- April 11, 1946: Promoted as Diocese of Hanyang 漢陽, losing its exempt missionary status

== Ordinaries ==
(all Roman Rite)

Apostolic Prefects of Hanyang 漢陽

- Fr. Edward J. Galvin, S.S.C.M.E. (later Bishop) (November 1, 1924 – July 14, 1927)

Apostolic Vicar of Hanyang 漢陽

- Edward J. Galvin, S.S.C.M.E. (see above July 14, 1927 – April 11, 1946 see below), Titular Bishop of Myrina (1927.07.14 – 1946.04.11)

Suffragan Bishops of Hanyang 漢陽

- Edward J. Galvin, S.S.C.M.E. (see above April 11, 1946 – February 23, 1956)
- uncanonical: Anthony Tu Shi-hua (涂世華) (1959 – ..., without papal mandate)
- Peter Zhang Bairen (1984 clandestine consecration - October 12, 2005)
- Apostolic Administrator Chen Tian-huai (陳天懷) (2005 – ...)

== Sources and external links ==
- GCatholic.org ^{[self-published]}
- Catholic Hierarchy ^{[self-published]}
