= Nancheng County =

Nancheng County 南城县
- County
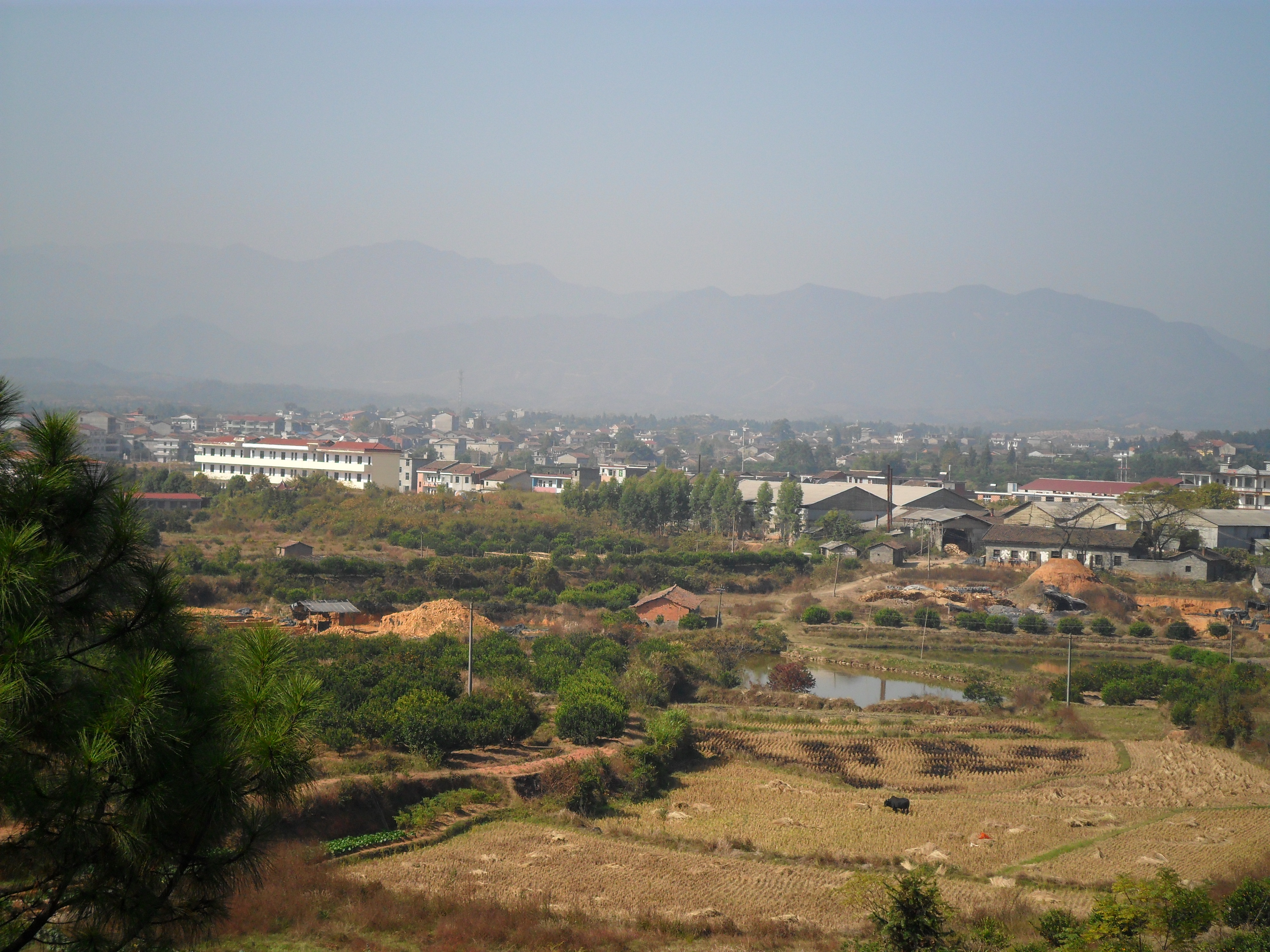

- Location of Nancheng County (red) in Fuzhou City (light blue) and Jiangxi
- Coordinates: 27°34′11″N 116°38′13″E
- Country: People's Republic of China
- Province: Jiangxi
- Prefecture-level city: Fuzhou
- Established: 202 BCE

Area
  - Total: 1,698 km^{2} (656 sq mi)
- Elevation: 70 m (230 ft)

Population (2019)
  - Total: 316,900
  - Density: 186.6/km^{2} (483.4/sq mi)
- Time zone: UTC+8 (China Standard)
- Postal code: 344700
- Area code: 0794
- Website: jxnc.gov.cn

Nancheng (Chinese: 南城县; pinyin: Nánchéng; lit. 'south city') is a county of eastern Jiangxi province, People's Republic of China. It is under the jurisdiction of the prefecture-level city of Fuzhou. Historically it has been known as Jianchangfu (Kienchang) (建昌府).

== Administrative divisions ==
In the present, Nancheng County has 9 towns and 3 townships.

9 towns

- Jianchang (建昌镇)
- Zhuliang (株良镇)
- Shangtang (上唐镇)
- Lita (里塔镇)
- Hongmen (洪门镇)
- Shazhou (沙洲镇)
- Longhu (龙湖镇)
- Xinfengjie (新丰街镇)
- Wanfang (万坊镇)

3 townships

- Xujia (徐家乡)
- Tianjingyuan (天井源乡)
- Xunxi (浔溪乡)

== Demographics ==
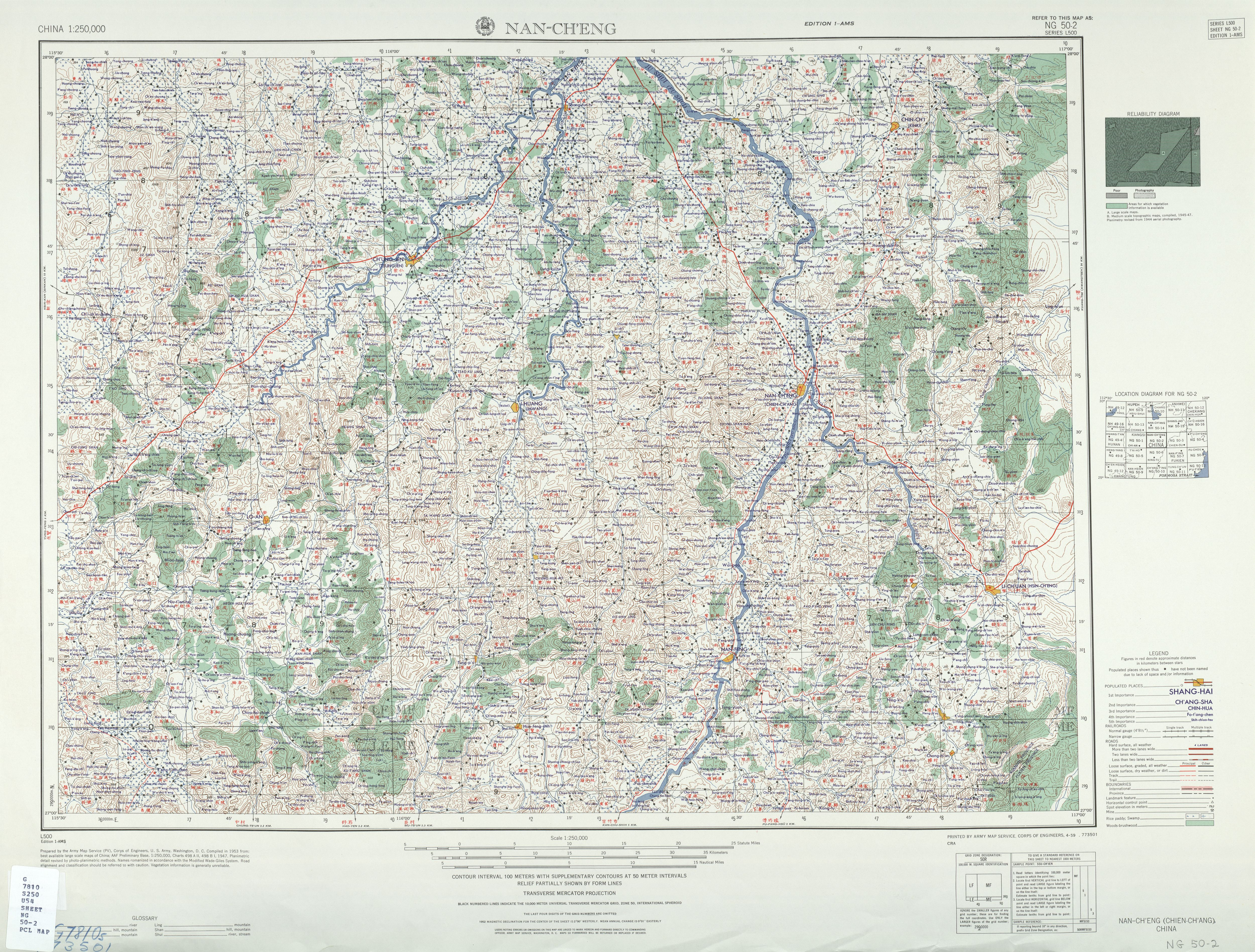
Map including Nancheng (labeled as 南城 NAN-CH'ENG (CHIEN-CH'ANG) 建昌) (AMS, 1953)

The population of the district was 287,466 in 1999.

== Climate ==
Nancheng County has a humid subtropical climate (Köppen Cfa), with long, humid, very hot summers and cool and drier winters with occasional cold snaps. The monthly 24-hour average temperature ranges from 6.0 °C (42.8 °F) in January to 29.1 °C (84.4 °F) in July, with an annual mean of 18.04 °C (64.5 °F); the frost-free period lasts 265 days. The average annual precipitation is around 1,740 mm (69 in). Winter begins somewhat sunny and dry but becomes progressively wetter and cloudier; spring begins especially gloomy, and from March to June each of the months averages more than 190 mm (7.5 in) of rainfall. After the heavy rains subside in June, summer is especially sunny. Autumn is warm to mild and relatively dry. With monthly percent possible sunshine ranging from 20% in March to 58% in July, the county receives 1,635 hours of bright sunshine annually.

Climate data for Nancheng County, elevation 81 m (266 ft), (1991–2020 normals, extremes 1952–present)
Month	Jan	Feb	Mar	Apr	May	Jun	Jul	Aug	Sep	Oct	Nov	Dec	Year
Record high °C (°F)	27.5 (81.5)	30.0 (86.0)	31.8 (89.2)	35.1 (95.2)	37.5 (99.5)	37.6 (99.7)	40.5 (104.9)	41.5 (106.7)	39.0 (102.2)	39.0 (102.2)	32.9 (91.2)	28.7 (83.7)	41.5 (106.7)
Mean daily maximum °C (°F)	10.2 (50.4)	13.5 (56.3)	17.2 (63.0)	23.5 (74.3)	27.8 (82.0)	30.3 (86.5)	34.1 (93.4)	33.5 (92.3)	29.8 (85.6)	24.9 (76.8)	19.1 (66.4)	12.9 (55.2)	23.1 (73.5)
Daily mean °C (°F)	6.3 (43.3)	9.0 (48.2)	12.7 (54.9)	18.7 (65.7)	23.2 (73.8)	26.1 (79.0)	29.2 (84.6)	28.5 (83.3)	25.1 (77.2)	19.8 (67.6)	14.1 (57.4)	8.3 (46.9)	18.4 (65.2)
Mean daily minimum °C (°F)	3.7 (38.7)	6.0 (42.8)	9.6 (49.3)	15.3 (59.5)	19.8 (67.6)	23.2 (73.8)	25.6 (78.1)	25.2 (77.4)	21.8 (71.2)	16.2 (61.2)	10.6 (51.1)	5.0 (41.0)	15.2 (59.3)
Record low °C (°F)	−7.8 (18.0)	−7.3 (18.9)	−2.9 (26.8)	3.4 (38.1)	9.6 (49.3)	14.1 (57.4)	19.3 (66.7)	17.7 (63.9)	11.3 (52.3)	2.2 (36.0)	−3.7 (25.3)	−10.9 (12.4)	−10.9 (12.4)
Average precipitation mm (inches)	82.5 (3.25)	100.3 (3.95)	206.6 (8.13)	220.4 (8.68)	254.3 (10.01)	341.0 (13.43)	182.3 (7.18)	134.9 (5.31)	86.6 (3.41)	57.2 (2.25)	89.0 (3.50)	65.3 (2.57)	1,820.4 (71.67)
Average precipitation days (≥ 0.1 mm)	13.7	13.5	18.3	17.8	17.3	16.9	10.9	12.2	9.0	7.8	9.8	10.3	157.5
Average snowy days	2.3	1.2	0.2	0	0	0	0	0	0	0	0	0.7	4.4
Average relative humidity (%)	81	80	82	79	79	82	74	77	79	78	79	78	79
Mean monthly sunshine hours	76.6	79.1	82.1	108.0	133.2	137.5	240.7	215.0	173.7	159.4	125.0	117.7	1,648
Percentage possible sunshine	23	25	22	28	32	33	57	53	47	45	39	37	37
Source 1: China Meteorological Administration extremes
Source 2: Weather China

== Transportation ==
- Xiangtang–Putian Railway
