= Joseph Son Sam-seok =

Most Reverend Joseph Son Sam-seok
- Bishop of Busan
- Church: Catholic Church
- Diocese: Diocese of Busan
- Appointed: 10 April 2019
- Installed: 4 June 2019
- Predecessor: Paul Hwang Chul-soo
- Successor: Incumbent

Orders
- Ordination: February 6, 1982
- Consecration: July 9, 2010 by Paul Hwang Chul-soo

Personal details
- Born: November 3, 1955 (age 70) Pusan, South Korea
- Motto: Benedicam Deum In Vita Mea

- Korean name
- Hangul: 손삼석
- RR: Son Samseok
- MR: Son Samsŏk

Joseph Son Sam-seok (born November 3, 1955) is a bishop of the Roman Catholic Diocese of Busan.

== Biography ==
Joseph Son Sam-seok was ordained a priest on February 6, 1982. On June 4, 2010, Pope Benedict XVI appointed him Auxiliary Bishop of Busan and Titular Bishop of Fesseë. He was consecrated bishop on July 9, 2010, by Paul Hwang Chul-soo, Bishop of Busan with Thaddeus Cho Hwan-Kil, Auxiliary bishop of Daegu and John Chrisostom Kwon Hyok-ju, Bishop of Andong as Co-Consecrators. Bishop Son Sam-seok had been serving as apostolic administration of diocese of Busan since the resignation of Bishop Paul Hwang Chul-soo in August 2018. He was named Bishop of Busan in April 2019.
