= Diocese of Jeju =

Roman Catholic diocese in South Korea

Coordinates: 33°30′N 126°31′E

Diocese of Jeju Dioecesis Cheiuensis 제주교구

Location
- Country: South Korea
- Territory: Jeju Province
- Ecclesiastical province: Gwangju
- Metropolitan: Gwangju

Statistics
- Area: 1,848 km^{2} (714 sq mi)
- Population: Total; Catholics: (as of 2017); 678,772; 81,411 (12.1%)
- Parishes: 28

Information
- Denomination: Catholic
- Sui iuris church: Latin Church
- Rite: Roman Rite
- Established: 28 June 1971 (54 years ago)
- Cathedral: Immaculate Conception Cathedral, Jeju City

Current leadership
- Pope: Leo XIV
- Bishop: Pius Moon Chang-woo
- Metropolitan Archbishop: Simon Ok Hyun-jin
- Bishops emeritus: Paul Kim Tchang-ryeol; Peter Kang U-il

Map

Website
- diocesecheju.org

The Roman Catholic Diocese of Jeju (제주, also romanized Jeju, Latin: Dioecesis Cheiuensis) is a Latin rite suffragan diocese in the ecclesiastical province of the Metropolitan Archdiocese of Gwangju, South Korea, yet depends on the missionary Dicastery for Evangelization. Its episcopal see and mother church is Immaculate Conception Cathedral in Jeju City.

== History ==
It was created on 28 June 1971 by Pope Paul VI as Apostolic Prefecture of Jeju 제주 / Cheju / 濟州 (正體中文) / Cheiuen(sis) (Latin), exempt, on territory split off from the Archdiocese of Gwangju.

It was elevated on 21 March 1977, also by Pope Paul VI to Diocese of Jeju 제주 / Cheju / 濟州 (正體中文) / Cheiuen(sis) (Latin).

== Statistics ==
As per 2014, it pastorally served 71,845 Catholics (11.9% of 604,670 total) on 1,849 km^{2} in 27 parishes with 51 priests (44 diocesan, 7 religious), 1 deacon, 110 lay religious (7 brothers, 103 sisters) and 17 seminarians.

== Leadership ==
=== Ordinaries ===
- Harold William Henry (28 June 1971 – 1 March 1976; Apostolic Administrator)
- Michael Pak Jeong-il (15 April 1977 – 8 June 1982), appointed Bishop of Jeonju
- Paul Kim Tchang-ryeol (11 November 1983 – 15 July 2002)
- Peter Kang U-il (15 July 2002 – 22 November 2020)
- Pius Moon Chang-woo (22 November 2020 – present)

=== Coadjutor Bishops ===
- Pius Moon Chang-woo (15 August 2017 – 22 November 2020)

== See also ==
- List of Catholic Dioceses in Korea
- Roman Catholicism in South Korea

== Sources and external links ==
- Official site
- GCatholic - data for all sections
- Catholic-Hierarchy
