= Pius Sin Hozel =

South Korean Catholic prelate

Most Reverend Pius Sin Hozel
- Auxiliary Bishop of Busan
- Native name: 신호철 비오
- Church: Catholic Church; Latin Church
- Diocese: Busan
- Appointed: 22 May 2021
- Predecessor: Joseph Son Sam-seok
- Successor: Incumbent
- Other post: Titular bishop of Belesasa

Orders
- Ordination: 3 February 1996
- Consecration: 29 June 2021 by Joseph Son Sam-seok

Personal details
- Born: 3 September 1968 (age 58) Busan, South Korea
- Education: Anselmianum; Gwangju Catholic University
- Motto: SICUT IN CŒLO ET IN TERRA

Pius Sin Hozel is a South Korean Roman Catholic prelate serving as Auxiliary Bishop of Roman Catholic Diocese of Busan, South Korea.

== Early life and education ==
Pius was born on 3 September 1968 in Busan, South Korea. He completed his philosophy and theology from the Catholic University of Gwangju. He acquired a licentiate and doctorate in sacred liturgy from the Pontifical Saint Anselm Athenaeum in Rome.

== Priesthood ==
On 3 February 1996, Hozel was ordained a priest for the Roman Catholic Diocese of Busan.

== Episcopate ==
Hozel was appointed Auxiliary Bishop of Roman Catholic Diocese of Busan and Titular bishop of Belesasa on 22 May 2021 by Pope Francis. He was ordained a bishop on 29 June 2021 by Joseph Son Sam-seok.
