= Daniel Tji Hak-soun =

South Korean bishop (1921–1993)

Most Reverend Daniel Tji Hak Soun
- Bishop of the Roman Catholic Diocese of Wonju
- Church: Catholic Church
- Diocese: Roman Catholic Diocese of Wonju
- Appointed: March 22, 1965
- Predecessor: None
- Successor: James Kim Ji-seok

Orders
- Ordination: December 15, 1952
- Consecration: June 29, 1965

Personal details
- Born: September 9, 1921 Chunghwa County, Kōkai Province, Korea, Empire of Japan
- Died: March 12, 1993 (aged 71)

Korean name
- Hangul: 지학순
- Hanja: 池學淳
- RR: Ji Haksun
- MR: Chi Haksun

Daniel Tji Hak Soun (Korean: 지학순; September 9, 1921 – March 12, 1993) was a bishop of the Roman Catholic Diocese of Wonju.

== Biography ==
Daniel Tji Hak Soun was ordained a priest on December 15, 1952.

On March 22, 1965, Pope Paul VI appointed him Bishop of Wonju. He was consecrated bishop on June 29, 1965 by Antonio del Giudice. Co-consecrators were the Bishop Thomas F. Quinlan of the Diocese of Chunchon and Bishop John A. Choi Jae-seon of the Diocese of Busan.

Tji was associated with Kim Chi-ha and was arrested in 1974 alongside five other priests and a nun over allegations of providing financial support to opponents of the government of Park Chung Hee and sentenced to death. He was sympathetic to the April Revolution and was a leader of the urban poor and supported nonviolent resistance to the regime.
