= Pardy =

Pardy is a surname. Notable people with the surname include:

- Adam Pardy (born 1984), Canadian ice hockey player
- Craig Pardy, Canadian politician from Newfoundland and Labrador
- Ella Pardy (born 1990), Australian Paralympic athlete
- Henry Garfield Pardy, Canadian diplomat
- James Vincent Pardy (1898–1983), American-born Catholic missionary and bishop in South Korea
- Marion Pardy (born 1942), Canadian United Church minister, 37th Moderator of the United Church of Canada 2000–2003
- Rick Pardy (born 1961), American football coach

== See also ==
- Pardy Island Formation, Neoproterozoic geological formation in Newfoundland and Labrador
- Pardi
- Party (disambiguation)
- Purdy (disambiguation)
