= Aloysius Schwartz =

American priest and Venerable (1930–1992)

Venerable Aloysius Schwartz
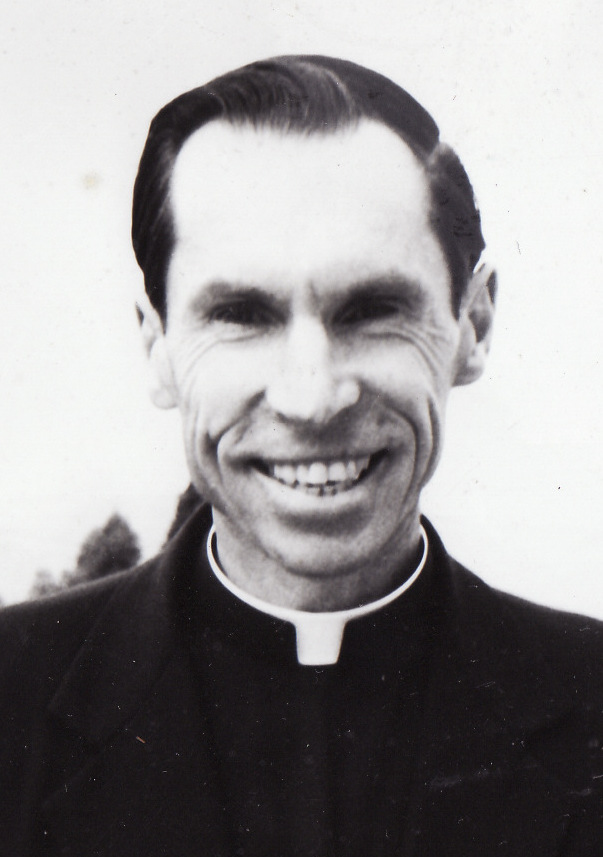
- Born: Aloysius Philip Schwartz; September 18, 1930; Washington, D.C., United States
- Died: March 16, 1992 (aged 61); Manila, Philippines
- Resting place: Chapel of the Our Lady of Poor of Banneux, Sisters of Mary School Girlstown, Silang, Cavite

Aloysius Philip Schwartz (September 18, 1930 – March 16, 1992) was an American Catholic priest who ran social service programs for thousands of orphans in South Korea, the Philippines and Mexico.

Starting with few financial resources, he founded the Sisters of Mary of Banneux and the Brothers of Christ religious orders in South Korea and established numerous homes and schools for orphaned or neglected children. He was declared venerable by Pope Francis.

== Early life ==
Aloysius Schwartz was born in Washington, D.C. on September 18, 1930, to Louis Schwartz and Cedelia Bourassa, the third of seven children. His father sold furniture door-to-door. His mother died of cancer when he was 16 years old. As a child, Schwartz read the comic Boy Commandos, about teenage orphans banding together to fight Nazis. According to Schwartz, it nurtured his desire to do good.

Deciding at a young age to become a priest, Schwartz turned down a scholarship to a Jesuit high school. In 1944, he entered St. Charles, a minor seminary in Catonsville, Maryland.

== Seminary and ordination ==
After finishing at St. Charles, Schwartz enrolled at Maryknoll College in Baltimore, Maryland. While at Maryknoll, he became conscious of the difference between his comfortable life in seminary and the stark existence of poor people around the world. He also realized that Maryknoll was preparing him to become a teacher when he really wanted to be a missionary.

After receiving his Bachelor of Arts degree from Maryknoll, Schwartz applied to and was accepted by the Society of the Auxiliaries of the Missions (SAM), a religious institute in Belgium that prepared priests for missionary work in Africa and Asia. He arrived in Leuven, Belgium, in 1952 to serve with the order while studying theology at Louvain Catholic University. During his summer vacations, he would hitchhike around Europe, staying at monasteries. He also spent time with the rag pickers in Paris.

After finishing his studies in Leuven, Schwartz returned to the United States. He was ordained as a diocesan priest on June 29, 1957, at St. Martin de Tours Church in Washington by Auxiliary Bishop John McNamara. After his ordination, Schwartz petitioned Bishop John A. Choi Jae-seon, the vicar apostolic of the Diocese of Busan, for permission to work there. The Korean War of 1950 to 1953 had reduced hundreds of thousands of people in South Korea into homelessness and grinding poverty. According his biographer, Kevin Wells, Schwartz "...wanted to be the guy cleansing the sores of the leprous with a smile and kind word." Schwartz was accepted by the bishop in South Korea and separated from SAM.

== South Korea ==
On December 8, 1957, Schwartz arrived in Busan, South Korea. As a consequence of the Korean War, there were many widows, orphans, beggars, and street children. Almost one-half of the adult population were not employed productively, so they resorted to selling rags and waste paper, begging, and stealing. Schwartz put in long hours providing ministry and learning Korean in a cold setting with meager food.

Two months after arriving in Busan, Schwartz collapsed while celebrating mass. Diagnosed with hepatitis, he soon realized that he not could receive the medical care he needed in South Korea and needed to return home. Having no money for transportation, he successfully convinced the captain of an American ship to give him free passage. While recovering in the United States, he started giving presentations about the conditions in South Korea to parishes, asking for donations. He also started direct mail campaigns through Korean Relief, Inc, a non-profit he co-founded.

In December 1961, Schwartz returned to South Korea, where he was assigned as pastor of St. Joseph, a poor parish in Songdo. Giving up his rectory for the Benedictine sisters in his parish, he built a small shack for his own residence. To provide teachers and health care workers for the poor, Schwartz founded the religious congregation of the Sisters of Mary on August 15, 1964 in Busan. That same year, he and the sisters opened what he called boystowns and girlstowns, orphanages and schools for homeless children. They also built hospitals and sanatoriums for very needy patients and hostels for homeless and disabled older men, mentally disabled children, and unwed mothers. On May 10, 1981, Schwartz started the Brothers of Christ. a religious institute for men, in South Korea.

== The Philippines and Mexico ==
In 1983, Schwartz received the Ramon Magsaysay Award for International Understanding in Manilla, Philippines. He met Cardinal Jaime Sin, then Archbishop of Manila, who invited him to bring his religious community to aid the poor in the archdiocese.

In 1985, Schwartz founded the Sisters of Mary at Santa Mesa, Manila, expanding his charity programs. Buildings were constructed, and children from the slum and impoverished areas were recruited.

== Illness and death ==
In 1989, Schwartz was diagnosed with amyotrophic lateral sclerosis (ALS). Despite his deteriorating health, he established Boystowns and Girlstowns in Mexico, which he called his "unfinished symphony". His illness made him immobile, and he continued his work in a wheelchair.

Schwartz returned to the Philippines in October 1991, after the inauguration of the first Girlstown and Boystown on October 7, 1991. He died on March 16, 1992, at the Manila Girlstown and was buried at the Silang Boystown (now Girlstown) in Cavite.

== Beatification process ==
The cause of beatification for Aloysius Schwartz was opened at the Manila Cathedral on December 10, 2003. On May 29, 2004, at the Sisters of Mary Girlstown Complex in Cavite, Auxiliary bishop Socrates B. Villegas declared the beatification process of Schwartz to be completed on diocesan level. On October 6, 2012, the Positio Super Vita Virtutibus et Fama Sanctitatis for Schwartz was submitted to Cardinal Angelo Amato, the prefect of the Dicastery for the Causes of Saints in Rome. The Special Congress of the Theological Consultors gave its favorable vote on March 6, 2014. On January 22, 2015, Pope Francis ordered the promulgation of the decree of the heroic virtue of venerable Aloysius Schwartz.

== Legacy ==
The Sisters of Mary and the Brothers of Christ serve the poor in Korea, the Philippines, Mexico, Guatemala, Brazil, Honduras, Tanzania and Kenya. More than 170,000 children have graduated from their boarding schools and entered employment or established businesses and some become priests and religious following the example of Schwartz.
