= John Choi Young-su =

South Korean archbishop (1942–2009)

John Choi Young-su (Korean: 최영수 요한; March 2, 1942 – August 31, 2009) was the South Korean archbishop of the Roman Catholic Archdiocese of Daegu from 2007 to 2009.

Young-su was ordained a Catholic priest on November 6, 1970, and was elevated to auxiliary bishop of the Roman Catholic Archdiocese of Daegu in 2000. He was further appointed the coadjutor archbishop of Daegu on February 3, 2006.

Young-su became archbishop of the Archdiocese of Daegu on March 29, 2007, succeeding Paul Ri Moun-hi. He remained archbishop until his resignation on August 17, 2009, due to health concerns. Young-su died on August 31 at the age of 67.

Catholic Church titles
Preceded by Manuel Felipe Díaz Sánchez	— TITULAR — Titular Bishop of Sitifis; 22 December 2000 – 3 February 2006	Succeeded by Broderick Pabillo
Preceded by Paul Ri Moun-hi	Archbishop of Daegu; 29 March 2009 – 17 August 2009	Succeeded by Thaddeus Cho Hwan-Kil
