= Titus Seo Sang-Bum =

South Korean bishop (born 1961)

Most Reverend Titus Seo Sang-Bum
- Bishop of Military Ordinariate of Korea
- Native name: 서상범 티토
- Church: Catholic Church; Latin Church
- Diocese: Military Ordinariate of Korea
- Appointed: 2 February 2021
- Predecessor: Francis Xavier Yu Soo-il
- Successor: Incumbent

Orders
- Ordination: 12 February 1988
- Consecration: 9 April 2021 by Francis Xavier Yu Soo-il

Personal details
- Born: 6 February 1961 (age 65) Seoul, South Korea
- Education: Catholic University of Korea
- Motto: 주님은 나의 힘, 나의 방패

Titus Seo Sang-Bum (Korean: 서상범 티토; born 6 February 1961) is a South Korean Roman Catholic prelate currently serving as Bishop of Military Ordinariate of South Korea.

== Biography ==
Titus was born on 6 February 1961 in Seoul, South Korea. He studied from The Catholic University of Korea.

Titus was ordained a priest on 12 February 1988.

On 2 February 2021, Pope Francis appointed Titus a bishop of Military Ordinariate of South Korea. He was ordained a bishop by Francis Xavier Yu Soo-il on 9 April 2021.
