= Diocese of Cheongju =

Latin Catholic diocese in South Korea

Coordinates: 36.6333°N 127.4830°E

Diocese of Cheongju Dioecesis Cheongiuensis 청주교구

Location
- Country: South Korea
- Territory: North Chungcheong
- Ecclesiastical province: Daegu
- Metropolitan: Daegu

Statistics
- Area: 5,742 km^{2} (2,217 sq mi)
- Population: Total; Catholics: (as of 2017); 1,427,785; 171,875 (12.0%)
- Parishes: 79

Information
- Denomination: Roman Catholic
- Rite: Roman Rite
- Established: 23 June 1958 (67 years ago)
- Cathedral: Cathedral of the Holy Family in Cheongju

Current leadership
- Pope: Leo XIV
- Bishop: Simon Kim Jong-gang
- Metropolitan Archbishop: Thaddeus Cho Hwan-kil
- Bishops emeritus: Gabriel Chang Bong-hun

Map

Website
- Website of the Diocese

The Diocese of Cheongju (Latin: Dioecesis Cheongiuensis) is a diocese of the Latin Church of the Catholic Church located in Cheongju, South Korea. The diocese is suffragan to the Archdiocese of Daegu. The current bishop is Gabriel Chang Bong-hun, appointed in 1999.

== History ==
On 23 June 1958, Pope Pius XII erected the Apostolic Vicariate of Cheongju. It was elevated to a diocese by Pope John XXIII on 10 March 1962.

== Ordinaries ==
=== Apostolic Vicars of Cheongju ===
- James Vincent Pardy, M.M. (1958–1962)

=== Bishops of Cheongju ===
- James Vincent Pardy, M.M. (1962–1972)
- Nicholas Cheong Jin-suk (1970–1998), appointed Archbishop of Seoul, later Cardinal
- Gabriel Chang Bong-hun (1999–2022)
- Simon Kim Jong-gang (2022–present)

== See also ==
- Catholic Church in South Korea
