= Operation Vulcan =

1943 final battles of Tunisian campaign

- Part of the Tunisian campaign of the Second World War
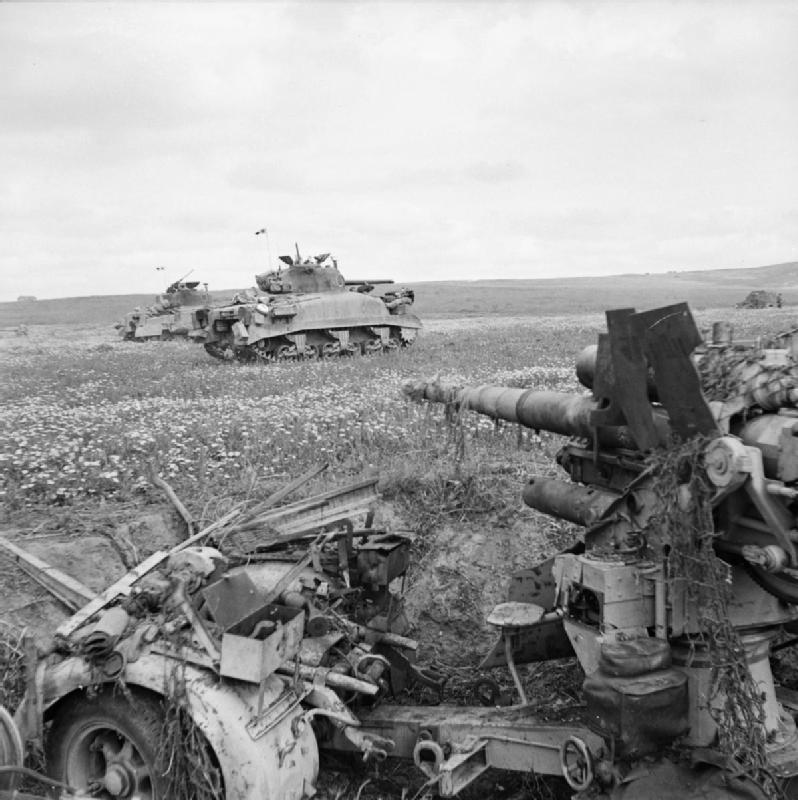
- A 10th Hussars Sherman tank moves past a knocked out 88mm gun on the Goubelet plain on 23 April 1943 during Operation Vulcan
Date	22 April – 1 May 1943
Location	Tunis, Cap Bon, and Bizerte, Tunisia 34°N 09°E
Result	Allied victory

Belligerents
United Kingdom; United States; Free France	Germany; Italy

Commanders and leaders
(United Kingdom) Harold Alexander; Kenneth Anderson; Bernard Montgomery; Arthur Coningham; (United States) Omar Bradley	(Kingdom of Italy) Giovanni Messe; (Nazi Germany) Hans-Jürgen von Arnim; Gustav von Vaerst

Operation Vulcan (22 April – 1 May 1943) was one of the last ground attacks by the Allied forces of the First Army against the Italian and German forces in Tunisia in the last Axis bridgeheads in North Africa, during the Tunisian campaign of the Second World War.

An Axis attack on British positions on 20 April failed to delay Operation Vulcan which commenced two days later. The Allies hoped to breach the Axis defences and break out beyond towards Bizerte and Tunis. The attack by First Army succeeded in capturing important strategic locations such as Longstop Hill, Point 174 and Hill 609. This forced the Axis to withdraw resulting in large areas being abandoned to the Allies. Vulcan did not break out through into the open ground as planned, but it severely weakened the Axis forces, and became the first stage of the final Allied assault in the Tunisian campaign. Operation Strike commenced only a week after Vulcan had terminated, and within a few days allied forces broke through Axis frontlines, putting an end to the North Africa campaign.

== Background ==
=== Allies ===
Allied forces had landed in French North Africa in July 1942 and since November 1942 the British Eighth Army had pushed Axis forces westwards from Egypt and across Libya, leaving only Tunisia under Axis control. The allied First Army (Kenneth Anderson), despite not having captured Tunis by December 1943, had begun to hem in Army Group Africa (Heeresgruppe Afrika/Gruppo d'Armate Africa) by the beginning of the following year. The Eighth Army (General Bernard Montgomery) having won the Western Desert campaign were now aiming to join First Army in Tunisia. They had broken through Axis positions at the Battle of Wadi Akarit by 7 April and combined with the US II Corps (Major General George S. Patton) attack at the Battle of El Guettar, Axis troops fell back to defensible positions north and west of Enfidaville, 25 mi (40 km) south of Cape Bon. The mountains there descend to the sea, with a narrow passage to Hammamet.

Sketch map of Tunisia during the 1942–1943 campaign

By this time 18th Army Group was created, commanded by General Sir Harold Alexander and came under General Dwight D. Eisenhower, Commander-in-Chief Allied Forces Headquarters (AFHQ). Allied aircraft had been moved forward to the recently captured airfields in Eastern Tunisia by Eighth Army to prevent the aerial supply of Axis troops in North Africa. In Operation Flax the Allied air forces successfully cut off Axis supplies, and gained control of the air.

Following their breakthrough at Wadi Akarit, Eighth Army troops pushed along the coastal plain of Eastern Tunisia and took Sfax on 10 April and Sousse two days later. Patrols met advance guards of U. S. II Corps on the Gabes road and linked up the Allied lines. An attack by the British 6th Armoured and the US 34th Infantry divisions took the Fondouk Pass on the same day, followed by Kairouan.

By April 13, the Allied line faced the Axis who were now concentrated in North-eastern Tunisia from Enfidaville on the Southeast facing the Eighth Army, Pont Du Fahs and Medjez El Bab to Sedjenane facing the First Army. Meanwhile with victory in Tunisia only a matter of months if not weeks, Patton passed command of US II Corps to General Omar Bradley as the former began planning for America's contribution to the invasion of Italy.

Anderson was able to turn his full attention to the orders he had received from Alexander to prepare the large-scale attack, scheduled for 22 April, to gain Tunis code named Operation Vulcan.

For Vulcan, Alexander shifted his attack from the narrow bottleneck at the south to the broad western side, where British, American, and French troops could maneuver in unison. Three divisions of the Eighth Army were transferred to the First Army while US II Corps had 100,000 men moved 150 miles north, passing through the British First Army to the Beja road which ran to Bizerte.

=== Axis ===
Despite having won the race to Tunis in December 1942, Axis offensives from January to March (Operation Frühlingswind and Operation Ochsenkopf) attempted to force back the allies. After driving wedges in the allied lines these offensives ultimately failed and only delayed further allied offensives. Eventually allied forces retook all lost ground by early April and Axis forces instead built up defensive positions all along their front.

Generalfeldmarschall Erwin Rommel believed that the Axis position in Tunisia was untenable and he had recommended the evacuation of all German troops to Italy, where he believed they could be more useful. His advice was rejected by Adolf Hitler.

By April 1943 Germans and Italians continued, with all remaining aircraft and ships, to desperately evacuate troops. Casualties particularly from Operation Flax were heavy. For the Axis the situation was confusing - transport missions from Sicily to Tunisia (by ship and air) usually returned loaded with wounded and sometimes unwounded troops. How desperate the situation had become was illustrated by the events of the evening of 18 April: only six transports made it back to Sicily out of 65 that had left Tunis. Flying at sea level, half of them were shot down and the remainder turned back damaged.

== Prelude ==
Von Arnim now prepared for a major allied offensive. He expected the main Allied thrust at Medjerda and the Goubellat plain, he thus deployed his best infantry the 334th Division north of the Medjez-Massicault road and the Hermann Goring Division to its south. To the southern boundary of the Goubellat Plain and Pont-du-Fahs, Von Arnim moved Hans Cramer's Afrika Korps facing British IX Corps and the French XIX Corps respectively.

=== Operation Oration ===
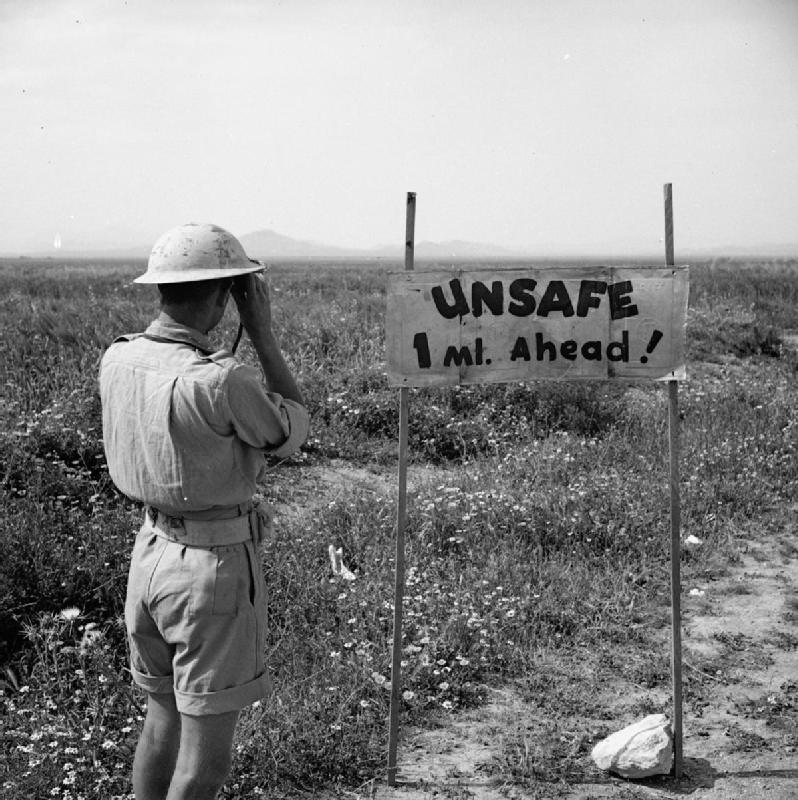
An Eighth Army sergeant scanning the hills for sign of the enemy, on the Enfidaville road

To support Operation Vulcan the Eighth Army aimed to tie down as many Axis troops as possible, while the 1st Army was making their attacks. Called Operation Oration, the British objective was to break through the Enfidaville Line. This meant taking the high ground as well as the tactically important town of Enfidaville. To reinforce the First Army, the 1st Armoured Division was transferred from the Eighth Army on 18 April. Montgomery, unhappy with this move, hoped to breakthrough first and capture Tunis. Facing the Eighth Army was the 1st Army (General Giovanni Messe) a mix of veteran but under strength Italian and German divisions.

On 19 April, X Corps (Brian Horrocks) launched an attack after an artillery bombardment. The 4th Indian Infantry Division (Francis Tuker) and the 2nd New Zealand Division (Bernard Freyburg) advanced into the hills west of Enfidaville to capture Takrouna and Djebel Garci hill respectively. The Italians defending their main defensive line fell back to another defensive line to escape the bombardment. The 50th Northumbrian Division took the town of Enfidaville after severe fighting from the Italian 16th Motorized Division "Pistoia". The New Zealanders meanwhile took the village of Takrouna along with its dominating hill, and the 4th Indian Division took the southern portion of Djebel Garci with many casualties. By the end of the first day it was clear a breakthrough had not been achieved. The northward advance of Eighth Army had "pinched out" US II Corps' eastward facing front line, allowing the corps to be withdrawn and switched to the northern end of the Allied front. This was achieved with great success and speed without the Axis knowing. This move was fully completed by 24 April.

Montgomery allowed the offensive to continue but the next day was dominated by Axis counter-attacks led by Fritz Bayerlein. The 16th "Pistoia" launched several counter attacks towards Enfidaville but were beaten back. Elsewhere Axis attempts to retake the lost ground were repelled with severe losses on both sides. With the advance halted, Montgomery learned that the Axis position in Africa was hopeless through ULTRA intelligence. He ordered Oration to be terminated on 21 April as further casualties in his opinion were not worth it. Montgomery authorised local minor attacks in order to keep the pressure on Axis forces in front of the Eighth Army while Vulcan was in progress.

=== Unternehmen Fliederblüte ===
While the British were preparing for Vulcan, the Germans launched a spoiling attack on the night of 20/21 April 1943. Code named Unternehmen Fliederblüte (Operation Lilac Blossom) they were to strike at V Corps in the hope to retake the heights on the edge of the Goubellet plain, including a pass on the north side of Djebel Djaffa and the nearby 'banana ridge'.

The Germans attacked four points simultaneously in three groups under General Schmid. Elements of the 10th Panzer Division supported by Tiger Tanks and infantry from the 1st Hermann Göring Division surprised the British and broke through the positions on the ridge on a twelve mile sector to depth of about five miles. The attack surprised the British at first causing confusion. The Germans however fell headlong into the main British positions ready for Vulcan including field artillery. In the ensuing bombardment, with the British firing sometimes over open sights, the Germans suffered severe losses in men and tanks. British troops supported by Churchill tanks counter-attacked and pushed the Germans back.

Despite the loss of four Churchills knocked out, after determined fighting the British retook Banana Ridge and the Germans retreated by the afternoon of 21 April. The Hermann Göring division alone lost some 327 casualties and two valuable Tigers knocked out. The attack failed to deter the British offensive in this sector and only put the Axis position to further strain. It was also the last major German armoured attack in North Africa.

== Operation Vulcan ==
=== British V Corps ===
The British V Corps began with a preliminary attack on 21 April, aimed at retaking the heights of Djebel el Ahmera, Sidi Ahmed ridge and Djebel Rhar, known collectively as Longstop Hill. The hill had been lost to the Germans four months earlier. The hill was defended by the reinforced 999th Light Afrika Division which was composed of the 962nd Afrika-Schützen-Regiment and the III/754th Grenadier Regiment. Infantry of the 78th (Battleaxe) Division and Churchill Mk III tanks of the North Irish Horse assaulted the position.

Djebel Ahmera was seized on 24 April by the Argyll and Sutherland Highlanders and the East Surrey Regiment after severe fighting. Later that day an attempt was made by East Surreys and a squadron of tanks, to clear Sidi Ahmed ridge just north of Longstop Hill and that too was captured and held.

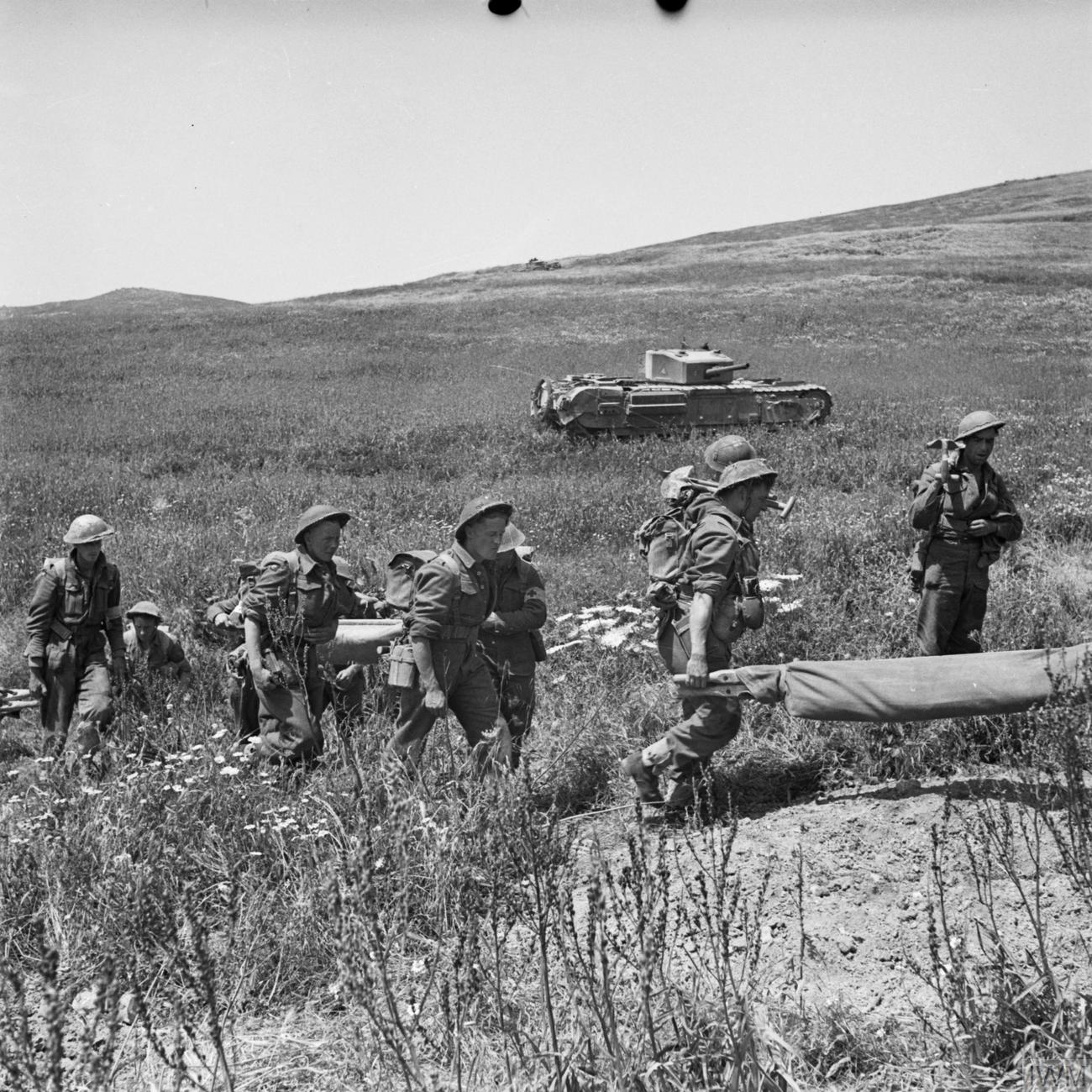
Stretcher bearers of the East Surrey Regiment, with a Churchill tank of the North Irish Horse in the background, during the attack on Longstop Hill (Djebel Rhar), 23 April 1943.

The main hill, Djebel Rhar was attacked on 26 April, when the Buffs (Royal East Kent Regiment) along with Churchill tanks stormed up the hill. With gradients of 1:3 the Churchills managed to creep over the crest of the hill and breached the German defences, much to the surprise of the defenders. The Buffs and Argylls then cleared the German positions - some 650 prisoners were taken during the battle. Longstop was the last great natural barrier barring movement towards Tunis.

Once Longstop had been taken the 24th Guards Brigade launched an attack against Djebels Assoud and Bou Aoukaz on 27 April - two dominating positions approaching Tebourba. Advancing some 2,000 yards through the Gab Gab Gap the Irish Guards took Djebel Assoud while the Grenadier Guards took Djebel Bou Aoukaz despite heavy casualties. The Germans counter attacked and managed to regain the left flank of Djebel Bou Aoukaz. The Scots Guards attempted to regain the positions, but eventually the hill became isolated by 29 April due to heavy bombardments and exposure to machine gun and mortar fire. In this time, Von Arnim, desperate to plug gaps had formed all remaining armoured units into one force - Kampfgruppe Irkens, commanded by Oberst Josef Irkens. By May 1 the Irish Guards were finally relieved on Djebel Assoud with only 80 survivors. Up to 700 German dead were counted in front of them. In this action the 24th Guards Brigade won two Victoria Crosses.

The right flank of V Corps attack was made by the 1st Infantry Division and the 4th Infantry Division in the Medjerda valley and Medjez el Bab. 1st Division's objective was Point 174 (Gueriat el Atach), a ridge near Crich-El-Oued and Medjez El Bab.

On 22 April, the attack began with 45 tanks of the 142nd Regiment Royal Armoured Corps and the 2nd Infantry Brigade backed by massed artillery. The 2nd North Staffords, seized the nearby Points 151 and 156, holding both against German counter attacks. The Loyal Regiment then led the assault on Point 174 that was captured in a costly success; while digging in they were ejected by a German counter-attack.

The next day, the 3rd Infantry Brigade with support of Churchill tanks from 48th Royal Tank Regiment and 147 Regiment Royal Armoured Corps launched a new attack. The 2nd Battalion Sherwood Foresters without tank support, (who were late arriving), had managed to capture a position near Point 174 and in an assault finally seized the whole objective. With Point 174 in British hands once more the Germans again counter-attacked the following day with tanks including Tigers from the 504th Heavy Panzer Battalion (schwere Panzer-Abteilung 504). The leading platoon was almost overrun with only PIAT and mortar fire to defend against the Tigers. Churchill tanks and anti-tank guns were brought up on time and the counterattack was repelled with the Germans in retreat. A number of German tanks were taken out, including a Tiger tank (Tiger 131) which was captured intact with only light damage. The crew had abandoned the tank failing to destroy it, and this would prove valuable.

By the end of April, it had taken V Corps eight days to penetrate 9.7 km (6 mi) and capture most of the Axis defensive positions. The battle had drawn the Axis reserves of armour south, away from the central front.

=== British IX and French XIX Corps ===
On the morning of 22 April, the 46th Division attacked on the IX Corps front, aiming for the hills northeast of Bou Arada held by elements of elite Division Hermann Göring. It was hoped that a gap would be created for the 6th Armoured Division to pass through by nightfall, followed by 1st Armoured Division into the Goubellat plain. After a heavy artillery bombardment the 46th struck and in heavy fighting took its objectives, but took two days to fully clear and thus was not quick enough to forestall the creation of a strong anti-tank screen.

The 6th Armoured Division managed to pierce the German defences but were unable to break out quick enough. The 17/21st Lancers took a key position known as 'Two Tree Hill' taking out the anti-tank defences on 23 April. The following day as the tanks moved further on, deep Wadis and broken ground held up the advance, and fierce tank on tank engagements took place over the next two days around Djebel es Srassif. 6th Armoured nevertheless overcame the German armour having lost three Shermans while they had knocked out some fourteen tanks (one Tiger and thirteen MKIII & MKIVs).

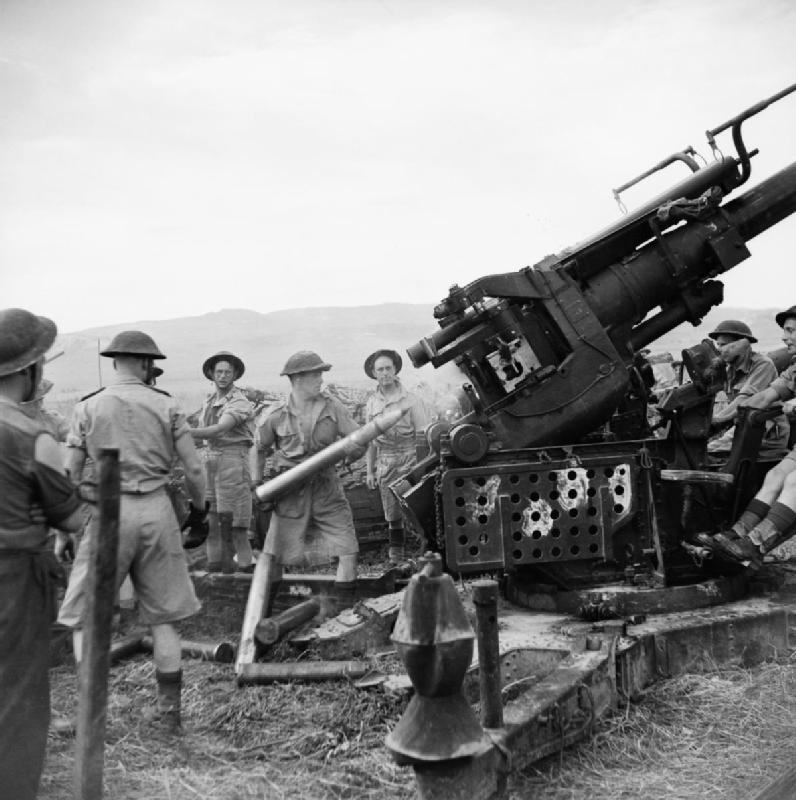
A 3.7-inch anti-aircraft gun in use in the field artillery role by 264 Battery, 58th Heavy Anti-Aircraft Regiment, Royal Artillery in the Medjez-el-Bab sector, 27 April 1943

By 24 April, 6th Armoured Division had advanced to the next line of hills and into the gap by the lake of Sebkhet el Kourzia. This however was as far as they got as Axis reinforcements began to tell bringing the British armour to a halt. Crocker by this stage had realised that it was too late for a break out attempt. The next day 1st Armoured was switched to 6th Armoured's positions, but the former could make little headway against Djebel Kournine, a well defended hill position. By the middle of Operation Vulcan, the British and French were holding onto their objectives despite counter attacks. Both sides suffered heavy losses, but these were more crippling to the Axis, who could not afford them - 10th Panzer Division had less than 25 operational tanks left and there were none left for resupply.

Von Arnim, realising 6th Armoured's deep advance, ordered reinforcements immediately from 1st Italian Army and the 10th Panzer Division as the southern wing of the Hermann Göring division began to buckle. French XIX Corps meanwhile attacked through the Kebir River valley and had penetrated to within sight of Djebel-el-Zaghouan and indented the flanks at Pont-du-Fahs. Further advances however were checked with heavy losses and so the French advance came to a halt. The attacks by the British and French meant that the Germans were forced to withdraw to shorten their defence line.

On 24 April, the 4th Infantry Division went to attack three features around Peter's Corner, Sidi Abdullah, Cactus Farm and 'Point 133'. Once captured, it was then hoped that 10th and 21st Tank Brigades would storm through beyond the sheltered village of Ksar Tyr. The fighting was costly against German units in well-prepared and dug-in defences. They were opposed by German Fallschirmjager (paratroops) of the elite Division Hermann Göring. At Cactus Farm, the British infantry was faced by extensive defensive fire from well-concealed German paratroopers. Churchill tanks of the 12th Royal Tank Regiment (21st Tank Brigade) advanced without infantry support and the tanks were attacked with Molotov cocktails and sticky Teller anti-tank mines. Twelve tanks were destroyed and in some cases, their crews were rescued by the Germans. On 30 April another attack went in again, but the Germans had already evacuated the farm having to shorten their defence line, due to attacks elsewhere.

Seeing that no further progress was likely, Anderson withdrew the 6th Armoured Division and most of the 46th Infantry Division into army reserve.

=== II US Corps ===
II US Corps commanded by Major General Omar Bradley attacked on two areas in the North and the South. The Northern attack began on 23 April with the Corps francs d'Afrique, a mixed force of French escapees from Vichy France, Moroccan Tabors, Berber tribesmen, Spanish Loyalists and other political refugees in support. They had been trained and equipped by the British earlier in the year. Avoiding the valleys the Americans took the more strenuous task of attacking along the ridges sometimes with mule trains. Despite heavy casualties the objectives were taken by 25 April and held against counter attacks.

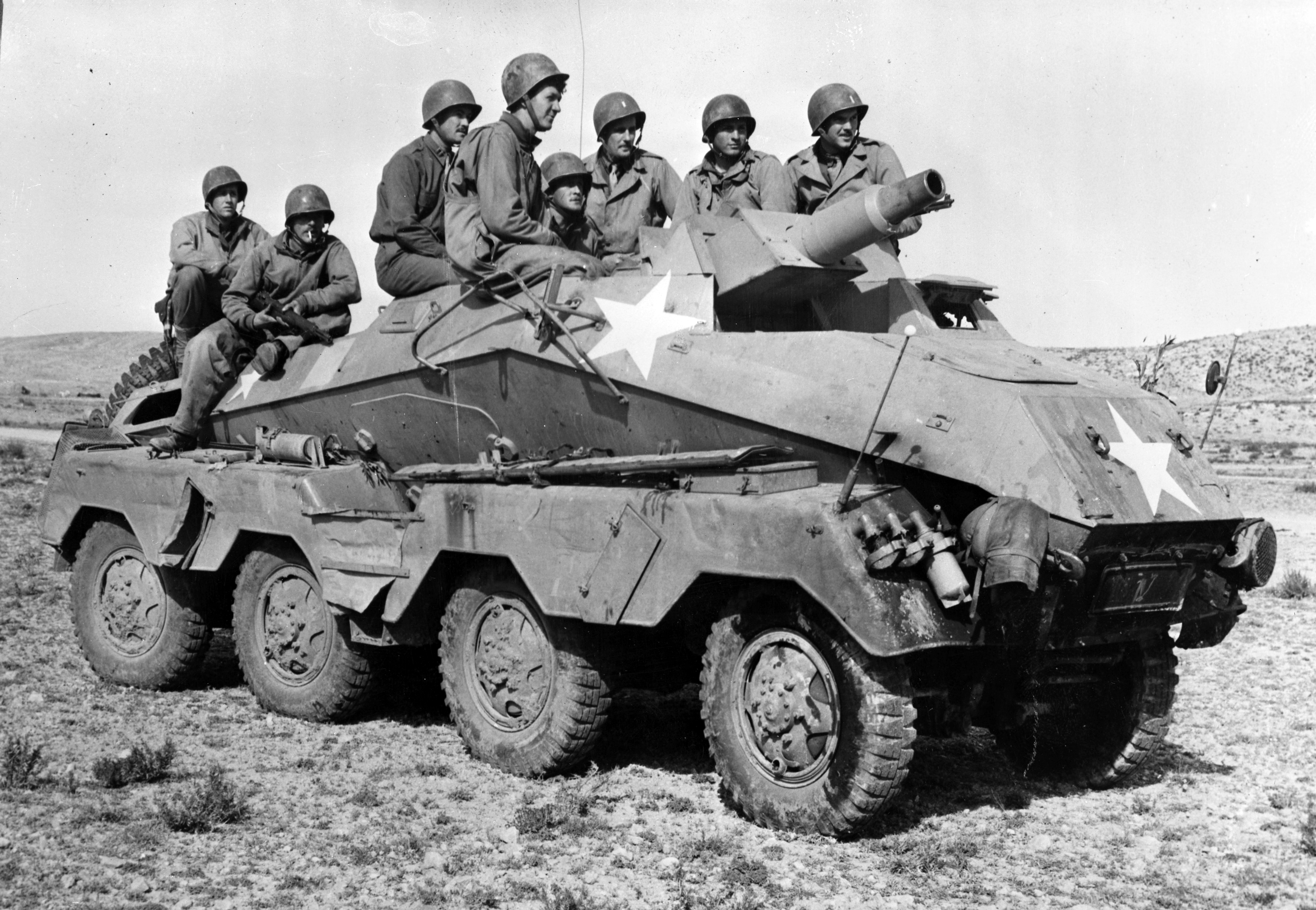
Captured German SdKfz 233 armoured car in Tunisia, 21 April 1943 manned by US troops

The 9th Infantry division next to them moved towards Jefna with Djebel Anchouna and the Hills beyond - 432 ('Bald') and 438 ('Green') as their objectives. By 30 April after heaving fighting Djebel Anchouna's crests were taken, and after a heavy artillery bombardment the Germans abandoned Jefna. The Americans then captured 'Green' and 'Bald' Hills which opened up the Jefna-Mataur road and leaving Axis forces hanging on the edge of the Mateur plain.

Meanwhile the Southern attack was directed against Hill 609 (Djebel Tahent) which was the last commanding height on the German defensive line in front of them. It was thus heavily defended and was one of the most difficult objectives in Tunisia due to its steep slopes. The hill was flanked by two others Hill 490 and Hill 531.

On 26 April the attack commenced - 34th Infantry Division was ordered to take the hill backed by II US Corps artillery. After bitter resistance from the German defenders which included a German paratroop unit (Barenthin), the attack stalled over the next two days with severe casualties. Hearing of the failure thus far Anderson requested that hill should be bypassed, but Bradley angrily turned this down. The attack went in again and Hill 490 was won on 28 April, but attempts on Hill 531 and 609 again stalled. German flanking fire made the assault costly. Further attempts resulted in heavy losses and by 29 April, US units had gained Hill 531 but attacks on Hill 609 had again been repelled. By this point US losses were 183 killed, 1,594 wounded and some 676 captured or missing.

On 30 April Bradley desperately wanted the hill seized and this time sent in Sherman tanks. With heavy artillery support, the Americans despite losing a number of tanks reached the hill and drove off the Germans. The expected German counter-attack came in the next day, but the Americans, having dug in on the plateau, held on to their positions.

=== Final attacks ===
On 29 April, a final attempt was made on the Eighth Army front to capture Djebels Srafi and Terhouna in the hope to break out to the Cape Bon peninsula. The responsibility for keeping the left flank of Montgomery was to fall on the 2nd New Zealand Division and the 201st Guards Brigade, while the main coastal assault was to be led by the 4th Indian Division. The attack went in - capturing Djebel Terhouna, a strategic high ground five miles north of Enfidaville. The hill was held and Axis counterattacks were repelled the following day. This was followed by an attack by the 169th Infantry Brigade of 56th (London) Infantry Division. The division was inexperienced, and had only been on the front for 48 hours having just arrived after a 3,300 mi (5,300 km) journey from Syria. They were to attack Djebel Srafi a hill that lay just before the area of Hammamet which were held by the German 90th Light Infantry Division. The attack went in and succeeded in taking the position, but a German counterattack combined with British artillery attempting to fend of the attack caused panic forcing the brigade to retreat having suffered less than 250 casualties. The result of this convinced Montgomery and Alexander that an Eighth Army attack north from Enfidaville, into strongly-held and difficult terrain, would not succeed.

By 1 May, the seizure of Hill 609 forced the Germans to retreat to a defensive line near the Garaet Achkel salt lake only 20 km (12 mi) from Bizerte. Kef en Nsour was taken on 2 May which overlooked the Mateur plain. Mateur itself was taken and US forces came within thirteen miles of Bizerte, north of Achkel, as the Axis forces moved south on Tunis attempting to find refuge at Cape Bon.

== Aftermath ==
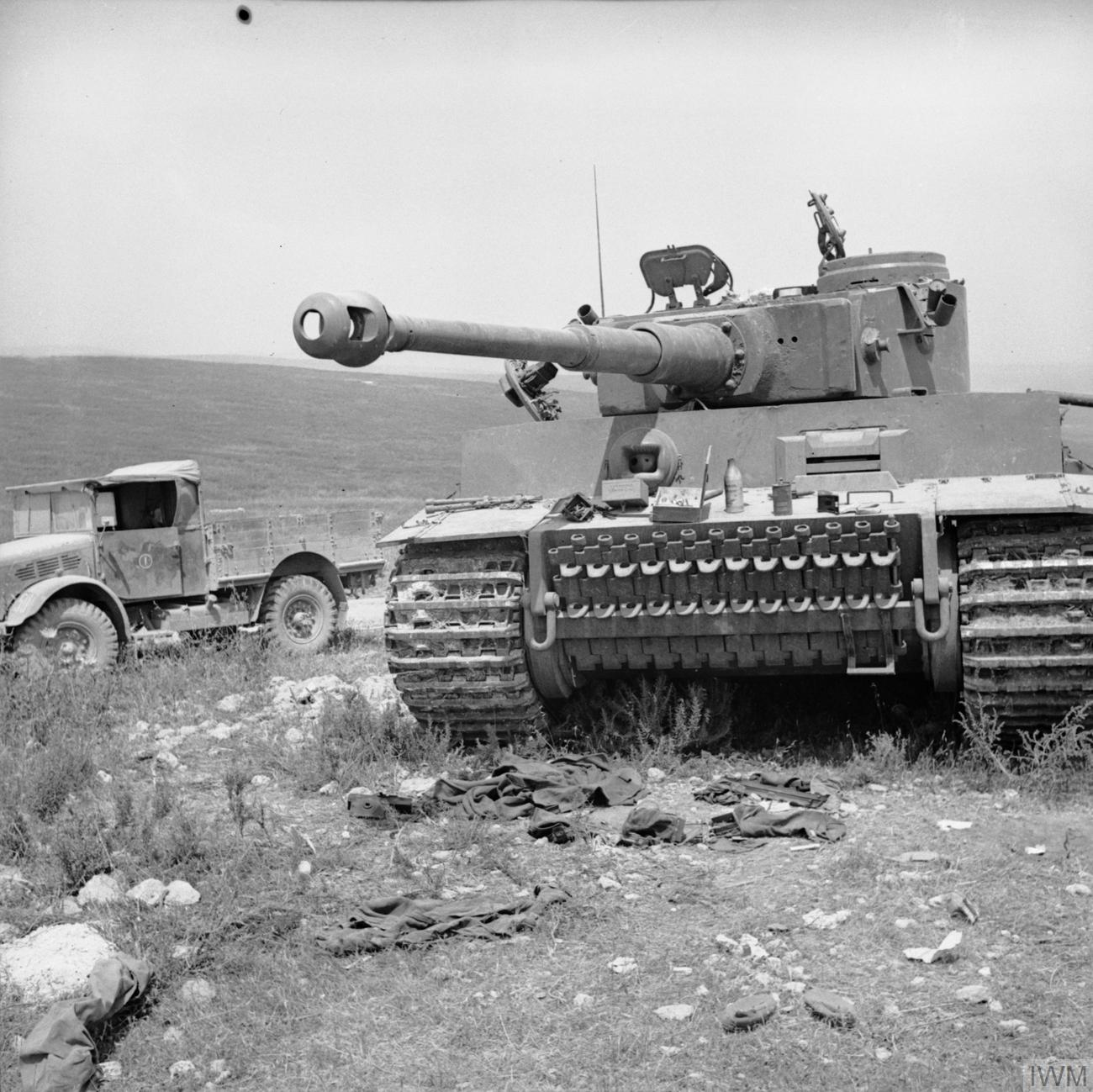
Captured Tiger tank (Tiger 131) after the battle for Point 174 (Gueriat el Atach)

The First Army had dented the Axis line but had not broken through and had lost some 252 tanks, a considerable portion of its armour. Nevertheless, Vulcan had taken tactically important positions and had severely weakened the Axis forces. By 1 May, the Germans were down to 69 operational tanks (including four Tigers) in the Tunisian theatre. The counter-attacks had used most of the remaining fuel reserves, further restricting tactical mobility. Operation Vulcan, along with Operation Flax, played an important part in weakening the Axis situation in Tunisia.

The allies were made aware of the Axis' predicament when Ultra decrypts on 30 April revealed that they were at breaking point. Fuel reserves were critically low - the Luftwaffe couldn't find even find 35 gallons to operate its radar sets. Warnings were issued by German naval command through wireless intercepts that a 'complete supply breakdown was imminent in the next few days'.

For the US the capture of Hill 609 was a big relief for Bradley. More importantly it was a much needed American victory providing a springboard for further successes. The British were also impressed with the Americans noting that they had performed better than they had expected. There was also a positive attitude towards the Americans in that they had learned to adapt to Axis, as well as British tactics and having learned quickly from the debacle of the Battle of Kasserine Pass only two months before.

After some changes and movements Operation Strike was planned over the next week after Vulcan's termination. Djebel Bou Aoukaz which had defied V Corps was attacked and captured on 5 May - a prelude as to what was to follow. The following day First Army attacked all along the front with IX Corps leading the assault. After some slow progress in some areas by May 7 the allies had broken through with ease against the depleted Axis forces. Tunis and Bizerte were captured by the British and Americans respectively within a day, and soon Axis forces began to surrender en masse.

By May 13 after scattered resistance Axis forces had fully surrendered. Overall some 240,000 were taken prisoner including their commanders Von Arnim and Marshal Messe, ending the Tunisian, as well as the North African campaign.

=== Legacy ===
Tiger 131 which had been captured on 24 April was repaired with parts from other destroyed Tigers. It was displayed in Tunis following the end of the Tunisian campaign and formally inspected there by King George VI and Winston Churchill. The tank was sent to England in October 1943 where it was displayed as a trophy and was subjected to extensive testing and evaluation by the School of Tank Technology at Chobham.

Tiger 131 is now preserved at The Tank Museum in Bovington in Dorset, England, and is currently the only operational Tiger I in the world.
