= Germaniciana =

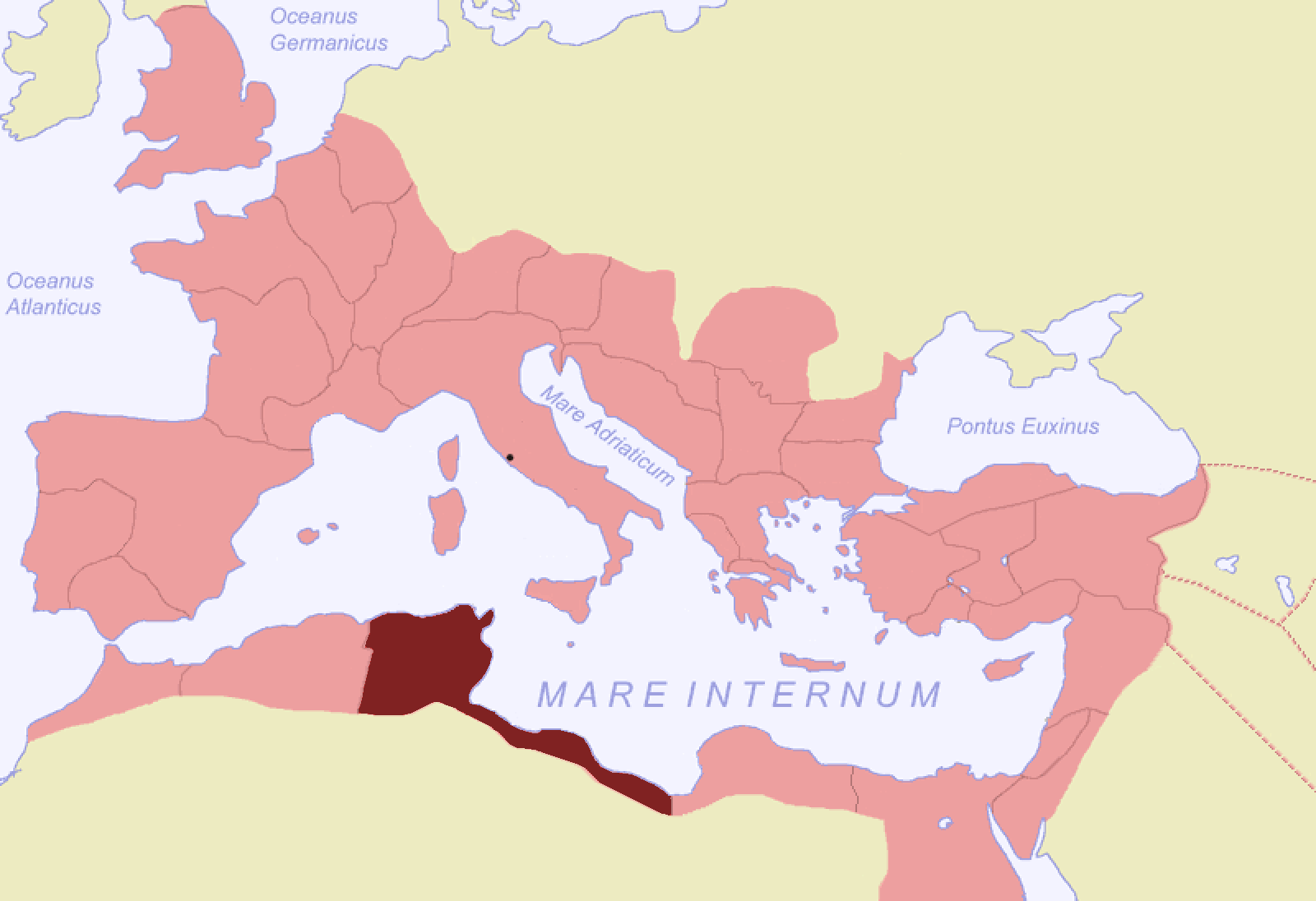
Africa proconsularis.

Abbir Germaniciana also known as Abir Cella is the name of a Roman and Byzantine-era city in the Roman province of Africa proconsularis in North Africa. The city was also the seat of a Christian bishopric in the ecclesiastical province of Carthage. It is best known for Cyprian of Carthage, its bishop around 250 CE.

Abbir Germaniciana no longer exists as a community and its location remains in dispute.

== Location ==
The site of Abbir Germaniciana is in the coastal region of North Africa, known as the Magreb. However, its exact location has never been verified. There are several theories:

- The historian Adolf Harnack in the early 20th century suggested that Abbir Germaniciana was near the town of Membressa in the Medjerda River Valley in present-day Tunisia.
- The writer André Mandouze and academic Sylvain Destephen in 1982 theorized that the village of Henchir el Naam, near Sebkhet el Kourzia Lake in Tunisia, was the location of Abbir Maius, another lost Roman city. That would place Abbir Germaniciana on the Meliane Wadi in Tunisia
- The Ravenna Cosmology, an 8th-century geographic work, lists Abbir Germaniciana as "the Germana". The Antonine Itinerary, a listing of Roman roads created in the 8th century, lists the city as "Ad Germani". Both sources place it near the former Roman colony of Theveste in present-day Algeria.
- Other sources suggest that the Roman ruins of Ksour-el-Maïete in Tunisia are actually Abbir Germaniciana.

== Bishopric ==
Abbir Germaniciana was the seat of a Christian bishopric for at least 200 years. During the Roman Empire, the city appears to have been Christian before Rome started persecuting Christians during the Diocletian Persecution of 303 to 311 CE. It became part of the Vandal Kingdom in 429 CE. After Arab armies took Tunisia from the Byzantine Empire in the late 7th century, the bishopric of Abbir Germaniciana disappeared as its population converted to Islam.

=== Known bishops ===
The following men were bishops in Abbir Germaniciani between 205 and 484 CE

- St. Cyprian of Carthage fl 250.
- Successus, fl 258.
- Annibonius fl. 411
- Candidus fl. 416 to 419
- Felix fl 436 to 484

=== Titular bishops ===
In 1933, the Vatican re-established Abbir Germaniciana as a titular see for the Catholic Church. A titular see is a bishopric that no longer functions as one.

- Paul Bouque, bishop of the Diocese of Nkongsamba in Cameroon (1964 to 1976)
- Aloísio Sinésio Bohn, auxiliary bishop of the Archdiocese of Brasília in Brazil (1977 to 1980)
- Hermann Josef Spital, bishop of the Diocese of Münster in what was then West Germany (1980 to 1981)
- Leo Schwarz, bishop of the Diocese of Trier in Germany (1982 to 2018)
- Gerhard Schneider, auxiliary bishop of the Diocese of Rottenburg-Stuttgart, Germany (2019 to present
