= Diocese of Masan =

Roman Catholic diocese in South Korea

Coordinates: 35.2000°N 128.5670°E

Diocese of Masan Dioecesis Masanensis 마산교구

Location
- Country: South Korea
- Territory: Western part of South Gyeongsang
- Ecclesiastical province: Daegu
- Metropolitan: Archdiocese of Daegu

Statistics
- Area: 9,054 km^{2} (3,496 sq mi)
- Population: Total; Catholics: (as of 2017); 2,466,654; 182,194 (7.2%)
- Parishes: 73

Information
- Denomination: Catholic Church
- Sui iuris church: Latin Church
- Rite: Roman Rite
- Established: February 15, 1966 (59 years ago)
- Cathedral: Cathedral of the Sacred Heart in Masan

Current leadership
- Pope: Leo XIV
- Bishop: Linus Lee Seong-hyo
- Metropolitan Archbishop: Thaddeus Cho Hwan-gil
- Bishops emeritus: Francis Xavier Ahn Myong-ok; Constantine Bae Ki-hyen

Map

Website
- Website of the Diocese

The Diocese of Masan (Latin: Dioecesis Masanensis) is a Latin Church ecclesiastical territory or diocese of the Catholic Church in South Korea. It is a suffragan diocese in the ecclesiastical province of the Archdiocese of Daegu. The current bishop is Constantine Bae Ki Hyen, appointed in 2016.

== History ==
On February 15, 1966 Pope Paul VI established the Diocese of Masan with territory taken from the Diocese of Busan.

== Leadership ==
=== Ordinaries ===
- Servant of God Stephen Kim Sou-hwan (1966–1968), appointed Archbishop of Seoul
- Joseph Byeong Hwa Chang (1968–1988)
- Michael Pak Jeong-il (1988–2002)
- Francis Xavier Ahn Myong-ok (2002–2016)
- Constantine Bae Ki-hyen (2016–2022)
- The Rev. Paul Shin Eun-geun (2022-2024; apostolic administrator)
- Linus Lee Seong-hyo (2024–present)

=== Coadjutor Bishops ===
- Francis Xavier Ahn Myong-ok (2000–2002)

== See also ==
- Roman Catholicism in South Korea
- Bishop of Masan
