= Bishop of Busan =

Bishop of Busan may refer to:

- The bishop of the Catholic Diocese of Busan, South Korea
- The bishop of the Anglican Diocese of Busan, South Korea

Note: despite the differences of spelling above, Busan and Pusan are different variants of spelling of the same city in South Korea.
