= René Marie Albert Dupont =

French Roman Catholic prelate (1929–2025)

His Excellency René Marie Albert Dupont
- Bishop Emeritus of Andong
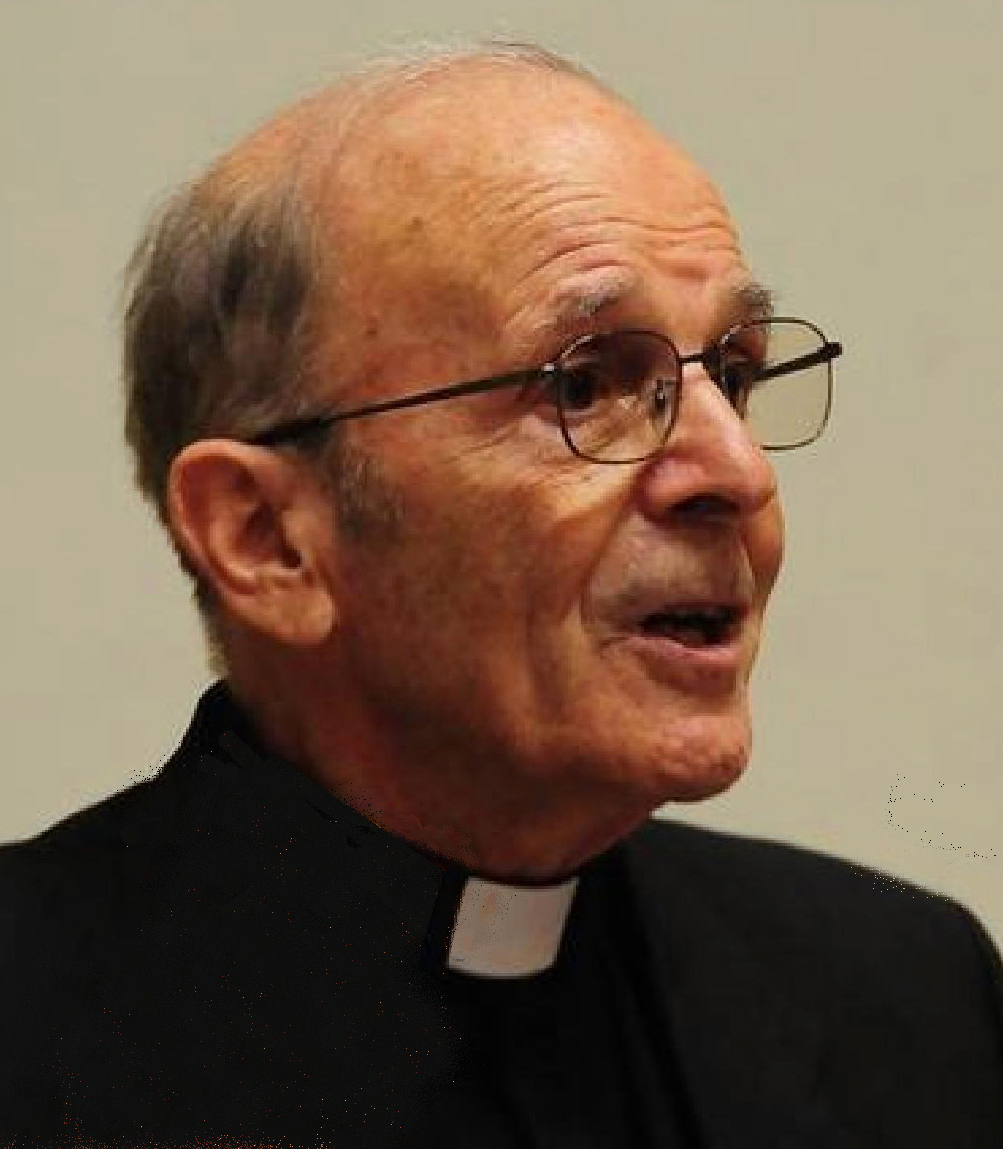
- Dupont in 2014
- Archdiocese: Daegu
- Diocese: Andong
- Appointed: 29 May 1969
- Term ended: 6 October 1990
- Predecessor: First
- Successor: Ignatius Pak Sok-hi

Orders
- Ordination: 29 June 1953
- Consecration: 25 July 1969 by Stephen Kim Sou-hwan

Personal details
- Born: 2 September 1929 Saint-Jean-le-Blanc, Loiret, France
- Died: 10 April 2025 (aged 95) Andong, South Korea

René Marie Albert Dupont (2 September 1929 – 10 April 2025) was bishop emeritus of the Roman Catholic Diocese of Andong.

== Biography ==
Dupont was born on 2 September 1929, in Saint-Jean-le-Blanc, Loiret, France, near Orleans.

He was ordained a priest of the Society for Foreign Missions of Paris on 29 June 1953. He arrived in the Republic of Korea in 1954. According to the Yonhap Korean news agency, he "devoted his life to pastoral work in rural South Korea," as a priest and bishop, and "was dispatched to South Korea shortly after the 1950–53 Korean War and dedicated more than 70 years to serving rural communities through his pastoral mission".

Dupont was appointed bishop of Andong on 29 May 1969. He received episcopal ordination the following 25 July. His Principal Consecrator was Stephen Cardinal Kim Sou-hwan, Archbishop of Seoul, with Co-Consecrators Bishop Victorinus Youn Kong-hi, Bishop of Suwon, and Archbishop John Baptist Sye Bong-Kil, the Archbishop of Daegu (Taegu).

On 6 October 1990, he retired as diocesan bishop. Dupont continued to serve the rural area of South Korea until poor health required him to go to hospital, a total of 70 years. In 2019, he was granted an honorary Korean nationality "in recognition of his efforts in rural education and community development for more than 60 years". In 2022, he was the subject of a documentary film and moved into a retirement home.

Dupont died of a cerebral infarction in Andong, on 10 April 2025, at the age of 95.

== See also ==
- Christianity in South Korea

Catholic Church titles
New title	Bishop of Andong; 1969–1990	Succeeded by Ignatius Pak Sok-hi
