= Kim Ji-seok =

Kim Ji-seok may refer to:

- James Kim Ji-seok (born 1940), South Korean Roman Catholic priest, Bishop of the Diocese of Wonju
- Kim Jiseok (festival programmer) (1959–2017), South Korean co-founder, deputy director and head programmer of Busan International Film Festival
- Kim Ji-seok (actor) (born 1981), South Korean actor
- Kim Ji-seok (Go player) (born 1989), South Korean Go player
