= Bishop of Masan =

This page lists the bishops of Masan.

The Roman Catholic Diocese of Masan was created in 1966 by Pope Paul VI. It is suffragan to Archdiocese of Taegu.

== Bishops of Masan ==
- Stephen Kim Sou-hwan (1966–1968)
- Joseph Byung-hwa Jang (1968–1988)
- Michael Jung-il Park (1988–2002)
- Francis Xavier Myung-ok Ahn (2002–2016)
- Constantine Bae Ki-hyen (2016–2022)

Father Paul Shin Eun-geun, apostolic administrator (2022–present)
