= Francis Xavier Yu Soo-il =

Catholic bishop (1945–2025)

His Excellency Francis Xavier Yu Soo-il
- Bishop of Military Ordinariate of Korea
- Appointed: 16 July 2010
- Term ended: 2 February 2021
- Predecessor: Peter Lee Ki-heon
- Successor: Titus Seo Sang-Bum

Orders
- Ordination: 25 February 1980
- Consecration: 15 September 2010 by Peter Lee Ki-heon

Personal details
- Born: 23 March 1945 Nonsan, Korea, Empire of Japan
- Died: 28 May 2025 (aged 80) Seoul, South Korean
- Motto: Sine intermissione orate
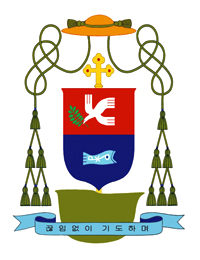
- Coat of arms

Styles of Francis Xavier Yu Soo-il
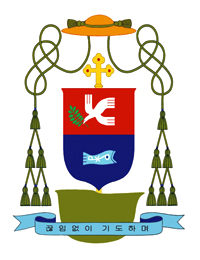
- Reference style: His Excellency; The Most Reverend
- Spoken style: Your Excellency
- Religious style: Bishop

Francis Xavier Yu Soo-il, O.F.M. Obs. (Korean: 유수일 프란치스코 하비에르; Hanja: 劉修一; 23 March 1945 – 28 May 2025) was a South Koreans prelate of the Roman Catholic Church. He served as head of the Military Ordinariate of Korea from 2010 to 2021.

Catholic Church titles
| Preceded by Peter Lee Ki-heon | Military Ordinariate of Korea; 2010–2021 | Succeeded by Titus Seo Sang-bum |
