= Diocese of Korea =

Diocese of Korea may refer to one of the following:

- Diocese of Korea (Catholic)
  - List of Catholic dioceses in Korea
- Diocese of Korea (Anglican Church)
- Diocese of Korea (Russian Orthodox Church)
