= Michael Pak Jeong-il =

South Korean bishop (1926–2024)

His Excellency Michael Pak Jeong-il
- Bishop Emeritus of Masan
- Native name: 충성 온유
- Archdiocese: Daegu
- Diocese: Masan
- Appointed: 15 December 1988
- Term ended: 11 November 2002
- Predecessor: Joseph Byeong Hwa Chang
- Successor: Francis Xavier Ahn Myong-ok
- Previous posts: Bishop of Jeju (1977–1982); Bishop of Jeonju (1982–1988)

Orders
- Ordination: 23 November 1958
- Consecration: 31 May 1977 by Luigi Dossena

Personal details
- Born: 18 December 1926 Pyongyang, Heian'nan-dō, Korea, Empire of Japan
- Died: 28 August 2024 (aged 97)
- Motto: In fide et lenitate

Michael Pak Jeong-il (18 December 1926 – 28 August 2024) was a South Korean Roman Catholic prelate. He was bishop of Jeju from 1977 to 1982, Jeonju from 1982 to 1988, and Masan from 1988 to 2002. Pak Jeong-il died on 28 August 2024, at the age of 97.

Catholic Church titles
Preceded by Joseph Byeong Hwa Chang	Bishop of Masan; 1988–2002	Succeeded by Francis Xavier Ahn Myong-ok
Preceded by Augustine Kim Jae Deok	Bishop of Jeonju; 1982–1988	Succeeded by Vincent Ri Pyung-ho
New title	Bishop of Jeju; 1977–1982	Succeeded by Paul Kim Tchang-ryeol
