= Diocese of Wonju =

Latin Catholic diocese in South Korea

Coordinates: 37.3333°N 127.9170°E

Diocese of Wonju Dioecesis Voniuensis 원주교구

Location
- Country: South Korea
- Territory: Southern part of Gangwon
- Ecclesiastical province: Seoul
- Metropolitan: Seoul

Statistics
- Area: 8,186 km^{2} (3,161 sq mi)
- Population: Total; Catholics: (as of 2017); 862,305; 79,402 (9.0%)
- Parishes: 53

Information
- Denomination: Catholic
- Sui iuris church: Latin Church
- Rite: Roman Rite
- Established: 22 March 1965 (60 years ago)
- Cathedral: Cathedral of Our Lady of Grace in Wonju

Current leadership
- Pope: Leo XIV
- Bishop: Basil Cho Kyu-man
- Metropolitan Archbishop: Andrew Yeom Soo-jung

Map

Website
- wjcatholic.or.kr

The Diocese of Wonju (Latin: Dioecesis Voniuensis) is a diocese of the Latin Church of the Catholic Church in located in Wonju, South Korea. It is a suffragan to the Archdiocese of Seoul.

== History ==
On 22 March 1965, Pope Paul VI established the Diocese of Wonju. Churches in Hoengseong, Pyeongchang, Jecheon and Danyang was transferred to Diocese of Wonju on 1 May 1969. The diocese lost territory later that year when the Diocese of Andong was established on 29 May 1969. The diocese acquired a 40 percent share of Wonju Munwha Broadcasting Corporation in 1970.

== Leadership ==
=== Ordinaries ===
- Daniel Tji Hak-soun (1965–1993)
- James Kim Ji-seok (1993–2016)
- Basil Cho Kyu-man (2016–present)

=== Coadjutor Bishops ===
- James Kim Ji-seok (1990–1993)
