= Benedictus Son Hee-song =

South Korean Catholic bishop

The Most Reverend Benedictus Son Hee-song
- Bishop of Uijeongbu
- Native name: 손희송 베네딕토 孫凞松
- Church: Catholic Church
- Archdiocese: Seoul
- Appointed: 13 March 2024
- Predecessor: Peter Lee Ki-heon
- Successor: "Incumbent"
- Previous posts: Titular Bishop of Campli and Auxiliary Bishop of Seoul

Orders
- Ordination: 4 July 1986
- Consecration: 28 August 2015 by Andrew Yeom Soo-jung

Personal details
- Born: 손희송; Son Hee-Song; 28 January 1957 (age 69) Yeoncheon County, Gyeonggi, South Korea
- Education: University of Innsbruck (STL, STD); Catholic University of Korea (DD)
- Motto: 저의 주님, 저의 하느님; My Lord, My God

Benedictus Son Hee-song (Korean: 손희송 베네딕토; Hanja: 孫凞松; born 28 January 1957) is a South Korean prelate of the Catholic Church. Since March 2024, he is serving as a Bishop of Uijeongbu.

== Early life ==
Son was born on 28 January 1957 in Yeoncheon County, Gyeonggi Province, South Korea. In March 1972, he commenced his secondary education at Songsin High School, a minor seminary in Seoul, the capital and largest city in South Korea. After graduating in April 1975, he entered the major seminary at the Catholic University of Korea, graduating in April 1979. Beginning in October 1982, he attended the University of Innsbruck in Innsbruck, Austria, graduating in April 1986 with a Licentiate of Sacred Theology in dogmatic theology. After ordination back in South Korea, he returned to the University of Innsbruck, graduating in 1992 with a Doctor of Sacred Theology. After returned to South Korea and serving as pastor at a parish for two years, he returned to study at the Catholic University of Korea in March 1993, earning a Doctor of Divinity in dogmatic theology, graduating in February 1996.

== Priesthood ==
Son was ordained a priest on 4 July 1986, several months after returning from his studies in the University of Innsbruck in Austria. After returning to Austria from 1986 to 1992 to continue his studies, he returned to South Korea in October 1992, and began serving as pastor at the parish in the Yongsan district of Seoul. He was pastor there until September 1994, and from 1993 to 1996 he was concurrently pursuing his doctorate at the Catholic University of Seoul. In September 1994, he became a professor of theology at the major seminary at the Catholic University of Seoul, teaching and running the seminary library until his appointment as bishop in 2015.

In addition to teaching, Son held a variety of other offices and positions within the Archdiocese of Seoul. From 2004 to November 2015, he was a member of the Committee for the Doctrine of the Faith of the Catholic Bishops' Conference of South Korea, serving as secretary of the committee from December 2005 to February 2014. He also served on the Episcopal Commission for the Causes of Beatification and Canonization. From August 2012 to August 2015, he was pastoral director of the Archdiocese of Seoul, and from September 2012 to August 2015 he served as a secretary of the bishops' conference's Committee for the Lay Apostolate.

== Episcopacy ==
On 14 July 2015, Son was appointed Titular Bishop of Camplum and Auxiliary Bishop of Seoul by Pope Francis. His episcopal ordination took place on 28 August 2015, with Archbishop of Seoul Andrew Yeom Soo-jung serving as principal consecrator, and auxiliary bishops of Seoul Timothy Yu Gyoung-chon and Peter Chung Soon-taek serving as co-consecrators. Since 15 March 2016, Son has served as President of the Committee for the Doctrine of the Faith for the Catholic Bishop's Conference, and a member of the Episcopal Commission for Doctrine.

== Episcopal lineage ==
- Cardinal Scipione Rebiba
- Cardinal Giulio Antonio Santorio (1566)
- Cardinal Girolamo Bernerio, OP (1586)
- Archbishop Galeazzo Sanvitale (1604)
- Cardinal Ludovico Ludovisi (1621)
- Cardinal Luigi Caetani (1622)
- Cardinal Ulderico Carpegna (1630)
- Cardinal Paluzzo Paluzzi Altieri degli Albertoni (1666)
- Pope Benedict XIII (1675)
- Pope Benedict XIV (1724)
- Pope Clement XIII (1743)
- Cardinal Marco Antonio Colonna (1762)
- Cardinal Hyacinthe Sigismond Gerdil, CRSP (1777)
- Cardinal Giulio Maria della Somaglia (1788)
- Cardinal Carlo Odescalchi, SJ (1823)
- Bishop St. Eugène de Mazenod, OMI (1832)
- Archbishop Joseph-Hippolyte Guibert, OMI (1842)
- Cardinal François-Marie-Benjamin Richard (1872)
- Archbishop Gustave-Charles-Marie Mutel, MEP (1890)
- Bishop Andrien-Joseph Larribeau, MEP (1927)
- Archbishop Paul Marie Kinam Ro (1942)
- Archbishop Nicolas Cheong Jin-suk (1970)
- Archbishop Andrew Yeom Soo-jung (2002)
- Bishop Benedictus Son Hee-song (2015)

Catholic Church titles
Preceded by Peter Lee Ki-heon	Bishop of Uijeongbu; 2024–present	Succeeded by Incumbent
