= Paul Kim Tchang-ryeol =

South Korean Roman Catholic prelate (born 1927)

Most Reverend Paul Kim Tchang-ryeol
- Bishop Emeritus of Jeju
- Church: Roman Catholic Church
- Appointed: 11 November 1983
- Retired: 15 July 2002
- Predecessor: Michael Pak Jeong-il
- Successor: Peter Kang U-il

Orders
- Ordination: 22 August 1953 (Priest)
- Consecration: 6 January 1984 (Bishop) by Pope John Paul II

Personal details
- Born: Paul Kim Tchang-ryeol; 25 January 1927 (age 99) Yonan, Korea, Empire of Japan
- Education: Seoul Sungshin University, Pontifical Lateran University

Paul Kim Tchang-ryeol (Korean: 김창렬 바오로; Hanja: 金昌烈; born 25 January 1927) is a South Korean Roman Catholic prelate, who served as a Diocesan Bishop of Jeju (1983–2002).

== Biography ==
He was born in then Yeonbaek County of the Hwanghae Province and graduated from the Department of Theology at the Seoul Sungshin University (now Catholic University of Korea) in 1950. He was ordained priest three years later, on 22 August 1953 for the Vicariate Apostolic of Seoul and after studied at the Pontifical Lateran University. After the return to his Diocese, he served as a teacher at Sungshin Middle and High School in Seoul, the head of the Virgin Hospital in the Faculty of Medicine of the Catholic University, the dean of the Catholic University, and the director of the Catholic Central Medical Center.

Pope John Paul II appointed him on 11 November 1983 as the third Bishop of Jeju and consecrated him as bishop on 6 January 1984 at the San Pietro Basilica in Rome, where he served until his retirement on 15 July 2002, because of the age limit.

Catholic Church titles
Preceded by Michael Pak Jeong-il	Bishop of Jeju; 1983–2002	Succeeded by Peter Kang U-il
