= Military Ordinariate of Korea =

Catholic ecclesiastical jurisdiction in South Korea

Coordinates: 37.5500°N 126.9830°E

Military Ordinariate of Korea Ordinariatus Militaris Corea

Location
- Country: Korea
- Ecclesiastical province: Immediately subject to the Holy See

Statistics
- Population: 87,093
- Churches: 95

Information
- Denomination: Catholic Church
- Sui iuris church: Latin Church
- Rite: Roman Rite
- Established: 22 November 1983 (42 years ago)
- Cathedral: Our Lady of the Assumption Cathedral, Yongsan-gu, Seoul
- Patron saint: Ignatius of Loyola

Current leadership
- Pope: Leo XIV
- Bishop: Titus Seo Sang-bum
- Bishops emeritus: Francis Xavier Yu Soo-il, O.F.M.

Website
- www.gunjong.or.kr

Korean name
- Hangul: 천주교 군종교구
- Hanja: 天主敎 軍宗敎區
- Revised Romanization: Cheonjugyo Gunjonggyogu
- McCune–Reischauer: Ch'ŏnjugyo Kunjonggyogu

The Military Ordinariate of Korea is a military ordinariate of the Catholic Church. Immediately subject to the Holy See, it provides pastoral care to Catholics serving in the Republic of Korea (South Korea) Armed Forces and their families.

== History ==
It was established as a military vicariate on 22 November 1983 and elevated to a military ordinariate on 21 July 1986.

== Office holders ==
=== Military vicars ===
- Angelo Kim Nam-su (1983–1986)

=== Military ordinaries ===
- Angelo Kim Nam-su (1986–1989)
- Augustine Cheong Myong-jo (1989–1998), appointed Coadjutor Bishop of Pusan
- Peter Lee Ki-heon (1999–2010), appointed Coadjutor Bishop of Uijeongbu
- Francis Xavier Yu Soo-il, O.F.M. (2010–2021)
- Titus Seo Sang-bum (2021–present)
