= Thaddeus Cho Hwan-kil =

South Korean Roman Catholic priest

- Archbishop of Daegu
- Church: Roman Catholic Church
- Archdiocese: Daegu

Orders
- Ordination: 19 March 1981
- Consecration: 30 April 2007

Personal details
- Born: November 7, 1954 (age 71) Dalseong County, Daegu, Korea

Korean name
- Hangul: 조환길
- Hanja: 曺煥吉
- RR: Jo Hwangil
- MR: Cho Hwan'gil

Thaddeus Cho Hwan-kil (Korean: 조환길 타대오; Hanja: 曺煥吉; born 7 November 1954) is a South Korean prelate of the Catholic Church. He is the tenth and current Archbishop of Daegu, having been appointed by Pope Benedict XVI in 2010.

== Early life ==
The fourth of eight children, Cho was born in Dalseong County, Daegu, to Raymund Cho Sun-jo (조순조 라이문도, d. 2000) and Nympha Na Il-nam(나일남 님파).

== Priesthood and Auxiliary Bishop of Daegu ==
After being ordained to the Priesthood in 1981, Cho served as the Pastor of Deoksoo Parish and Hyeonggok Parish of Daegu, Director of Gwandeokjeong Martyrs' Memorial in Daegu, President of Maeil Newspaper of Daegu, and was appointed as an Auxiliary Bishop of Daegu and Titular Bishop of Abbir Maius on March 23, 2007. He received his episcopal consecration on the following April 3 from Archbishop John Choi Young-su, with Bishop John Chrisostom Kwon Hyok-ju, Bishop of Andong and Bishop Augustine Cheong Myong-jo, Bishop of Busan serving as co-consecrators. He chose as his episcopal motto: Sicut erat in principio, et nunc, et semper, et in saecula saeculorum, meaning "Both now and always, and unto the ages of ages" (처음과 같이 이제와 항상 영원히).

With Archbishop John Choi Young-su's resignation in 2009, Cho had been acting as the Vicar General of the Daegu until 2010.

== Archbishop of Daegu ==
On November 4, 2010, Cho was appointed the tenth Archbishop of Daegu by Pope Benedict XVI. He was formally installed at the Gyesan-dong Cathedral of Our Lady of Lourdes on December 20, 2010. He received the pallium, a vestment worn by metropolitan bishops, from Pope Benedict XVI on June 29, 2011, in a ceremony at St. Peter's Basilica.

Catholic Church titles
Preceded by Bernard Jacqueline	— TITULAR — Titular Bishop of Abbir Maius; 23 March 2007 – 4 November 2010	Succeeded by Miguel Olaortúa Laspra
Preceded by John Choi Young-su	Archbishop of Daegu; 4 November 2010 – present	Incumbent
