= Leo Schwarz =

German Catholic bishop (1931–2018)

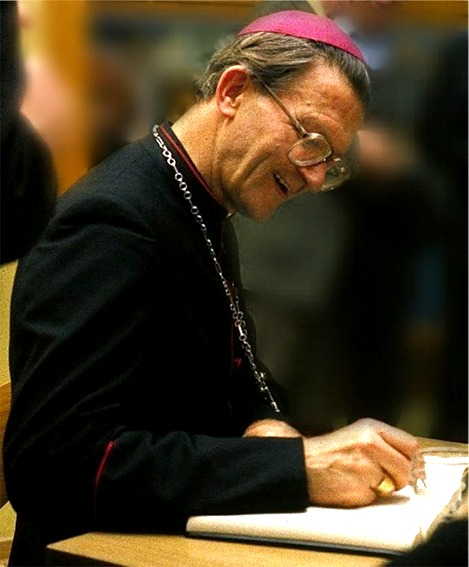
Schwarz, Leo 1984

Coat of arms of Leo Schwarz

Leo Schwarz (9 October 1931 in Braunweiler – 26 November 2018) was from 1982 to 2006 the Roman Catholic auxiliary bishop in the diocese of Trier, and was titular bishop of Abbir Germaniciana.

As Auxiliary Bishop, Schwarz also built the Relief Renovabis (Solidarity action of German Catholics with the people in Central and Eastern Europe). For ten years he was also Chairman of the German Commission for the Church's peace organization Justitia et Pax. From 2005 until his death, Schwarz was President of the European Commission for Justice and Peace, continuing in this role after submitting his resignation as a bishop.
