= Peter Lee Ki-heon =

Catholic bishop

- Bishop Emeritus of Uijeongbu
- Native name: 베드로 이기헌
- Church: Catholic Church
- Diocese: Diocese of Uijeongbu
- In office: 26 February 2010 – 13 March 2024
- Predecessor: Joseph Lee Han-taek
- Successor: Benedictus Son Hee-song
- Previous posts: Apostolic Administrator of Uijeongbu (2024); Bishop of the Military Ordinariate of Korea (1999-2010)

Orders
- Ordination: 8 December 1975 by Stephen Kim Sou-hwan
- Consecration: 14 December 1999 by Stephen Kim Sou-hwan

Personal details
- Born: 31 December 1947 (age 78) Pyongyang, North Korea, Soviet Civil Administration

Peter Lee Ki-heon (Korean: 이기헌 베드로; Hanja: 李基憲; born December 31, 1947) is a Korean prelate of the Roman Catholic Church. He served as head of the Military Ordinariate of Korea from 1998 to 2010. He is the second and current Bishop of Uijeongbu, having been appointed by Pope Benedict XVI in 2010.

Catholic Church titles
| Preceded by Augustine Cheong Myong-jo | Military Ordinariate of Korea; 1999–2010 | Succeeded by Francis Xavier Yu Soo-il |
| Preceded by Joseph Lee Han-taek | Bishop of Uijeongbu; 2010–2024 | Succeeded by Benedictus Son Hee-song |
