= Pardy Island Formation =

- Stratigraphic range: Neoproterozoic
- Type: Formation
- Unit of: Burin Group

Lithology
- Primary: Marine mafic volcanics

Location
- Region: Newfoundland
- Country: Canada
- Occurrence of the Pardy Island Formation in southeastern Newfoundland

The Pardy Island Formation is a formation cropping out in Newfoundland.
