= Augustine Cheong Myong-jo =

Korean Roman Catholic Church prelate (1935–2007)

- Bishop of Busan
- Native name: 정명조
- Church: Catholic Church
- Diocese: Busan
- Installed: August 28, 1999
- Term ended: June 1, 2007
- Predecessor: Gabriel Lee Gab-sou
- Successor: Paul Hwang Cheol-soo
- Previous posts: Titular Bishop of Tubulbaca (1989–1998); Military Ordinary of Korea (1989–1998)

Orders
- Ordination: December 22, 1962
- Consecration: February 13, 1990 by Stephen Kim Sou-hwan

Personal details
- Born: Cheong Myong-jo; May 25, 1935 Geoje, Keishōnan-dō, Chōsen, Japanese Empire
- Died: June 1, 2007 (aged 72)

Augustine Cheong Myong-jo (Korean: 정명조 아우구스티노; Hanja: 鄭明祚; May 25, 1935 – June 1, 2007) was a Roman Catholic bishop in South Korea.

His family origin was Chogye. His baptismal name was Augustine. He served as the bishop of the Diocese of Busan and the Bishop of the Military Ordinariate.

== Biography ==
- 1935: Born in Geoje, South Gyongsang Province.
- 1962: Graduated from the Catholic University of Korea and ordained a priest.
- 1963: Assistant Priest at Jinhae Church, South Gyeongsang Province.
- 1964: Assistant Priest at Songdo Church, Busan, and Pastor at Geochang Church, South Gyeongsang Province.
- 1965: Commissioned as a Second Lieutenant in the Army.
- 1968: Served in the Vietnam War.
- 1978: Director of the Education Division, Ministry of National Defense, Military Chaplaincy Office; awarded the Republic of Korea Order of Merit for National Security.
- 1985: Retired as a colonel and priest at Namcheon-dong Church, Busan.
- 1989: Appointed Bishop of the Military Ordinariate.
- 1990: Ordained Bishop.
- 1999: Appointed as the third Bishop of the Diocese of Busan and Secretary General of the Catholic Bishops' Conference of Korea.
- 2005: President of the Catholic Bishops' Conference of Korea.
- 2007: Died.

Catholic Church titles
Preceded by none	Military Ordinariate of Korea; 1989–1998	Succeeded by Peter Lee Ki-heon
Preceded by Gabriel Lee Gab-sou	Bishop of Busan; 1999–2007	Succeeded by Paul Hwang Chul-soo
