= Immaculate Conception Cathedral, Jeju =

Immaculate Conception Cathedral
- 중앙성당
- Location within South Korea
- Immaculate Conception Cathedral
- 33°30′42″N 126°31′22″E
- Location: Jeju
- Country: South Korea
- Denomination: Roman Catholic Church

The Immaculate Conception Cathedral (Korean: 중앙성당), also called Jungang Cathedral of the Immaculate Conception of Mary and locally Jungang Cathedral, is a religious building located in Jeju City, South Korea.

The temple follows the Roman or Latin rite and is the principal church of the Diocese of Jeju (Dioecesis Cheiuensis. 제주 교구) which was raised to its current status in 1977 by Pope Paul VI by bull "Munus Apostolicum".

It is under the pastoral responsibility of Bishop Peter Kang U-il.

== See also ==
- Roman Catholicism in South Korea
- Immaculate Conception Cathedral (disambiguation)
