= Paul Ri Moun-hi =

South Korean priest (1935–2021)

Paul Ri Moun-hi (14 September 1935 – 14 March 2021) was a South Korean Roman Catholic archbishop.

Ri Moun-hi was born in South Korea and was ordained to the priesthood in 1965. He served as auxiliary bishop, coadjutor archbishop and archbishop of the Roman Catholic Archdiocese of Daegu, South Korea, from 1972 until 2007.
