= James Kim Ji-seok =

Most Reverend James Kim Ji-seok
- Bishop of the Roman Catholic Diocese of Wonju
- Church: Catholic Church
- Diocese: Roman Catholic Diocese of Wonju
- Appointed: November 19, 1990
- Predecessor: Daniel Tji Hak Soun

Orders
- Ordination: June 29, 1968
- Consecration: January 14, 1991 by Daniel Tji Hak Soun

Personal details
- Born: July 27, 1940 (age 85) Wonju, Korea, Empire of Japan (today South Korea)

James Kim Ji-seok (김지석, born July 27, 1940) is bishop of the Roman Catholic Diocese of Wonju.

== Biography ==
James Kim Ji-seok was ordained a priest on June 29, 1968.

On November 19, 1990, Pope John Paul II appointed him Coadjutor Bishop of Wonju. He was consecrated bishop on January 14, 1991 by Daniel Tji Hak Soun. Co-consecrators were the Archbishop of Seoul, Cardinal Stephen Kim Sou-hwan, and the Apostolic Nuncio to South Korea, Archbishop Ivan Dias. On March 12, 1993 he succeeded Daniel Tji Hak Soun.
