= Abbir Maius =

Coordinates: 36.374°N 10.009°E

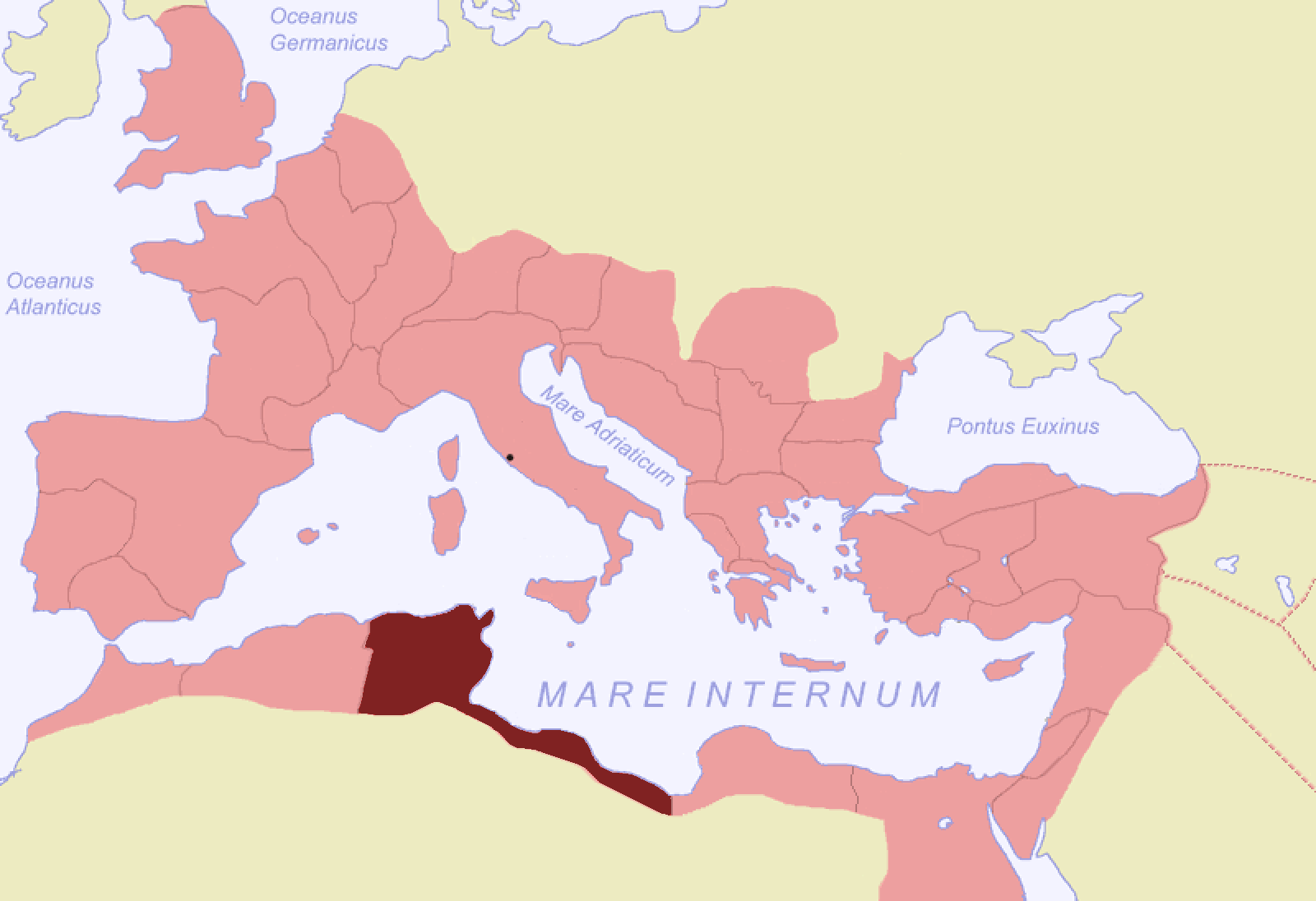
Africa Proconsularis

Abbir Maius also known as Abbiritanus was a Roman and Byzantine-era civitas (city), later municipium, in the Roman province of Africa proconsularis (today northern Tunisia).

== Location ==
The town is identified through inscriptions with ruins near Henchir el Khandaq in Zaghouan Governorate (latitude 36.374, longitude 10.008826 ). This is near the village of Bir Halima between El Fahs and Zaghouan. In Roman times this would have placed the city in the bread basket Medjerda River Valley, south of Carthage.

== Facilities ==
The city had an aqueduct, completed by procurator Q. Geminius Faustus and bath house. And, like Thignica, was a civitas dependent of Carthage but under the emperor Caracalla was promoted to be a municipium.

== Bishopric ==
The city was also the seat of a bishopric, in the ecclesiastical province of Carthage. The only known Bishop of antiquity was Felix fl436-484, who was bishop of the town for 44 years and sent into exile under the Vandals.

Although the bishopric ceased to effectively function at the end of the 7th century with the arrival of the Islamic armies, Titular Bishops have been be appointed to the diocese since the beginning of the 20th century. The bishop presently assigned to the Titular See is Ruben Caballero Labajo, Auxiliary Bishop of the Archdiocese of Cebu, appointed in 23 June 2022.

== See also ==
- Abbir Germaniciana
