= Diocese of Andong =

Roman Catholic diocese in South Korea

Coordinates: 36.5844°N 128.7350°E

Diocese of Andong Dioecesis Andongensis 안동교구

Location
- Country: South Korea
- Territory: Northern part of North Gyeongsang
- Ecclesiastical province: Daegu
- Metropolitan: Daegu

Statistics
- Area: 10,781 km^{2} (4,163 sq mi)
- Population: Total; Catholics: (as of 2017); 717,858; 51,359 (7.2%)
- Parishes: 38

Information
- Denomination: Catholic
- Sui iuris church: Latin Church
- Rite: Roman Rite
- Established: 29 May 1969 (56 years ago)
- Cathedral: Cathedral of the Immaculate Conception in Andong

Current leadership
- Pope: Leo XIV
- Bishop: John Chrisostom Kwon Hyeok-ju
- Metropolitan Archbishop: Thaddeus Cho Hwan-gil

Map

Website
- acatholic.or.kr

The Roman Catholic Diocese of Andong (Latin: Dioecesis Andongensis) is a diocese of the Latin Church of the Catholic Church located in Andong, South Korea. The diocese is suffragan to the Archdiocese of Daegu.

== History ==
On 29 May 1969 Pope Paul VI established the Diocese of Andong from territory taken from the Archdiocese of Daegu and the Diocese of Wonju.

== Ordinaries ==
- René Marie Albert Dupont (1969–1990)
- Ignatius Pak Sok-hi (1990–2000)
- John Chrisostom Kwon Hyeok-ju (2001–present)
