= Sebkhet el Kourzia =

- Location within Tunisia
- Location: Tunisia
- Coordinates: 36°25′57″N 9°46′14″E
- Type: Intermittent lake

Sebkhet el Kourzia is an Intermittent lake in Tunisia near Jebel Zebes and Koudiat er Roha. It is located at 36°25′57″N 9°46′14″E.
