= John A. Choi Jae-seon =

South Korean bishop (1912–2008)

- Bishop of Diocese of Pusan (emeritus)
- Church: Roman Catholic Church
- See: Diocese of Pusan
- In office: 1957–1973
- Predecessor: None
- Successor: Gabriel Lee Gab-sou
- Previous post: Priest

Orders
- Ordination: June 11, 1938

Personal details
- Born: January 7, 1912 Ulsan, South Korea
- Died: June 3, 2008 (aged 96) Pusan, South Korea

John A. Choi Jae-seon (January 7, 1912 – June 3, 2008) was a South Korean prelate of the Roman Catholic Church.

Jae-seon was born in Ulsan, South Korea, and was ordained a priest on June 11, 1938, in the Diocese of Pusan. Jae-seon was appointed a vicar apostolic for the Diocese of Pusan as well as Titular Bishop of Fussala on January 26, 1957, and was ordained on May 26, 1957. He was appointed bishop of Diocese of Pusan on March 10, 1962, but resigned on September 19, 1973, after being appointed Titular Bishop of Tanaramusa.

Jae-Seon died on June 3, 2008, at age of 96.

During the Vietnam War (1956-1975) he was known for giving Saint Christopher medals and Rosaries and giving them out to American G.I.s on R & R in Japan (also to GIs stationed as peacekeeping forces in South Korea). The medals were inscribed with the veteran's initials.

It was erroneously believed that the Bishop gave out Saint Christopher medals during the Korean War but he wasn't a bishop until 1957 (4 years after the cease fire was signed).

== See also ==
- Diocese of Pusan
