= James Vincent Pardy =

American-born Catholic missionary and bishop (1898–1983)

The Most Reverend James V. Pardy, M.M.
- Bishop of Cheongju
- Church: Catholic Church
- Appointed: March 10, 1962
- Term ended: April 18, 1972
- Successor: Nicolas Cheong Jin-suk (정진석 니콜라오)
- Previous post: Vicar Apostolic of Cheong-ju (1958–1962)

Orders
- Ordination: January 26, 1930
- Consecration: September 16, 1958 by Bryan Joseph McEntegart

Personal details
- Born: March 9, 1898 Brooklyn, New York
- Died: February 15, 1983 (aged 84) Mountain View, California
- Coat of arms

James Vincent Pardy, M.M.,파 야고보, (March 9, 1898 - February 15, 1983) was an American-born Catholic missionary and bishop. As a member of the Catholic Foreign Mission Society of America (Maryknoll) he was assigned to missions in South Korea. He served as the first Bishop of Cheongju from 1962 to 1972.

== Early life and education ==
James Pardy was born in Brooklyn, New York, the son of William and Sara (McCarran) Pardy and was one of 11 children. He was educated in the local public schools and the New York Preparatory School. He received a Bachelor of Arts degree from St. Francis College in Brooklyn Heights before he entered the novitiate for the Catholic Foreign Mission Society of America, or Maryknoll, and professed religious vows in 1925. Pardy earned a Bachelor of Sacred Theology degree from The Catholic University of America. He was ordained a priest on January 26, 1930.

== Priesthood ==
After his ordination Pardy taught at the Maryknoll Minor Seminary for two years after which he was assigned to the mission field in Korea. In 1939 he became the superior of the Maryknollers in Korea. During World War II he served as a military chaplain in the United States Army attaining the rank of Major. He was captured by the Japanese and interned for ten months. For his service to the Prisoners of war in South Korea, Pardy was awarded the Medal of Freedom. From 1945 to 1948 Pardy served as the rector on the Maryknoll Minor Seminary and then as the director of the formation of candidates from 1948 to 1951. That year he was sent back to South Korea where he once again became the superior of all the Maryknollers in Korea in 1953. He was elected as the Maryknoll Vicar General in 1956. Pope Pius XII named Pardy the Titular Bishop of Irenopolis in Isauria and Vicar Apostolic of Cheongju on July 4, 1958.

== Episcopacy ==
James Pardy was consecrated a bishop on September 16, 1958, by Bishop Bryan McEntegart of Brooklyn. The principal co-consecrators were U.S. Military Auxiliary Bishop Philip Furlong and Bishop Christopher Weldon of Springfield in Massachusetts. Bishop Fulton Sheen delivered the sermon. At his consecration he was given the crosier used by Cardinal John McCloskey of New York and Bishop Patrick Byrne, M.M., who died on a death march to the Yalu River. On March 10, 1962 Pope John XXIII named Pardy as the first bishop of the Diocese of Cheongju. He attended all four sessions of the Second Vatican Council (1962–1965). Pope Paul VI accepted Bishop Pardy's resignation as Bishop of Cheongju on April 18, 1972.

== Later life and death ==
Bishop Pardy died at El Camino Real Hospital in Mountain View, California, on February 15, 1983, at the age of 84. His funeral was celebrated in the Maryknoll Chapel in New York and he was buried in the Maryknoll Cemetery.
