= Archdiocese of Daegu =

Roman Catholic archdiocese in South Korea

Coordinates: 35.860626°N 128.586982°E

Archdiocese of Daegu Archidioecesis Taeguensis 대구대교구
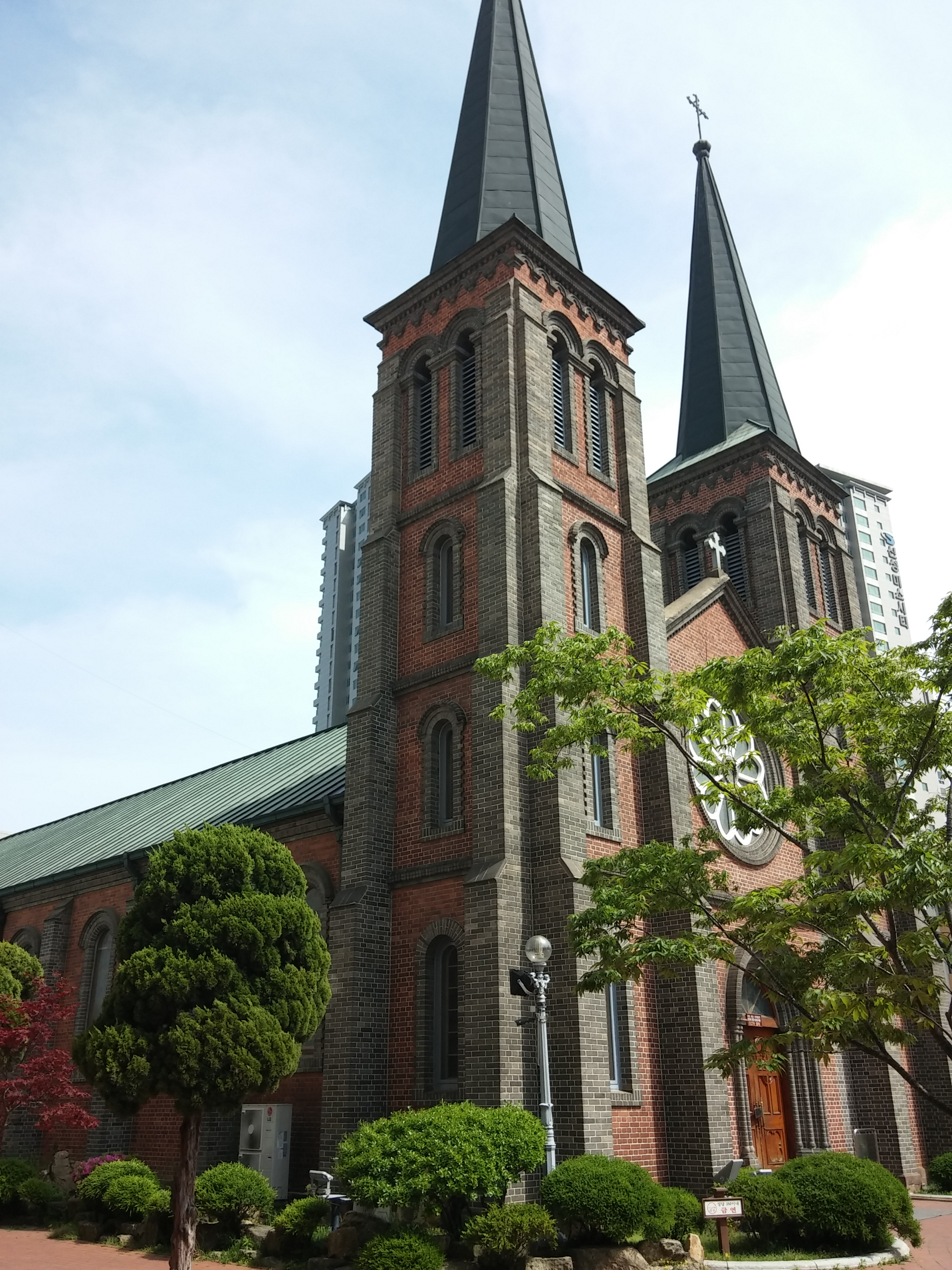
- Gyesan-dong Cathedral of Our Lady of Lourdes

Location
- Country: South Korea
- Territory: Daegu
- Ecclesiastical province: Daegu

Statistics
- Area: 9,129 km^{2} (3,525 sq mi)
- Population: Total; Catholics: (as of 2020); 4,476,518; 511,757 (11.4%)
- Parishes: 164

Information
- Denomination: Catholic
- Sui iuris church: Latin Church
- Rite: Roman Rite
- Established: April 8, 1911 (as Apostolic Vicariate); March 10, 1962 (as Archdiocese)
- Cathedral: Our Lady of Lourdes Cathedral, Daegu
- Co-cathedral: Beomeo Cathedral of St. Francis of Assisi
- Patron saint: Our Lady of Lourdes; St John Yi Yun-il

Current leadership
- Pope: Leo XIV
- Archbishop: Thaddeus Cho Hwan-Kil
- Auxiliary Bishops: John Bosco Chang Shin-ho

Map

Website
- daegu-archdiocese.or.kr

The Archdiocese of Daegu (previously known as Taiku or Taegu) is a particular church of the Latin Church of the Catholic Church. The Archbishop of Daegu, whose seat is at Kyesan Cathedral in Daegu, is Metropolitan bishop for the Dioceses of Andong, Cheongju, Masan, and Busan.

It is the second oldest episcopal see in Korea, erected as an apostolic vicariate on April 8, 1911, from the Apostolic Vicariate of Korea. It was elevated to archdiocesan status on March 10, 1962.

== Leadership ==
=== Ordinaries ===
==== Apostolic Vicars of Taiku ====
- Florian-Jean-Baptiste Démange (1911–1938)
- Jean-Germain Mousset, M.E.P. (1938–1942)
- Ireneus Hayasaka Kyubei (1942–1946)
- Paul Chu Jae-yong (1946–1948)
- Paul Roh Ki-nam (1948; apostolic administrator); also Titular bishop of Colbasa
- John Baptist Choi Deok-hong (1948–1954)
- John Baptist Sye Bong-kil (1955–1962)

==== Archbishops of Daegu ====
- John Baptist Sye Bong-kil (1962–1986)
- Paul Ri Moun-hi (1986–2007)
- John Choi Young-su (2007–2009)
- Thaddeus Cho Hwan-Kil (2010–present)

=== Coadjutor Bishops ===
- Paul Ri Moun-hi (1985–1986)
- John Choi Young-su (2006–2007)

=== Auxiliary Bishops ===
- Paul Ri Moun-hi (1972–1985)
- Alexander Sye Cheong-duk (1994–2001)
- John Choi Young-su (2000–2006)
- Thaddeus Cho Hwan-gil (2007–2010)
- John Bosco Chang Shin-ho (2016–present)
