= Diocese of Busan (Catholic) =

Latin Catholic diocese in South Korea

Coordinates: 35.1000°N 129.0330°E

Diocese of Busan Dioecesis Busanensis 부산교구
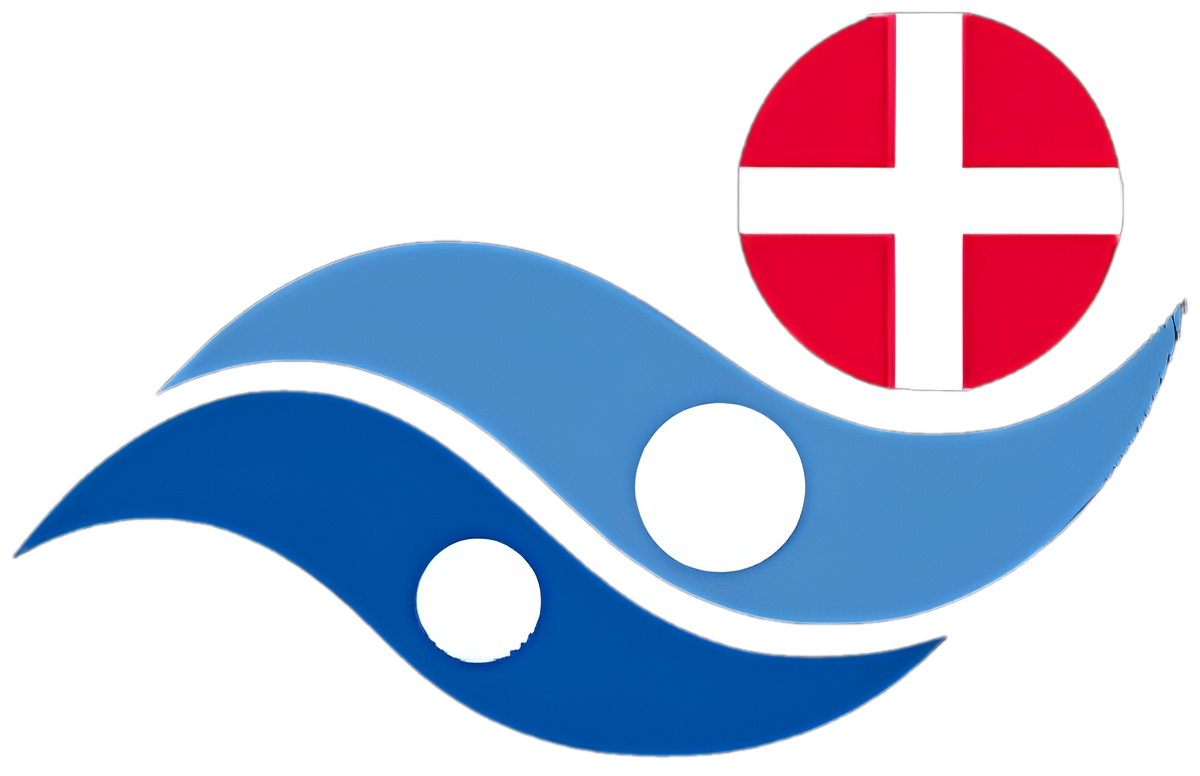
- Coat of arms

Location
- Country: South Korea
- Territory: Busan and Ulsan
- Ecclesiastical province: Daegu
- Metropolitan: Daegu

Statistics
- Area: 3,267 km^{2} (1,261 sq mi)
- Population: Total; Catholics: (as of 2017); 5,613,436; 454,890 (8.1%)
- Parishes: 124

Information
- Denomination: Catholic
- Sui iuris church: Latin Church
- Rite: Roman Rite
- Established: January 21, 1957 (As Apostolic Vicariate); March 10, 1962 (As Diocese)
- Cathedral: Namcheon Cathedral of St. Paul Chong Hasang
- Co-cathedral: Jungang Co-Cathedral of the Holy Cross

Current leadership
- Pope: Leo XIV
- Bishop: Joseph Son Sam-seok
- Metropolitan Archbishop: Thaddeus Cho Hwan-kil
- Auxiliary Bishops: Pius Sin Hozol
- Bishops emeritus: Paul Hwang Chul-soo

Map

Website
- catholicbusan.or.kr

The Diocese of Busan (Latin: Dioecesis Busanensis) is a diocese of the Latin Church of the Catholic Church located in Busan, South Korea.

== History ==
On 21 January 1957 Pope Pius XII erected as an Apostolic Vicariate of Busan. It was elevated to a diocese by Pope John XXIII on 10 March 1962.

== Leadership ==
=== Ordinaries ===
==== Apostolic Vicars of Pusan ====
- John A. Choi Jae-seon (1957–1962)

==== Bishops of Busan ====
- John A. Choi Jae-seon (1962–1973)
- Gabriel Lee Gab-sou (1975–1999)
- Augustine Cheong Myong-jo (1999–2007)
- Paul Hwang Chul-soo (2007–2018)
- Joseph Son Sam-seok (2019–present)

=== Coadjutor Bishops ===
- Augustine Cheong Myong-jo (1998–1999)

=== Auxiliary Bishops ===
- Gabriel Lee Gab-sou (1971–1975)
- Paul Hwang Chul-soo (2006–2007)
- Joseph Son Sam-seok (2010–2019)
- Pius Sin Hozol (2021–present)
