= Cistercian nuns =

Female members of the Cistercian Order

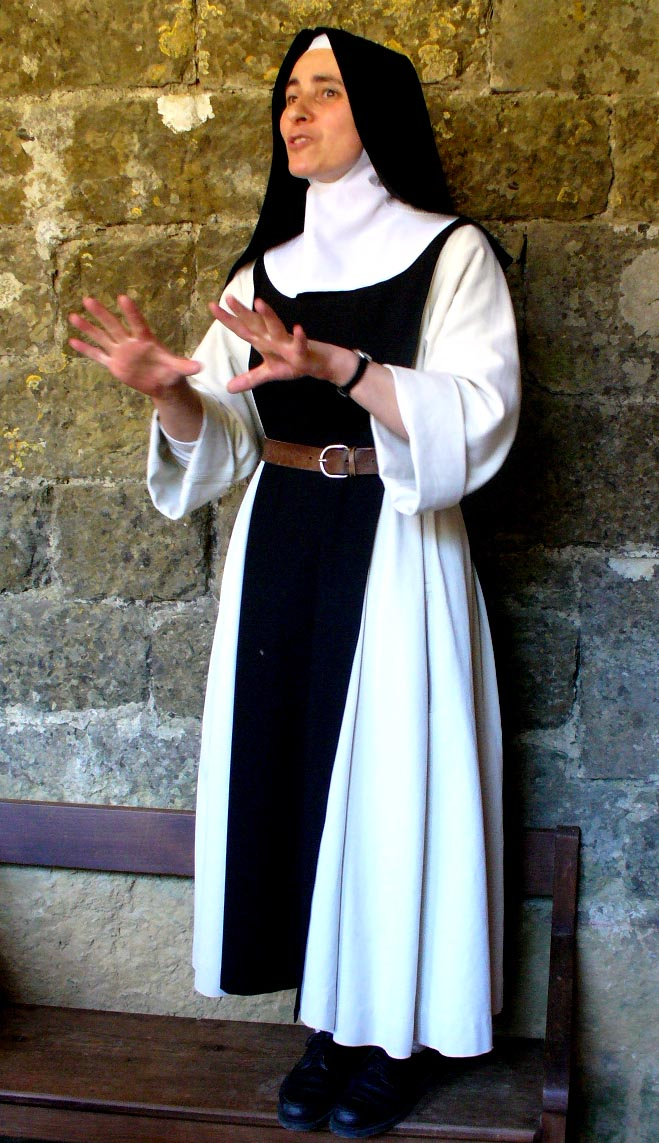
A nun of the Cistercian Abbey of Our Lady of Rieunette, near Carcassonne, France (2006)

Cistercian nuns are female members of the Cistercian Order, a religious order of the Catholic Church.

== History ==
The Cistercian Order was initially a male order. Cistercian female monasteries began to appear by 1125. The first Cistercian monastery for women, Le Tart Abbey, was established at Tart-l'Abbaye in the Diocese of Langres (now Dijon) in 1125, by nuns from the Benedictine monastery of Juilly, and with the cooperation of Stephen Harding, abbot of Cîteaux. At Juilly, a dependency of Molesme Abbey, Humbeline, the sister of Saint Bernard of Clairvaux, lived and died.

The Cistercian nuns of Le Tart founded daughter houses in Europe, including at Ferraque (1140) in the Diocese of Noyon, Blandecques (1153) in the Diocese of St-Omer, and Montreuil-les-Dames (1164) near Laon. Charity work was central to the activities of the Cistercian nunneries, and some were given specific responsibilities, such as Notre-Dame-de-Bondeville (founded between 1128 and 1154), in Seine-Maritime, Normandy, which sheltered young girls and mentally impaired laywomen.

In Spain, the first Cistercian house of women was that of Tulebras (1134) in the Kingdom of Navarre. Then came Santa María la Real de las Huelgas (Valladolid) (1140), Espírito Santo Olmedo (1142), Villabona, or San Miguel de las Dueñas (1155), Perales (1160), Gradefes (1168), Cañas (1169) and others. The most celebrated was Santa María la Real de Las Huelgas near Burgos, founded in 1187 by Alfonso VIII of Castile. The observance was established there by Cistercian nuns who came from Tulebras, under the guidance of Misol, who became its first abbess. The second abbess was Constance, daughter of the founder, who believed she had the power of preaching in her church and hearing confessions of her religious. In 1190, the eighteen abbesses of France held their first general chapter at Tart. The abbesses of France and Spain themselves made the regular visits to their houses of filiation. The Council of Trent, by its decrees regarding the cloister of nuns, put an end to the chapter and the visits.

In 12th century England, up to thirty rural houses of nuns followed Cistercian practices, with only a minority receiving documentation from the Papacy to confirm this. The fully incorporated English nunneries were Tarrant Kaines in Dorset and Marham Abbey in Norfolk. As Williams has recorded: "Six Lincolnshire nunneries that claimed to belong to the Order and whose nuns wore the Cistercian habit, were exempted by King Henry III from taxation in 1268 on account of their status yet the abbot of Cîteaux wrote to the dean of Lincoln maintaining that even though they wore the white habit they were not members of the Order."

In Italy, 1171 CE, houses were founded of Santa Lucia at Syracuse, San Michele at Ivrea, and that of Conversano, the only one in the peninsula in which the abbesses carry a crosier.

By a century later the Cistercian nuns had established houses in Switzerland, Germany (St. Marienthal Abbey in 1234), and Flanders, and more had been established in France, England and Spain. Many of these new foundations were initiated by noble women. La Ramée (1216) in Jodoigne, was an important centre of learning, where Cistercian nun Ida the Gentle of Goresleeuw copied and corrected church books and Beatrice of Nazareth supervised the production of an antiphonary. Some nunneries of this period were begun by lay groups of women. For example, La Cour Notre-Dame de Michery, in Sens, was originally a leprosarium (a hospital to care for people with leprosy), then was recognised as a Cistercian community in 1225–1226. In the 1220s, Bishop Jacques de Vitry wrote that the observance of nuns of the Cistercian Order had multiplied like the stars of heaven.

The decline which manifested itself in the communities of monks of the Cistercian Order from the middle of the fourteenth century was felt also in the monasteries of nuns, with approximately 20% of Cisterican nunneries in France suppressed during the Hundred Years War. At this time, the Conceptionist Order was founded in Toledo, Spain, by Beatrice of Silva. Her nuns abandoned the Cistercian Rule for that of the Poor Clares. In France Jeanne de Courcelles de Pourlan, having been elected Abbess of Tart in 1617, restored regular discipline in her community, which was transferred to Dijon in 1625. Owing to the hostility of the Abbot of Cîteaux to the reform Abbess de Pourlan had the Holy See withdraw her abbey from the jurisdiction of the Order of Cîteaux.

In 1602, another reform was effected at Port-Royal des Champs by Angélique Arnauld, who, to provide for the ever-increasing members of the community, founded Port-Royal de Paris, in the Faubourg of Saint-Jacques (1622). Queen Marie de Medicis declared herself protectress of this institution, and Pope Urban VIII exempted it from the jurisdiction of the Abbot of Cîteaux, placing it under that of Paris. The religious of Port-Royal de Paris and of Port-Royal des Champs ended by consecrating themselves to the adoration of the Blessed Sacrament.

However, the vicinity of the Abbé de Saint-Cyran became dangerous for them, and they saw the suppression and destruction of Port-Royal des Champs by order of the Louis XIV in 1710, while they themselves were dispersed. The property and abbatial titles were annexed to Port-Royal de Paris, which subsisted up to the time of the French Revolution, before being transformed first into a prison, and then into a maternity hospital.

After the French Revolution another reform took place. Augustin de Lestrange gathered the scattered Cistercian nuns of France, with members of other orders that had been equally dispersed, and reconstructed the Cistercian Sisterhood. In 1795, he gave them a monastery which he called the Holy Will of God (La Sainte-Volonté de Dieu), situated in the Bas-Valais, Switzerland. The Trappistines, for so the new religious were called, were obliged to leave Switzerland in 1798. They followed the Trappist monks in their travels over Europe, returned to Switzerland in 1803, and remained there until 1816, when at length they were able to return to France and take up their abode at Forges, near La Trappe. Two years later they occupied an old monastery of the Augustinians at Les Gardes, in the Diocese of Angers. The Trappistines spread over France, and into other countries of Europe. Since the reunion of the three congregations of La Trappe, in 1892, they have been officially entitled Reformed Cistercians of the Strict Observance.

== Statutes ==
The status of Cistercian nuns had been ambiguous from the start. Over time, the Cistercian orders put more and more restrictions on the female branch. For example, by 1213, the number of nuns in a house was limited by the supervising abbot if necessary. In addition, the nuns could receive no visitors without permission.

== In North America ==
A Cistercian novice who came from Europe at the same time as the Trappists, and who was joined by seventeen women from the United States, tried to establish a community, but circumstances prevented its success.

Vincent de Paul (born Jacques Merle; 1769–1853), at Tracadie, Nova Scotia, having asked the Congregation of Notre Dame of Montreal for three sisters to help him with his mission in Nova Scotia, established them there and, after probation, admitted them to the profession of simple vows of the Third Order of La Trappe. However, the community never in reality formed a part of the Order of Cîteaux nor wore the Cistercian habit.

The Monastery of Our Lady of Good Counsel, at Saint-Romuald near Quebec City, the first genuine community of Cistercian nuns in America, was established in 1902 by Hémery Lutgarde, Prioress of Bonneval, France, when on 21 November 1902, she brought a small colony of religious women.

On 29 July of the following year, Cyrille Alfred Marois, as delegate of the Archbishop of Quebec, blessed the new monastery. The means of subsistence for this house were agricultural labour and the manufacture of chocolate. The community was under the direction of the Archbishop of Quebec. Another, Notre-Dame de l'Assomption Abbey at Nouvelle-Arcadie, New Brunswick, where there were already some Cistercian monks, was established by the sisters expelled by the French Government from their Monastery of Vaise, at Lyon.

== Monasteries of Cistercian nuns of the Strict Observance ==
=== Africa ===
- Angola: Huambo, Luanda
- Benin: Parakou
- Cameroon: Obout
- Democratic Republic of the Congo: Kinshasa
- Madagascar: Ampibanjinana
- Nigeria: Abakaliki
- Rwanda: Cyangugu, Kibungo
- Uganda: Masaka

=== Asia ===
- India: Kerala
- Indonesia: Salatiga
- Japan: Ajimu, Hakodate, Imari, Nishinomiya, Tochigi
- Philippines: South Cotabato
- South Korea: Kyongnam
- Syria: Midan-Aleppo

=== Europe ===
There are numerous monasteries scattered throughout Europe, with France having the largest number.

- Belgium: Bocholt, Bouillon, Brecht, Chimay, Fleurus and Tilff
- Czech Republic: Neveklov, Porta coeli Convent in Předklášteří
- France: Anduze, Arcis-le-Ponsart, Auros, Bernardvillé, Blauvac, Campénéac, Charmes, Échourgnac, Laval, Le Cayrol, Meymac, Roybon, St-Georges-des-Gardes and Troisvaux
- Germany: Dahlem, Donnersberg, St. Marienthal Abbey in Ostritz
- Hungary: Érd, Kismaros
- Ireland: Lismore
- Italy: Pisa, Rome and Vitorchiano
- Netherlands: Arnhem
- Norway: Tautra Abbey
- Portugal: Monastery of São Bento da Porta Aberta
- Spain: Alloz-Estella, Arévalo, Armenteira, Arnedo, Avila, Benaguasil, Burgos (Las Huelgas), Cañas, Carrizo de La Ribera, Cartagena, San Andrés de Arroyo and Tulebras
- Switzerland: Romont and Sierre
- United Kingdom: Holy Cross Abbey, Whitland in Wales

=== Latin America ===
- Argentina: Hinojo
- Brazil: Boa Vista
- Chile: Curicó
- Ecuador: Esmeraldas
- Mexico: Ciudad Hidalgo
- Nicaragua: Santo Tomas-Chontales
- Venezuela: El Tocuyo

=== North America ===
- Canada:
  - Nouvelle-Arcadie, New Brunswick
  - Saint-Benoît-Labre, Quebec
- US:
  - Our Lady of the Angels Monastery, Virginia in Crozet, Virginia
  - Our Lady of the Mississippi Abbey in Dubuque, Iowa
  - Santa Rita Abbey in Sonoita, Arizona
  - Our Lady of the Redwoods Abbey in Whitethorn, California
  - Mount Saint Mary's Abbey in Wrentham, Massachusetts

== See also ==
- Bernardines
- Category:Cistercian nuns
- María Vela y Cueto

== Notes ==
Attribution
