= Seed of the serpent =

Seed of the serpent may refer to:

- Seed of the Woman, Christian interpretation of Genesis 3:15, often as a Messianic prophecy
- Serpent seed, doctrine of William Branham and others that Eve mated with the serpent in Eden
