= St. Mary's Abbey, Glencairn =

Monastic Community of nuns in Ireland

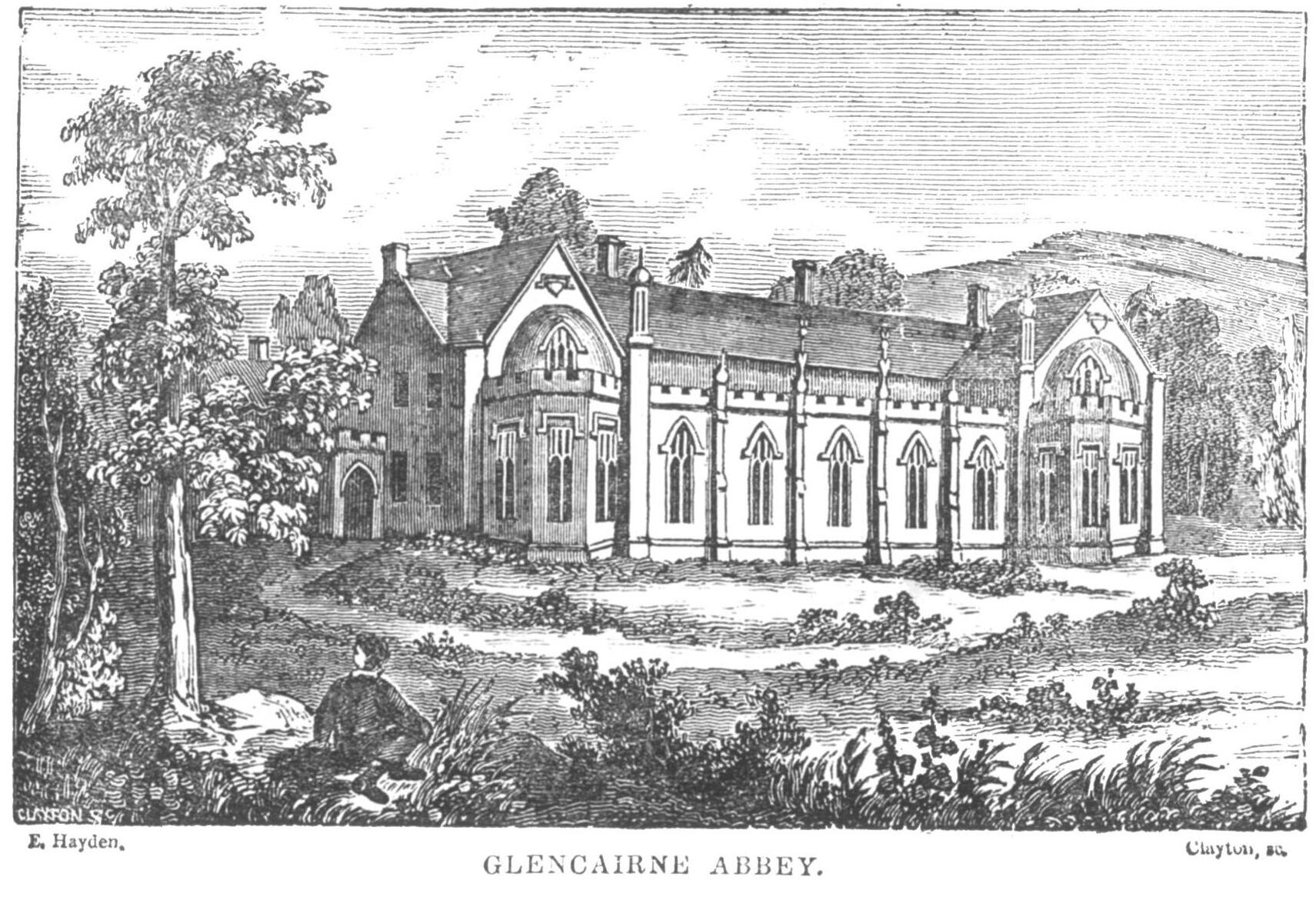
Illustration of "Glencairne Abbey" in Dublin Penny Journal (1835)

Saint Mary's Abbey, sometimes known as Glencairn Abbey, is a monastic community of nuns located in the townland of Glencairn, County Waterford, in Ireland. The community belongs to the Trappist branch of the Cistercian order, thus the nuns are also referred to as Trappistines.

== Location ==
The abbey is located in the townland of Glencairn in County Waterford. The townland, which is in electoral division of Castlerichard (the original name of part of the abbey complex), had a population of 59 people as of the 2011 census.

== History ==
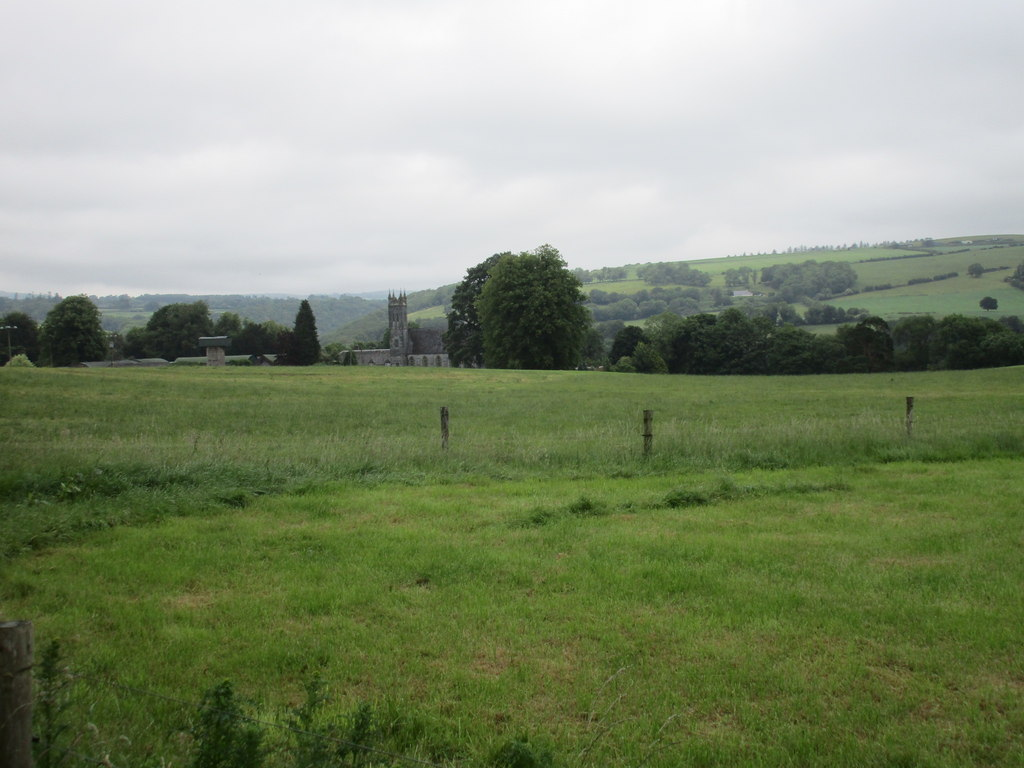
Glencairn Abbey is located in the Blackwater Valley

The original community of this monastic tradition had been welcomed to Ireland by St. Malachy in 1142. The monastery was founded in 1932 by nuns of Holy Cross Abbey—located at that time in Stapehill, Dorset, England—which itself had been founded in 1802 by a small group of refugee nuns from France, led by a nun who had been imprisoned in the Bastille during the French Revolution, and narrowly escaped being sent to the guillotine. The land for St Mary's Abbey had been bought for them by the Cistercian Mount Melleray Abbey. The monks from Mount Melleray used to operate the farm. The chapel at Glencairn was built in 1930.

This community was the first house of Cistercian nuns founded in Ireland since the Dissolution of the Monasteries by Henry VIII (1536–41). To date it remains the only Cistercian community of nuns in Ireland. It went on to found Mount Saint Mary's Abbey in Wrentham, Massachusetts, in 1949, the first community of Cistercian nuns in the United States; and St Justina's monastery, Abakaliki, Nigeria in 1982.

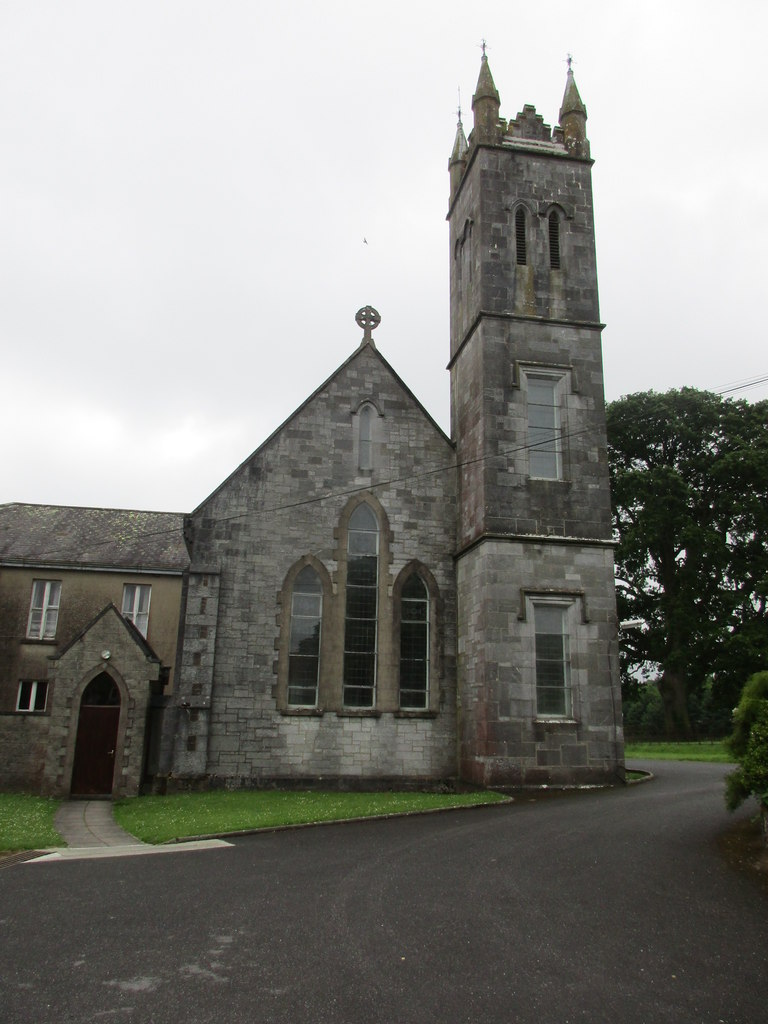
Chapel at Glencairn Abbey

In 2014 the abbey featured in the RTE Would you Believe documentary School of Love.

The community consists of 29 nuns, who support themselves in standard Cistercian practice through the farming of their 200-acre farm, the baking of altar breads and providing greeting and spiritual cards for all occasions, both printed and handcrafted.

== Abbesses ==
In 2019, Sr. Marie Fahey was re-elected abbess, for her fourth six-year term. Former abbesses and superiors include:

- Sr Maura Mary Perry — 1932–1935 (Superior); 1935–1935 (Abbess)
- Sr Gertrude Purcell — 1935–1944
- Sr Margaret Shaw — 1944–1950
- Sr Gertrude Purcell (2) — 1950–1955
- Sr Agnes Fahey — 1955–1958 (Sup. ad nutum)
- Sr Margaret Shaw (2) — 1958–1965
- Sr Imelda Power — 1965–1983
- Sr Dominic Lee — 1983–1995
- Sr Agnes O’Shea — 1995–2001
- Sr Marie Fahey OCSO — 2001–2025
- Sr Fiachra McNulty — 2025–present
