= Mary and Eve =

2005 drawing by Grace Remington

- Artist: Grace Remington
- Year: 2005
- Medium: Crayon, pencil

Mary and Eve is a 2005 crayon and pencil drawing depicting Mary, pregnant with Jesus, consoling Eve after the Fall. It is intended to symbolize the fulfillment of messianic prophecies begun in Genesis 3 and expresses a view of Mary as a New Eve. Drawn by Sister Grace Remington, a Cistercian nun in Iowa, the artwork has become a Christian devotional resource for Advent and has inspired poetry and music.

== Background ==
Grace Remington (b. 1971), a nun at Our Lady of the Mississippi Abbey near Dubuque, Iowa, said that she drew "the Ladies," her name for the women in the image, over a few days in 2005 while preparing to give a talk to her fellow nuns on Mary. "Since most of my upbringing was in the Protestant tradition, I didn't grow up with the same sense of relationship with Mary most of my sisters did, so I started by thinking about who Mary was to me," Remington told Plough. "As I pondered this, all sorts of other themes like redemption and grace, shame and compassion, the mystery of the Incarnation, and the promises of salvation came to my mind."

Remington said that she did not intend to share the picture beyond the abbey, but she was pleased with the result, and one of the sisters asked to use it for the abbey's Christmas card. Recipients began posting images of it online, and the abbey began selling prints and cards with the image. "It has been both surprising and touching to see how the image moves people," she said. "I don't feel a lot of personal responsibility for that. I am not a great drawer."

== Description ==
Eve and Mary are depicted together under an arch of pears against a yellow background. Eve, clothed only with her long hair, has downcast eyes. She holds an apple in one hand. A snake's body is coiled around her legs. Mary is heavily pregnant and dressed chastely in white and blue. Smiling, she caresses Eve's head with one hand, and with the other hand she presses Eve's free hand to her pregnant abdomen. Mary's foot is crushing the snake's head.

== Reception ==
Commentators praised the drawing for its simplicity and aesthetics. J. R. Briggs described the drawing as "simple yet theologically dazzling." Commentators also praised the way Remington illustrated the redemptive act of Jesus through women. Kathleen Gallagher Elkins describes Mary's appearance as "passive, peaceful, and accepting," in contrast to other portrayals like the Pietà that illuminate her suffering. Despite Eve's visible sorrow and the danger posed by the snake, "Mary shows no worry or pain."

=== Interpretation ===
Devotional commentators have observed that Mary is comforting Eve, who is filled with shame over her sin, drawing Eve's hand to her abdomen to touch the source of her future hope.

The drawing reflects Mary's status in Catholic theology as a second Eve who undoes Eve's sin with her acceptance of her role in the Incarnation. Anglican minister Hannah Craven rejected this typology expressed by the drawing as "wrongheaded," arguing that the Eve–Mary pairing is not biblically rooted and that it undermines Jesus's redemptive work. She argued that while the image might help women to "see themselves in the story of God," the Eve–Mary typology that animates the drawing obscures women's inclusion in Christ.

The snake symbolizes Satan and alludes to the statement in Genesis 3 that while the serpent would bite the heel of man, the seed of the woman would crush the serpent's head. The snake's continued grip on Eve's legs, even as its head is crushed, symbolizes the "already but not yet" conditions of sin and suffering between Jesus's ascension and his Second Coming.

Other elements of the drawing commented upon by observers include the garden setting, which symbolizes both Eden and Gethsemane as the places where man fell and was redeemed respectively, as well as the theme of fruit, with Eve holding the apple that symbolized her sin and touching the "fruit of the womb" of Mary.

== Cultural influence ==
Mary and Eve inspired the Advent song "Mary Consoles Eve", performed by Sandra McCracken and Rain for Roots. It has also inspired poetry on the subject.

== See also ==
- New Eve
