= New Eve =

Title of Mary, mother of Jesus

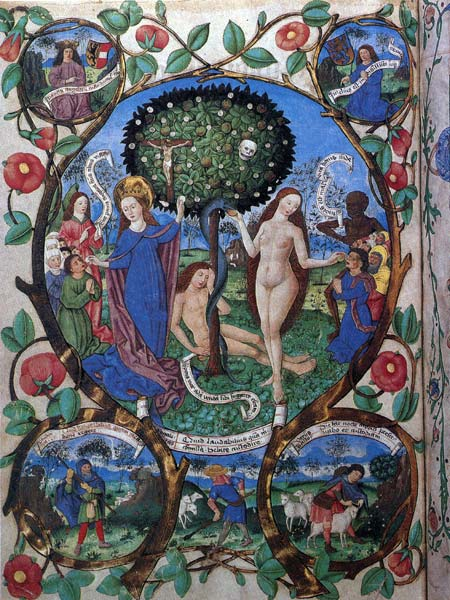
The tree of death and of life in the Salzburg Missal: Eve gives the representatives of the old covenant the fruit that brings sin and death from the tree of paradise. Mary, on the other hand, gives the faith hosts, the bread of life.

The New Eve (Latin: Nova Eva) is a devotional title for Mary, the mother of Jesus. Since the second century, numerous Eastern and Western Church Fathers have expressed this doctrinal idea of the new Eve as an analogy to the biblical concept of the New Adam in Jesus. The belief that Mary has a unique and necessary participation in the economy of salvation is expressed in the doctrine, particularly her faith at the annunciation of the archangel Gabriel, which facilitates the incarnation of Jesus Christ and human redemption.

== Early Church period ==
The Early Church Fathers looked to Paul's Letter to the Galatians 4:4-5: "But when the fullness of time had come, God sent his Son, born of a woman, born under the law, to ransom those under the law, so that we might receive adoption", and related this to the woman spoken of in the Protoevangelium of Genesis 3:15: "I will put enmity between you and the woman, and between your offspring and hers; They will strike at your head, while you strike at their heel." The church father Irenaeus of Lyons in his Against Heresies (5.21.1), followed by several other fathers of the church, interpreted the verse as a reference to Christ.

Justin Martyr was among the first to draw a parallel between Eve and Mary. This derives from his comparison of Adam and Jesus. In his Dialogue with Trypho, written sometime between 155–167, he explains:

He became man by the Virgin, in order that the disobedience which proceeded from the serpent might receive its destruction in the same manner in which it derived its origin. For Eve, who was a virgin and undefiled, having conceived the word of the serpent, brought forth disobedience and death. But the Virgin Mary received faith and joy, when the angel Gabriel announced the good tidings to her that the Spirit of the Lord would come upon her, and the power of the Highest would overshadow her: wherefore also the Holy Thing begotten of her is the Son of God; and she replied, 'Be it unto me according to thy word." And by her has He been born, to whom we have proved so many scriptures refer, and by whom God destroys both the serpent and those angels and men who are like him; but works deliverance from death to those who repent of their wickedness and believe upon Him.

Irenaeus, bishop of Lugdunum, also takes this up in Against Heresies, written about the year 182:

In accordance with this design, Mary the Virgin is found obedient, saying: 'Behold the handmaid of the Lord; be it unto me according to your word.' Luke 1:38 But Eve was disobedient, for she did not obey when as yet she was a virgin ... having become disobedient, was made the cause of death, both to herself and to the entire human race; so also did Mary, having a man betrothed [to her], and being nevertheless a virgin, by yielding obedience, become the cause of salvation, both to herself and the whole human race. And on this account does the law term a woman betrothed to a man, the wife of him who had betrothed her, although she was as yet a virgin; thus indicating the back-reference from Mary to Eve ... For the Lord, having been born 'the First-begotten of the dead', Revelation 1:5 and receiving into His bosom the ancient fathers, has regenerated them into the life of God, He having been made Himself the beginning of those that live, as Adam became the beginning of those who die. 1 Corinthians 15:20-22 Wherefore also Luke, commencing the genealogy with the Lord, carried it back to Adam, indicating that it was He who regenerated them into the Gospel of life, and not they Him. And thus also it was that the knot of Eve's disobedience was loosed by the obedience of Mary. For what the virgin Eve had bound fast through unbelief, this did the virgin Mary set free through faith.

Tertullian and Origen wrote about the Eve-Mary parallel as well. Given that Justin Martyr was possibly taught by pupils of the apostles, or at least by people of the apostolic age, and that the theme seems to have been a widespread basic teaching among early Christians, it is possible that it comes from the apostolic tradition rather than being Justin Martyr's creation, according to Serafim Seppälä.

== Medieval period ==
The early medieval period reflected an increased devotion to Mary after the Council of Ephesus which declared Mary Theotokos, which in the West was rendered "Mother of God". The rise of monasticism preserved the works of the early fathers. According to Luigi Gambero, sermons tended to follow a standard form: "... the sin of our first parents, the Eve-Mary parallel, the angel's annunciation to Mary and the incarnation of the son of God, the birth of Christ ..."

== Modern period ==
In the 1854 apostolic constitution, Ineffabilis Deus, promulgating the dogma of the Immaculate Conception, Pope Pius IX referred to the opinion of the Fathers:

Hence, to demonstrate the original innocence and sanctity of the Mother of God, not only did they frequently compare her to Eve while yet a virgin, while yet innocence, while yet incorrupt, while not yet deceived by the deadly snares of the most treacherous serpent; but they have also exalted her above Eve with a wonderful variety of expressions. Eve listened to the serpent with lamentable consequences; she fell from original innocence and became his slave. The most Blessed Virgin, on the contrary, ever increased her original gift, and not only never lent an ear to the serpent, but by divinely given power she utterly destroyed the force and dominion of the evil one.

In the 1974 Apostolic Exhortation Marialis Cultus, Pope Paul VI saw Mary as the second Eve standing alongside and subordinated to Christ, the second Adam. As the second Eve, she is the new woman, the definitive expression of what it is to be human. In Mary we see what God intends for his people as a whole. "She is given to us as a pledge and guarantee that God's plan in Christ has already been realized in a creature."

The Roman Breviary contains the Mass of the Blessed Virgin Mary, in which she is described as the new Eve: "Glorious are you, holy Mary, the new Eve. From you the new Adam, Christ Jesus, was born."

Alongside the theogical concept of Mary as Co-Redemptrix, Eve is seen to be co-peccatrix (co-sinner), because it was Eve who freely gave the "instrument" of The Fall of Man. It is Eve who gave the "forbidden fruit" to Adam, the peccator (sinner) whose sin as father of the human race led to the loss of grace for the human race.

Amphilochius of Iconium says: "... O Mary, O Mary, the Maker of all things was your firstborn Son! O humanity, who became the bodily substance of the Word and for that reason became more honorable than the spiritual virtues of heaven! For Christ did not want to clothe himself in the form of archangels or in the form of the immaterial figures of the principalities, virtues, and powers; rather, through you, he clothed himself in your form, which had fallen and become like that of the brute animals ... but where now is that hostile and bewildered dragon? Where is that cursed and execrable dragon, who had claimed that this throne would be raised to the heights of heaven?

Caelius Sedulius writes:

Because of one man, all his descendants perished;
And all are saved because of one man.
Because of one woman, the deadly door opened;
And life returned, because of one woman.

== See also ==
- New Adam
- Titles of Mary, mother of Jesus
- Mary and Eve
