= Santa Rita Abbey =

Trappistine Monastery in Sonoita, Arizona

Coordinates: 31°44′07.5″N 110°40′38.3″W

The Santa Rita Abbey is a monastic community of the Trappistine branch of Cistercian nuns located in Sonoita, Arizona, within the Diocese of Tucson.

== History ==
The monastery was founded by Mount Saint Mary's Abbey in Wrentham, Massachusetts in 1972, and erected as a priory in 1978.

The nuns of Santa Rita settled among the vast rolling grasslands of the Coronado National Forest just north of Sonoita, Arizona in the foothills of the Santa Rita mountains. Their work includes the production of altar breads, and sculpture. They also offer guest retreat facilities including 6 individual rooms and a small apartment for two people available for visitors who wish to share in the quiet beauty, simplicity, and solitude.

The Superior as of 2012 is Mother Victoria Murray, O.C.S.O.

== See also ==
- Trappists
- Cistercian nuns
