= María Vela y Cueto =

Spanish Cistercian nun (1561–1617)

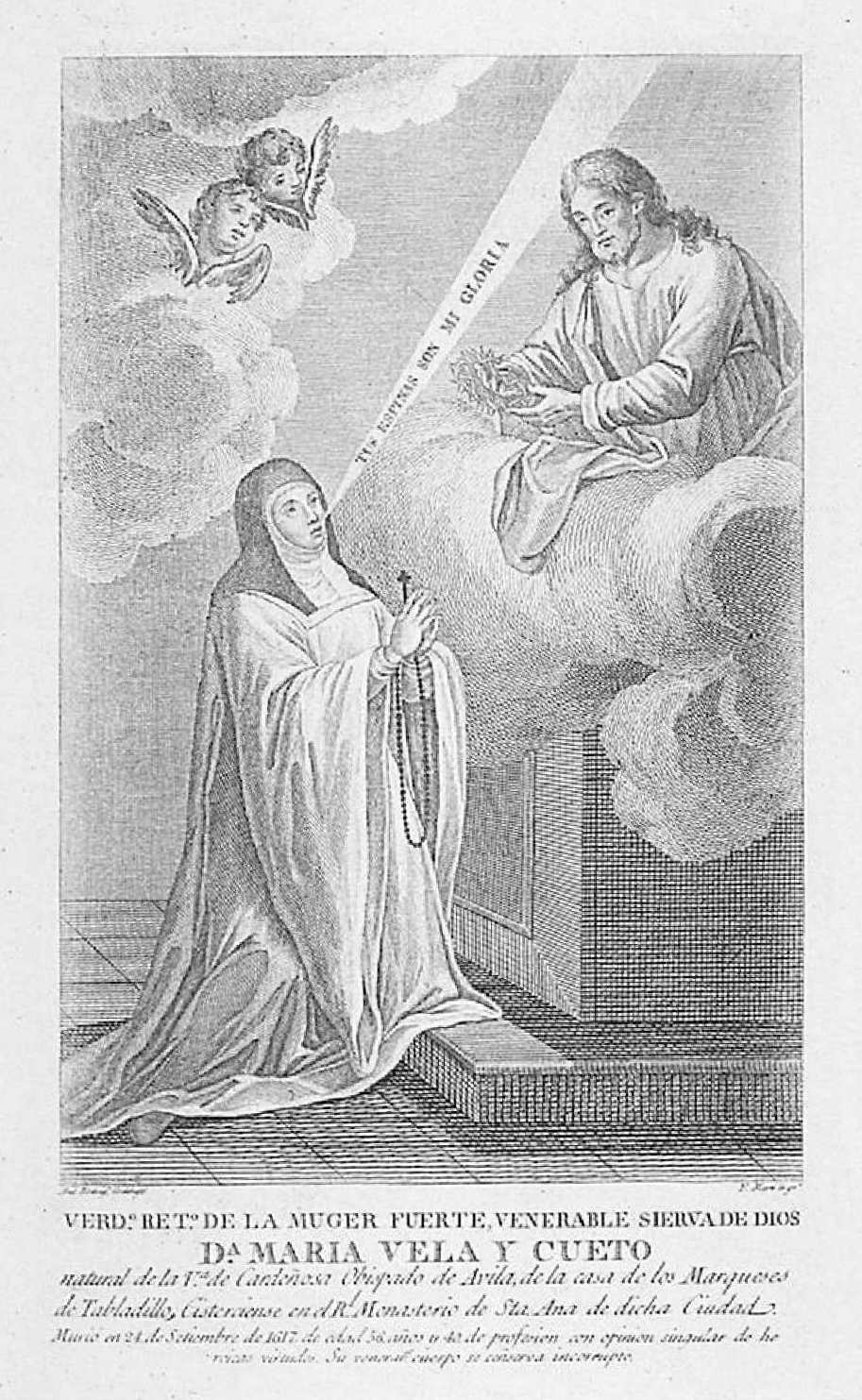
Portrait of María Vela y Cueto

María Vela y Cueto (1561–1617) was a Cistercian nun born in Cardeñosa, Spain and raised in Avila for most of her young life. She became mostly known for her spastic episodes of euphoria in which many of her congregation believed that she may have been under demonic possession.

== Early life ==
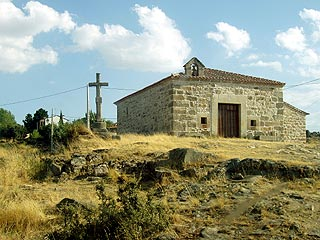
Cardeñosa, Spain

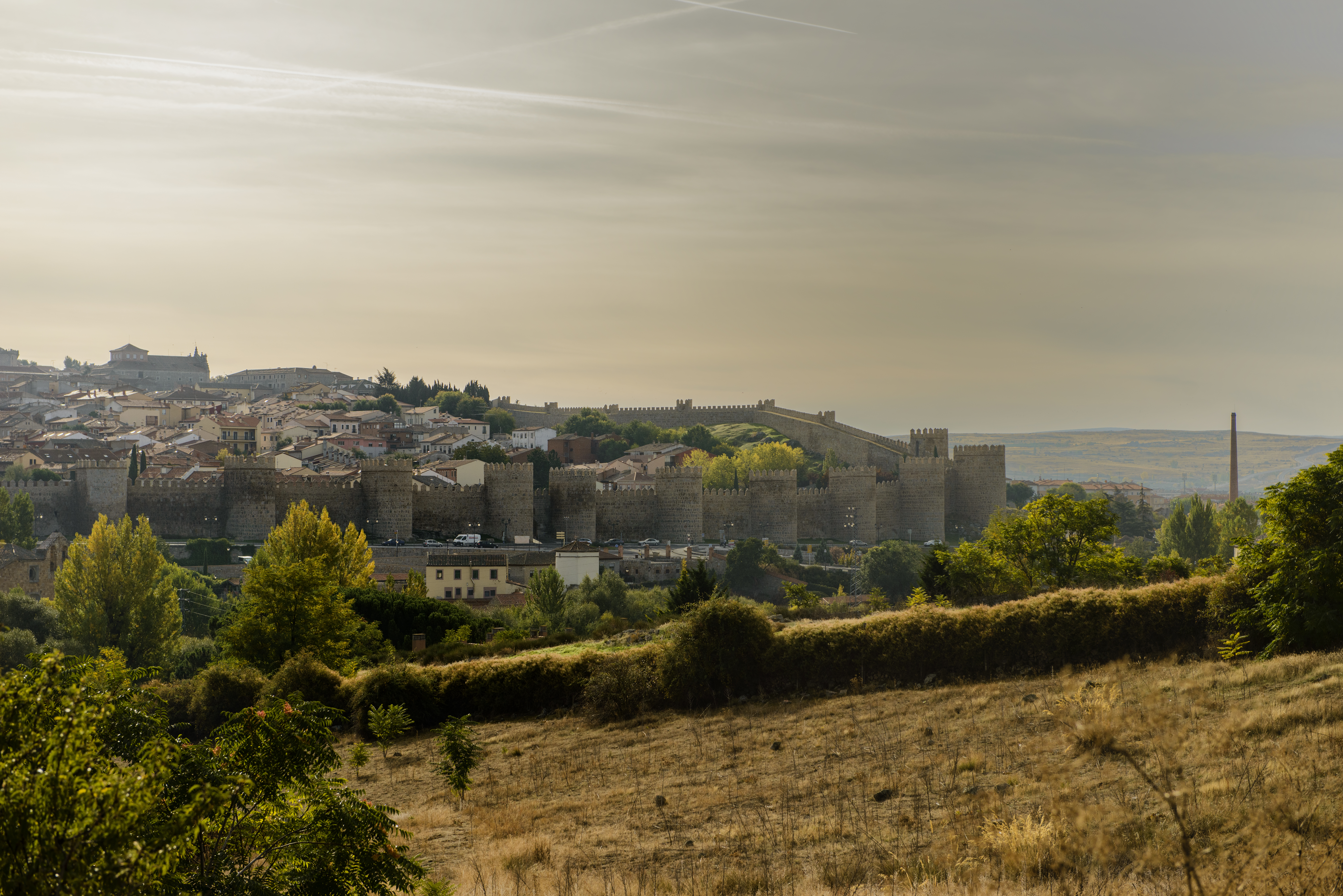
Avila, Spain

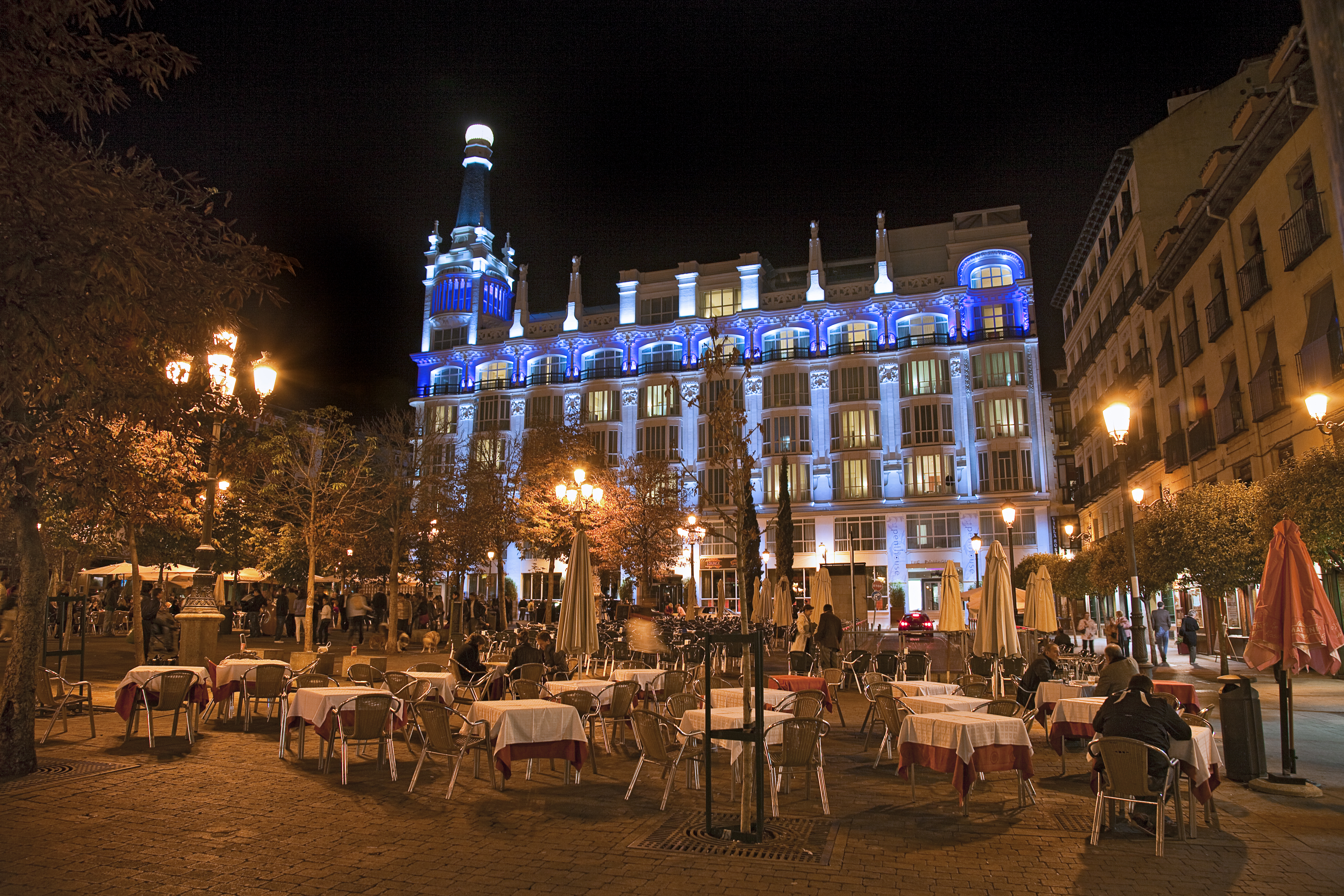
Santa Ana, Caceres

Vela y Cueto was born in Cardeñosa, Spain to parents Don Diego Alvarez y Cueto, and Doña Ana de Aguirre who were part of the Spanish Aristocracy. She was born into wealth on Easter Sunday in 1561, as the third child after her parents had conceived two older brothers; Diego and Lorenzo. After Vela y Cueto's birth, Don Diego and Doña Ana went on to conceive two more daughters; Jeronima and Isabel. It is said that "all but one, Diego, did not follow the ecclesiastical route". Both of Vela y Cueto's parents raised them in a strictly religious household which explains the careers paths that she and her siblings took. Although born in Cardeñosa, she was raised the majority of her young life in the nearby provincial capital of Avila, Spain. In 1570, tragedy would befall her and her family when her father Don Diego died, a year before Vela y Cueto's first communion which lead the family into a state of poverty. At fifteen Vela y Cueto decided to make the monastic life part of her permanent life as she entered into the Cistercian house of Santa Ana. She remained in the Cistercian house for forty years. However, her decision to devote her life to the Catholic church is rare since it was a custom for those days to have marriage as a first option, the church as a second option, and prostitution was the last chance to survive in a world that would frown upon anyone who chose this life.

== Convent life ==
"On February 2, 1576 [Vela y Cueto's sisters Jeronima and Isabel carried her into the Convent because she was] too frail to cross the threshold by foot" Vela y Cueto was said to have been a sickly person "ailing, to the age of fifty-six" however she outlived her youngest sister Isabel. She was determined to live a life of celibacy and was willing to wait for six years until she could finally take her vows. Both of her younger sisters took the same vow and became nuns in the same Cistercian house as María. During her stay in Santa Ana, María Vela y Cueto started experiencing signs that claimed to come from God. These experiences were deemed to be visions, hearing of celestial voices, trances, fits and bodily contortions that would make the other nuns and clergy members wonder if her mental capabilities had suffered from her constant state of sickness or if these experiences weren't from up above but caused by possession by a demon. Abbesses were alarmed at her outlandish nature and would control Vela y Cueto's behavior by forcing her to confess.

Through these "divinely inspired" fits she claimed that she "hears Christ lament that humanity has forgotten that he suffered for them, and so she suffers with him to renew the observance of the rule within her convent. The spectacle of her mortified flesh brings the image of Christ's passion before the eyes of her community, which responds with ridicule and scandal." The monastery was very disturbed by these claims that Vela y Cueto that "a sister who has made her profession but is so unhappy with everything in the convent that is not to her liking that she goes around crying like a two-year-old". Vela y Cueto found no solace among her monastic sisters and brother, in the end she turned to her real brothers, Lorenzo and Diego "who would tolerate no disparaging remarks about her, insisting that their sister was 'a saint' even when her fellow nuns in the convent challenged the sanctity that Maria's brothers associated with her extreme ascetism and visions. In 1603 Vela y Cueto crossed paths with Dr. Miguel Gonzalez Vaquero became her spiritual supervisor and sympathizer of sorts. Vaquero was a secular priest who was also raised in Avila and heard about the thrashing nun and decided to make it his personal goal to help Vela y Cueto make sense of her divine interventions. As time went on Vela y Cueto slowly found herself to be a respected member of the convent through her involvement with the novitiates the leading of worship through song while playing the organ.

== Death and legacy ==
On 17 September 1614, Vela y Cueto fell ill with pleurisy and pneumonia and died on 24 September of that same year. "[H]er body, writings, and reputation were all taken over by priestly guardians. Chief among them was Dr. Vaquero, the sympathetic confessor of her later years and author of the biography, La Mujer Fuerte, first published in 1618."

With her life and writings taken over by hagiographers, Doña Maria's body and clothes were soon sought after by relic-gatherers and, instead of being buried in a simple shroud and an insignificant grave as her sisters Jeronima and Isabel had been, her corpse was honoured in the grand ceremonial of a funeral which the Bishop of Avila organised and attended, before her burial in an imposing tomb."

== Bibliography ==
Bilinkoff, Jodi (2005). Related Lives. Cornell University: Cornell University Press. pp.66–67.

McKnight, Kathryn (1997). The Mystic of Tunja: The Writings of Madre Castillo, 1671-1742. University of Massachusetts Press. p. 156. ISBN 1-55849-074-4.

Miller and Yavneh, Naomi and Naomi (2006). Sibling Relations and Gender in the Early Modern World. Ashgate Publishing Limited.p. 5. ISBN 0-7546-4010-8

Rees, Margaret (2004) Dona Maria Vela y Cueto, Cistercian Mystic of Spain's Golden Age. The Edwin Mellen Press. pp. 6–7,11-13

Gabriele Lautenschläger (1997). "Maria Vela de Cueto". In Bautz, Traugott (ed.). Biographisch-Bibliographisches Kirchenlexikon (BBKL) (in German). Vol. 12. Herzberg: Bautz. cols. 1204–1205. ISBN 3-88309-068-9.
