= The gospel =

Religious message of salvation or thanks

The gospel or good news is a theological concept in several religions. In the historical Roman imperial cult and in Christianity, the gospel is a message about salvation by a divine figure, a savior, who has brought peace or other benefits to humankind.

In Ancient Greek religion, the term referred to a type of sacrifice or ritual offering made to thank the gods upon receiving good news.

The Roman imperial cult applied it to Augustus, who was hailed as a savior for ending war and ushering in the Pax Romana. The Calendar Inscription of Priene of 9 BCE/BC, which reset the year to begin on his birthday, is the best-known pre-Christian use of the concept. The Koine Greek word euangélion originally referred to the reward given to a messenger who brought good news and, in the plural, to offerings made to the gods in gratitude for such news. The English word gospel derives from Old English gōdspel, meaning "good news", while the related term evangelium entered the tradition through the Vulgate.

It is a central message of Christianity today, in which written accounts of the life and teaching of Jesus Christ are known as Gospels. Paul the Apostle summarised it as the death, burial and resurrection of Jesus "according to the Scriptures", a formula preserved in 1 Corinthians 15 and among the earliest creeds. Christian theology treats the message as foretold in the Old Testament rather than new, reading Genesis 3:15 as a "Proto-Gospel". Emphases differ across movements: the missions movement holds the message to be addressed to every nation, while liberation theology stresses the liberation of the poor and oppressed.

The concept is also significant in Islam, where it is referred to as the Injīl (Arabic: الإنجيل), a revelation given to Isa (Jesus). Islamic theology counts it among the revealed scriptures alongside the Tawrat, Zabur and Qur'an.

== Etymology ==
Gospel (/ˈɡɒspəl/) is the Old English translation of the Koine Greek term εὐαγγέλιον, meaning "good news"; this may be analyzed as euangélion (εὖ, eû, '"good"' + ἄγγελος, ángelos, '"messenger"' + -ιον, -ion diminutive suffix). The Greek term was Latinized as evangelium in the Vulgate, and translated into Latin as bona annuntiatio. In Greek, the term originally referred to a reward or gratuity paid to a courier for bringing good news. It later came to designate the message of good news itself, and also a religious offering of thanks for good fortune.

In Old English, it was rendered as gōdspel (gōd, "good, beneficial, favorable" + spel, "news"). The Old English term continued to be used in Middle English Bible translations and survives in Modern English as gospel. The Greek term is preserved in English words such as evangelist and evangelical.

In Islam, the Arabic term Injīl (الإنجيل) is derived from the Syriac awongelion (ܐܘܢܓܠܝܘܢ), which itself originates from the same Greek word. The Quran mentions the Injīl (or Injeel) as divine scripture revealed to ʿĪsā (Jesus), regarded by Muslims as one of the four major revealed holy books, alongside the Torah, Zabur, and Quran.

== In Greek and Roman religion ==
=== Ancient Greece ===
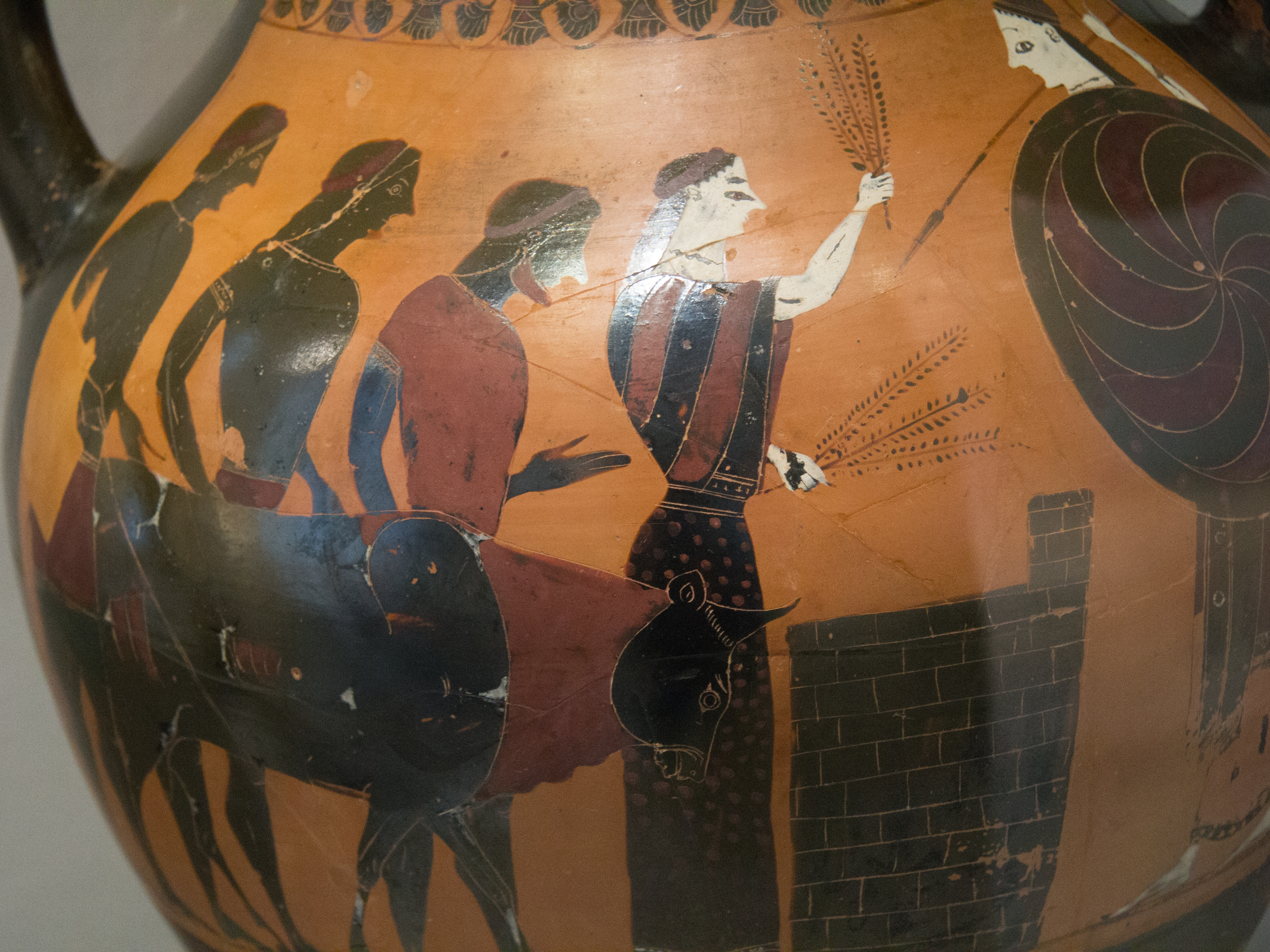
A bull being taken to an altar of the goddess Athena

In Ancient Greek religion the word εὐαγγέλια means a sacrifice offered for good tidings or good news. Like other Greek religious thanks-offerings, offerings took the form of animal sacrifice, offerings of food and drink, and ritual dedications. News of military victory was frequently celebrated with an offering. In the play The Knights by Aristophanes of 424 BCE, the comic character Paphlagon proposes an excessive sacrifice of a hundred heifers to Athena to celebrate good news. This word in Greek has a double meaning: the singular form means a reward paid to a human messenger who brings good news, and the plural form means a thanks-offering to the gods for good news.

=== Rome ===
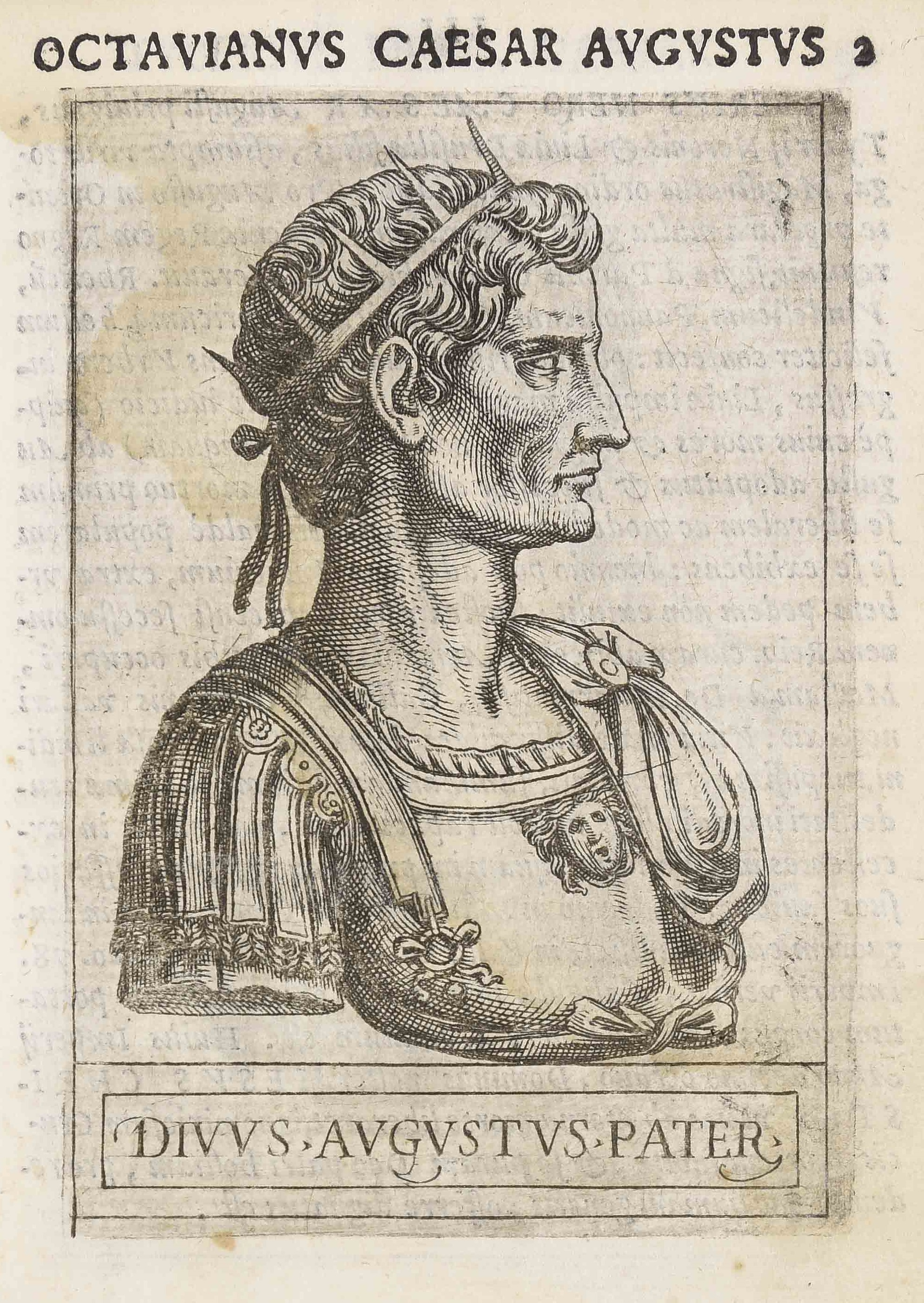
Octavian as the August Divine Father, the savior in ancient Roman gospel

The Roman Imperial cult celebrated the gospel of the August One or Divus Augustus, a mythologized version of the first Roman emperor Octavian, also known as Augustus Caesar. Augustus was both a man and a god, "a savior who has made war to cease and who shall put everything in peaceful order." This period of peace is called the Pax Romana. To celebrate the good tidings of peace with an unusually grand gospel offering, governor Paullus Fabius Maximus suggested the ritual dedication of the calendar to Augustus, starting the new year on Augustus's birthday. This dedication to the August One served to synchronize diverse local calendars across the Empire, and is the origin of the name of the month August. The idea of dedication to a divine king's birthday later formed the basis of the Julian and Gregorian calendars.

One implementation of this gospel calendar dedication is recorded in the Calendar Inscription of Priene. In it, the Koine Greek word for "good news" appears in celebrating the birth of the god and savior Augustus, sent by Providence to bring peace. It announces the intention of the city of Priene to change their calendar so that it begins on the birthday of Augustus, the first day of the good news. The Priene inscription is the most famous pre-Christian use of the concept of the gospel. Dated to 9 BCE, a few years before the birth of Jesus, the inscription demonstrates that the gospel was used as a political term before it was applied to Christianity.

== In the Bible and Christianity ==
=== Hebrew scripture ===
The ancient Hebrew noun בְּשׂוֹרָה (besorah) appears to carry the same double meaning as the equivalent Greek word for gospel, used for both a messenger delivering good news and a thanks-offering to a god upon receiving good news. The noun and verb forms are used several times in the Hebrew Bible.

==== Christian interpretation ====
Christian theology describes the good news of salvation in Jesus Christ not as a new concept, but one that has been foretold throughout the Hebrew scripture (known as the Old Testament in Christian Bibles) and was prophetically preached even at the time of the fall of man as contained in Genesis 3:14–15, which has been called the "Proto-Evangelion" or "Proto-Gospel". (Note: "Messianic prophecy has its origin in Genesis 3:15, which has been called the "protevangelium," the first Gospel promise. It was spoken by the LORD God (יְהוָה אֱלֹהִם) to the Serpent, used by Satan, in the hearing of Adam and Eve.") (Note: "After the Fall of man (Gen. 3) and its dire results, the loss of Paradise (3:23f.), death by sin (3:3; Rom. 5:12), and the cursing of the ground (3:17), preceded by the Protevangelium (3:15), the first revelation of the missio Dei, the Scriptures continue with the generations of Adam and the names of all the patriarchs from Adam to Noah...")

=== New Testament ===
==== The Gospels ====
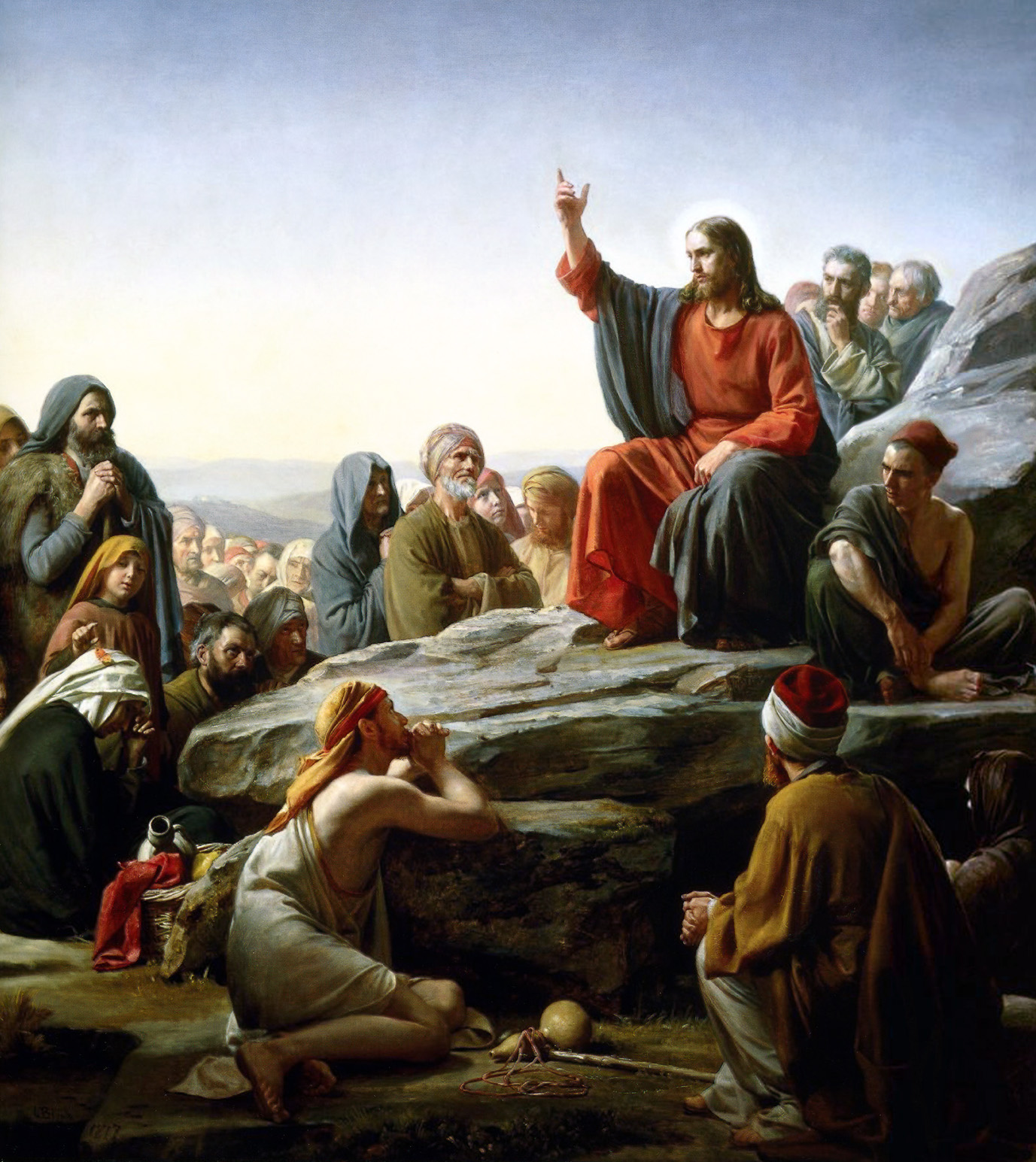
Carl Bloch's depiction of the Sermon on the Mount in which Jesus commented on the Jewish Law

A genre of ancient biographies of Jesus took on the name Gospel because they tell good news of Jesus as the Christian savior, bringing peace and acting as a sacrifice who has redeemed humankind from sin. The first four books of the Christian New Testament are the canonical gospels: Matthew, Mark, Luke, and John. In addition, a number of non-canonical gospels exist or existed but are not officially included in the Christian Bible.

==== In the Pauline epistles ====
Paul the Apostle gave the following summary, one of the earliest Christian Creeds, (translated into English) of this good news (gospel) in the First Epistle to the Corinthians:

Now I make known to you, brothers and sisters, the gospel which I preached to you, which you also received, in which you also stand, by which you also are saved, if you hold firmly to the word which I preached to you, unless you believed in vain. For I handed down to you as of first importance what I also received, that Christ died for our sins according to the Scriptures, and that He was buried, and that He was raised on the third day according to the Scriptures

— 1 Corinthians 15:1–4

Paul describes the gospel as being powerful and salvific:

For I am not ashamed of the gospel, because it is the power of God that brings salvation to everyone who believes: first to the Jew, then to the Gentile. Romans 1:16

==== In Acts ====
The good news can be summarized in many ways, reflecting various emphases. C. H. Dodd has summarized the Christian good news as taught by the apostle Peter in the Acts of the Apostles:

- The age of fulfilment has dawned;
- This has taken place through the ministry, death, and resurrection of Jesus;
- By virtue of the resurrection, Jesus has been exalted at the right hand of God as messianic head of the new Israel;
- The Holy Spirit in the Church is the sign of Christ's present power and glory;
- The Messianic Age will shortly reach its consummation in the return of Christ.

=== In various Christian movements ===
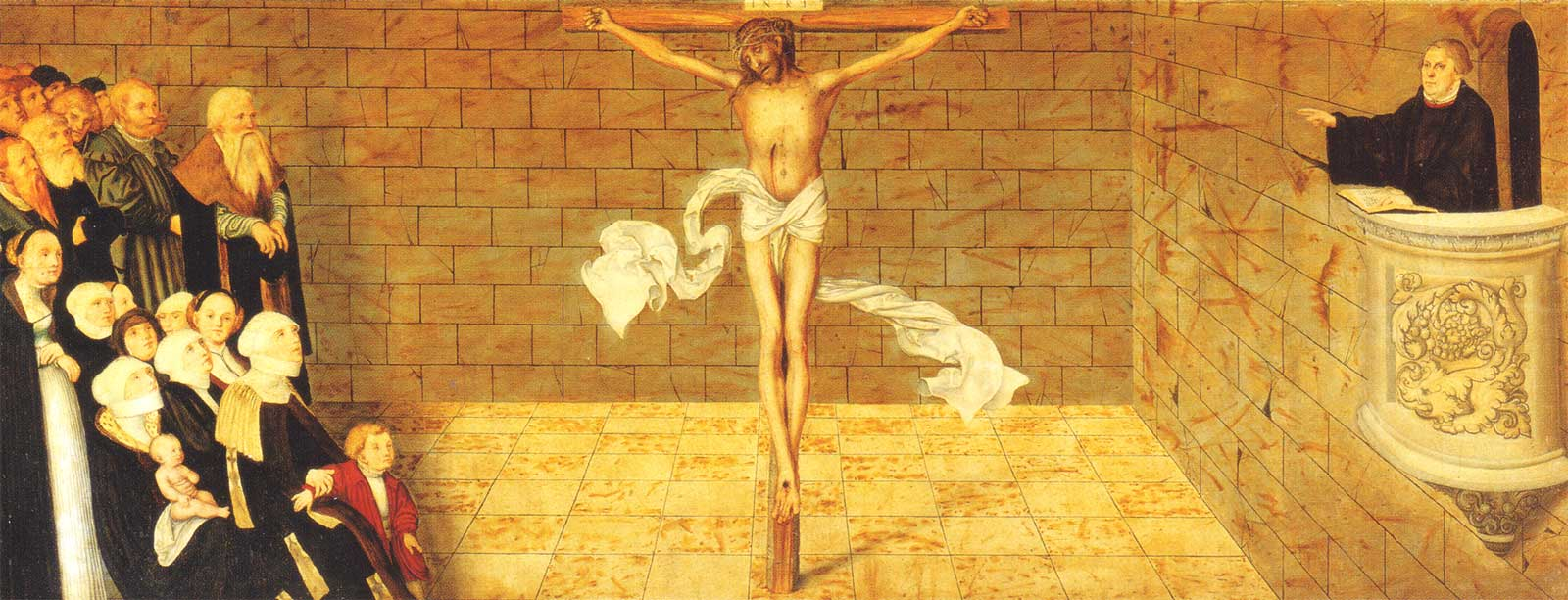
"The certain mark by which a Christian community can be recognized is the preaching of the gospel in its purity."—Martin Luther

The good news is described in many different ways in the Bible. Each one reflects different emphases, and describes part or all of the biblical narrative. Christian teaching of the good news—including the preaching of the Apostles in the Book of Acts—generally focuses upon the resurrection of Jesus and its implications. Sometimes in the Bible, the good news is described in other terms, but it still describes God's saving acts. For example, the Apostle Paul taught that the good news was announced to the patriarch Abraham in the words, "All nations will be blessed through you." (Galatians 3:6–9; c.f. Genesis 12:1–3).

==== Liberation theology ====
Liberation theology, articulated in the teachings of Latin American Catholic theologians Leonardo Boff and Gustavo Gutiérrez, emphasizes that Jesus came not only to save humanity, but also to liberate the poor and oppressed. A similar movement among the Latin American evangelical movement is the integral mission, in which the Church is seen as an agent for positively transforming the wider world, in response to the good news.

=== Christian mission ===
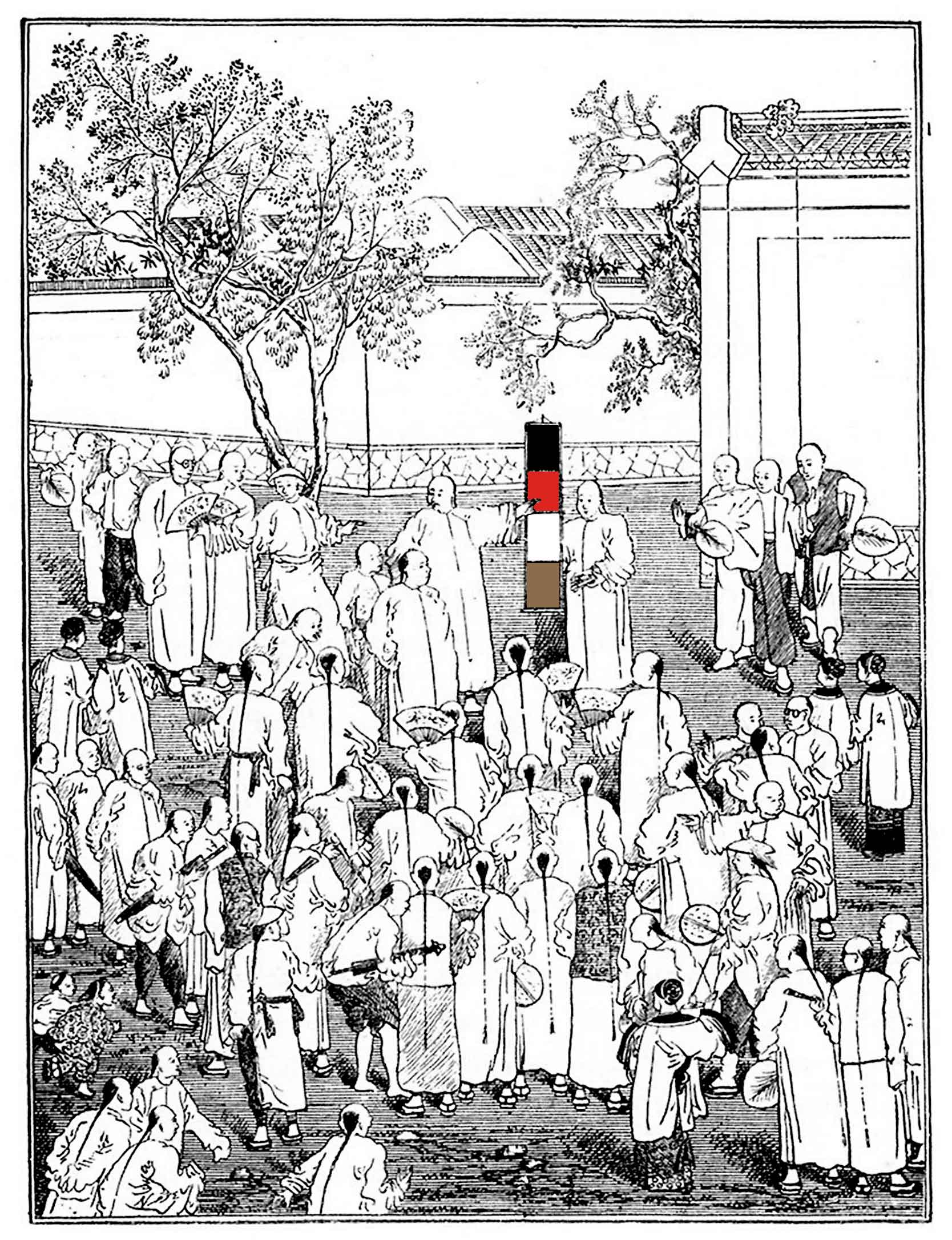
Missionary preaching in China using The Wordless Book

The Christian missions movement believes the Christian good news to be a message for all peoples, of all nations, tribes, cultures and languages. This movement teaches that it is through the good news of Jesus that the nations of humanity are restored to relationship with God and that the destiny of the nations is related to this process. Missiology professor Howard A. Snyder writes, "God has chosen to place the Church with Christ at the very center of His plan to reconcile the world to himself".

Another perspective described in the Pauline epistles is that it is through the good news of Jesus' death and resurrection, and the resulting worship of people from all nations, that evil is defeated on a cosmic scale. Reflecting on the third chapter of Ephesians 3, theologian Howard A. Snyder writes:

God's plan for the church extends to the fullest extent of the cosmos. By God's 'manifold wisdom' the Church displays an early fullness of what Christ will accomplish at the conclusion of all the ages. The spectacle is to reach beyond the range of humanity, even to the angelic realms. The church is to be God's display of Christ's reconciling love.

== In the Qur'an and Islam ==
=== In the Qur'an ===
The Quran refers to the Arabic term Injīl (Arabic: الإنجيل, romanized: Injīl, lit. 'good news') as a revelation given to ʿĪsā (Jesus). The Injīl is described in the Qur'an as containing "guidance and light" and as confirming the previous revelation of the Tawrat (Torah).^{[Quran 5:46]}^{[Quran 3:3]} Although al-injil is customarily translated as 'good news' or 'the gospel', Nicolai Sinai argues that the Quranic Injil more likely refers to a unitary Christian scriptural canon, believed to have been given to Isa as a divinely mandated re-edition of the Torah and available in the Quran's time.

The Qur'an also instructs the "People of the Gospel" to judge by what God revealed therein (^{[Quran 5:47]}) and describes the Qur'an as a guardian over previous scriptures (^{[Quran 5:48]}). According to Ilka Lindstedt of the University of Helsinki, nowhere is the corruption of the Jewish or Christian scriptures stated in the Qu'ran, but only its misinterpretation. Mehdy Shaddel writes that the Qur'an is 'decidedly non-supercessionist. In none of the proclamations addressed to Jews and Christians in the text does it assert that their belief systems, scriptures, or way of life are misguided or have been abrogated.'; the Quran confirms what the Jews and Christians already possess (Q 2:89), and it confirms the continued relevance of the Torah and Gospel held by Jews and Christians of the time as a binding source of law.

=== Islamic interpretation ===
In Islamic theology the Injīl is regarded as one of the revealed scriptures (alongside the Tawrat, Zabur and the Qur'an). Although both the Qur'an and its earliest interpreters assume that the Biblical text is broadly authentic, teachings about its corruption appeared later in history. Current Sunni and Shia doctrine affirm that the original Injīl was a genuine revelation to Jesus, but they generally maintain that the original Injīl has not survived in an unaltered form (a position often expressed by the Arabic term taḥrīf — "alteration" or "corruption").

Classical exegetes and many modern Muslim writers discuss two broadly held views: (1) the Injīl was at least partly recorded by Jesus's followers but later subject to editorial change, and (2) the revelation to Jesus was primarily oral and later reflected in various Christian writings. Both approaches appear across Sunni and Shia tafsīr literature and are discussed in modern scholarship.

=== Early Islamic literature and hadith ===
Early Islamic historiographical sources (for example the sīra and chronicles such as al-Ṭabarī) record interactions between Muslims and Christian communities (e.g., the Christians of Najrān), including letters, treaties and debates in which the Gospel and other scriptures are discussed.

Some hadith collections contain narrations referencing the People of the Book or earlier scriptures; because the authentication and interpretive weight of such hadiths vary, modern surveys and encyclopedias generally rely primarily on the Qur'an and authoritative tafsīr when summarizing Islamic doctrine about the Injīl, and treat hadith evidence cautiously and contextually.

=== Interfaith and missionary (daʿwah) context ===
The Injīl is an important topic in Muslim–Christian dialogue and in Muslim missionary discourse. Qur'anic injunctions addressed to the People of the Book (for example ^{[Quran 5:47]}) and verses that both affirm and reinterpret earlier revelation (for example ^{[Quran 5:48]}) are frequently cited in theological exchanges. Contemporary scholars and interfaith practitioners commonly treat the Injīl as a primary point of comparison in discussions on revelation, textual history, and scriptural authority.

== See also ==
- Evangelism

== Footnotes ==
=== Sources ===
- Woodhead, Linda (2004). Christianity: A Very Short Introduction. Oxford University Press. ISBN 978-0199687749.
