= Our Lady of the Mississippi Abbey =

Trappistine monastery in Dubuque, Iowa

Abbey of Our Lady of the Mississippi
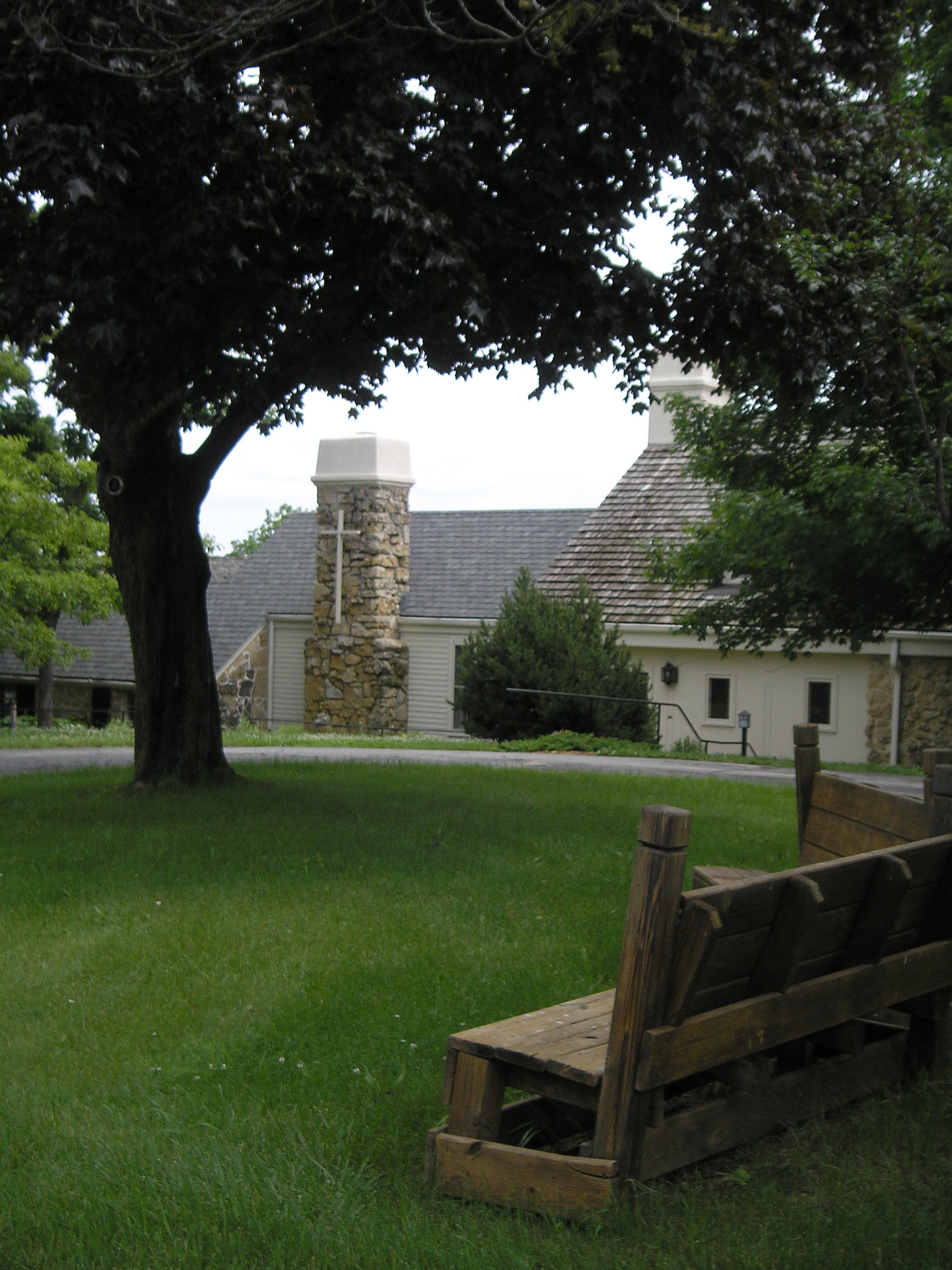
- A view of the abbey church from a quiet resting area just outside
- Interactive map of Abbey of Our Lady of the Mississippi

Monastery information
- Order: Order of Cistercians of the Strict Observance
- Established: 18 October 1964
- Mother house: Mount Saint Mary's Abbey; Wrentham, Massachusetts
- Dedication: Our Lady
- Diocese: Archdiocese of Dubuque

People
- Abbot: Mother Rebecca Stramoski, O.C.S.O., Abbess

Site
- Location: Dubuque, Iowa; United States of America
- Coordinates: 42.416°N 90.595°W

The Abbey of Our Lady of the Mississippi is located near Dubuque, Iowa. The nuns there are members of the branch of the Order of Cistercians of the Strict Observance, commonly referred to as Trappistines. They are a part of the Catholic Church in the Archdiocese of Dubuque.

== History ==
In 1960, the Trappistine nuns of Mount Saint Mary's Abbey in Wrentham, Massachusetts had decided that they had exceeded the capacity of their monastery, due to the great number of religious vocations of that era. They therefore decided it was time to make a new foundation.

The original site was to be in Argentina, where there was already a new monastery founded by the monks of the Trappist abbey near to Wrentham. That site did not work out, however, so the abbess, Mother Angela, O.C.S.O., asked the Trappists abbots of the United States for possible sites. The abbot of New Melleray Abbey offered to assume responsibility for such a foundation.

After a period of searching for a suitable location, and the generous donation of a benefactor, in July 1964 the "Hickory Hill" estate, south of Dubuque, became available and was recommended as a suitable site. The abbey was founded in 1964 when the first thirteen nuns left in to settle on the present site of the abbey, under the leadership of Mother Columba Guare, O.C.S.O. The nuns began making candy soon after, as a source of income, but they also attempted to support the monastery through farming, growing Christmas trees, and raising livestock.

The monastery was declared an autonomous community and raised to the status of abbey on 3 May 1968. Two years later, on 7 May, Mother Columba was elected as the first abbess of the community. She continued to lead the community until 1982. She was succeeded by Mother Gail Fitzpatrick, who served as abbess until 2006 when Mother Nettie Louise Gamble, O.C.S.O. was elected. Mother Rebecca Stramoski was elected abbess in 2012 and was re-elected in 2018 for a second six-year term.

== Today ==
Currently the abbey is home to about 20 nuns, who, as required by the Rule of St Benedict, spend their days in a balance between choral and private prayer, lectio divina (meditative reading of Scripture and other spiritual books) and manual labor. The Abbey supports itself primarily with candy making, but also farms the land it owns on the bluffs of the Mississippi River. Visitors are welcome to make a retreat and stay in any of several guesthouses on the property but these are often booked months in advance.

The nuns have a daily routine that involves spending a large part of their day in prayer, work, and contemplation. Each day begins with the Office of Vigil at 3:45 a.m.. Compline, the last prayer of the Liturgy of the Hours, is at 7:15 p.m. The Abbey is well known for candy, Trappistine Creamy Caramels. From September through December the Sisters make over a ton of caramels each week and ship them worldwide. The nuns operate an onsite gift shop stocked with candy from their factory as well as various religious gifts, including prints of Mary and Eve, drawn in 2005 by Sister Grace Remington.

== Expansion ==
In 1999, the nuns of the abbey decided to begin a daughter foundation, Tautra Abbey, in Tautra, Norway, and five nuns of Mississippi Abbey and two Norwegian nuns from other monasteries arrived there. In March 2006, Tautra Mariakloster became an autonomous priory.

== Gallery ==
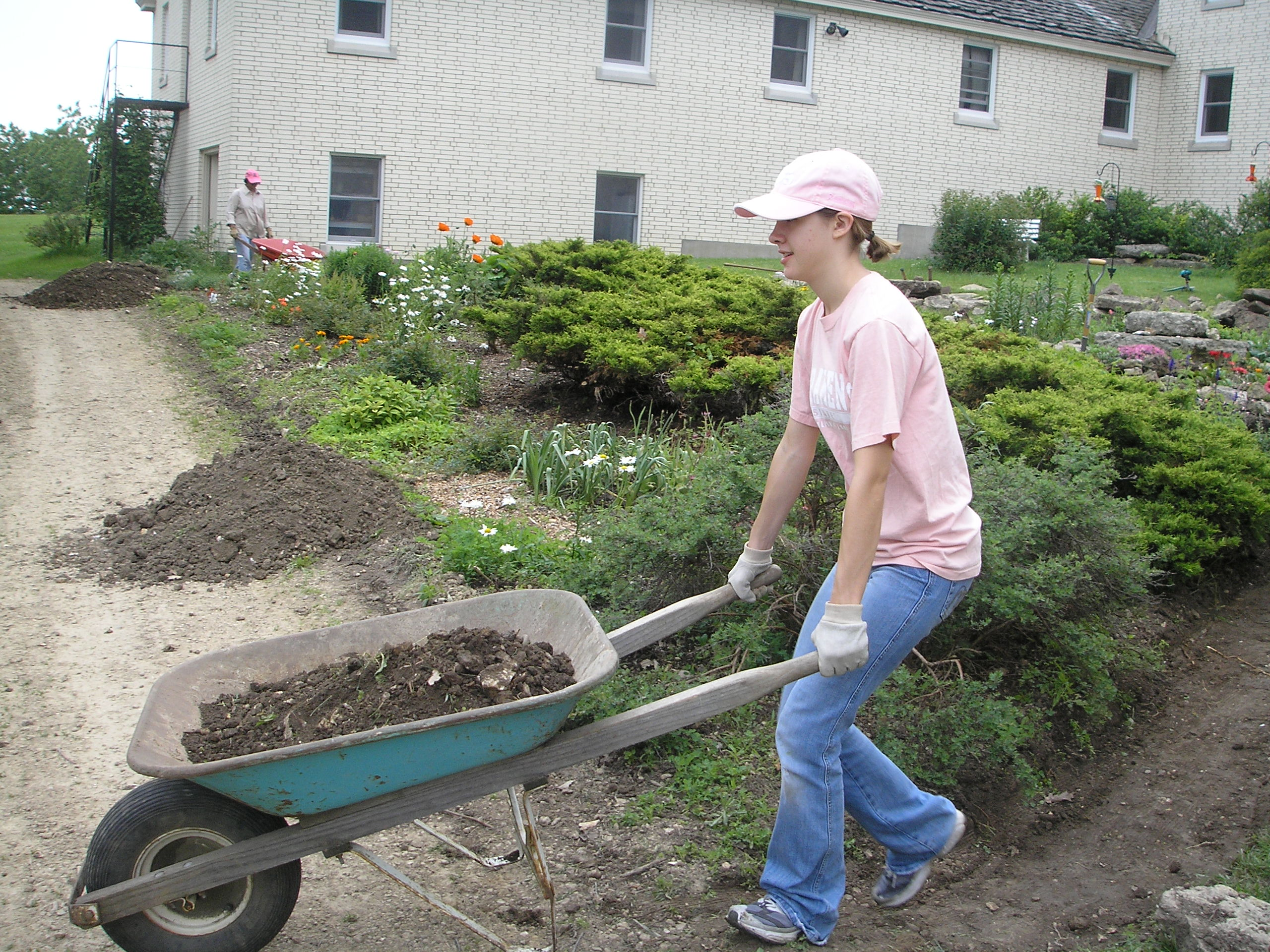
A young guest helps out in the abbey garden

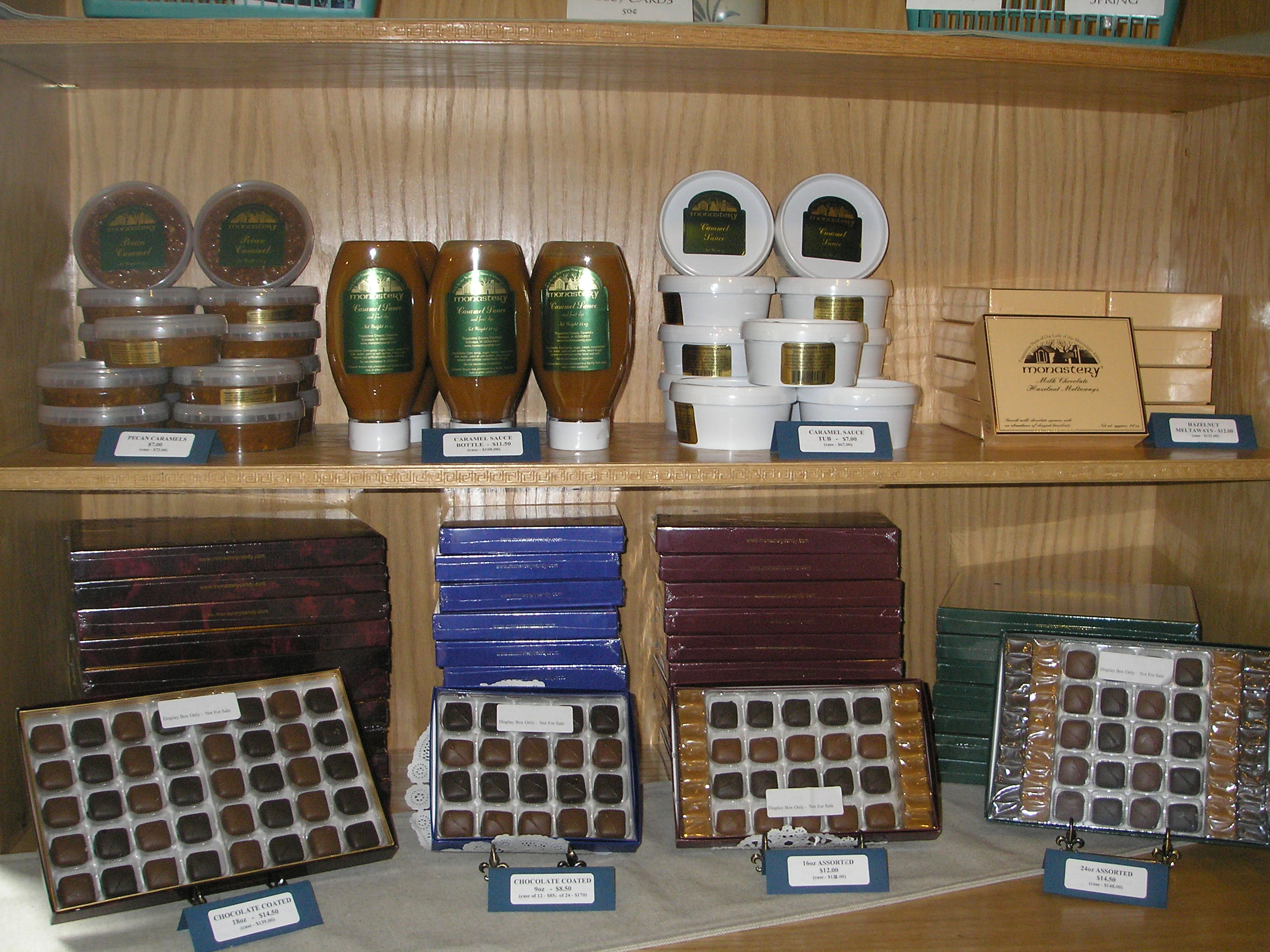
Candy made by the nuns at the abbey

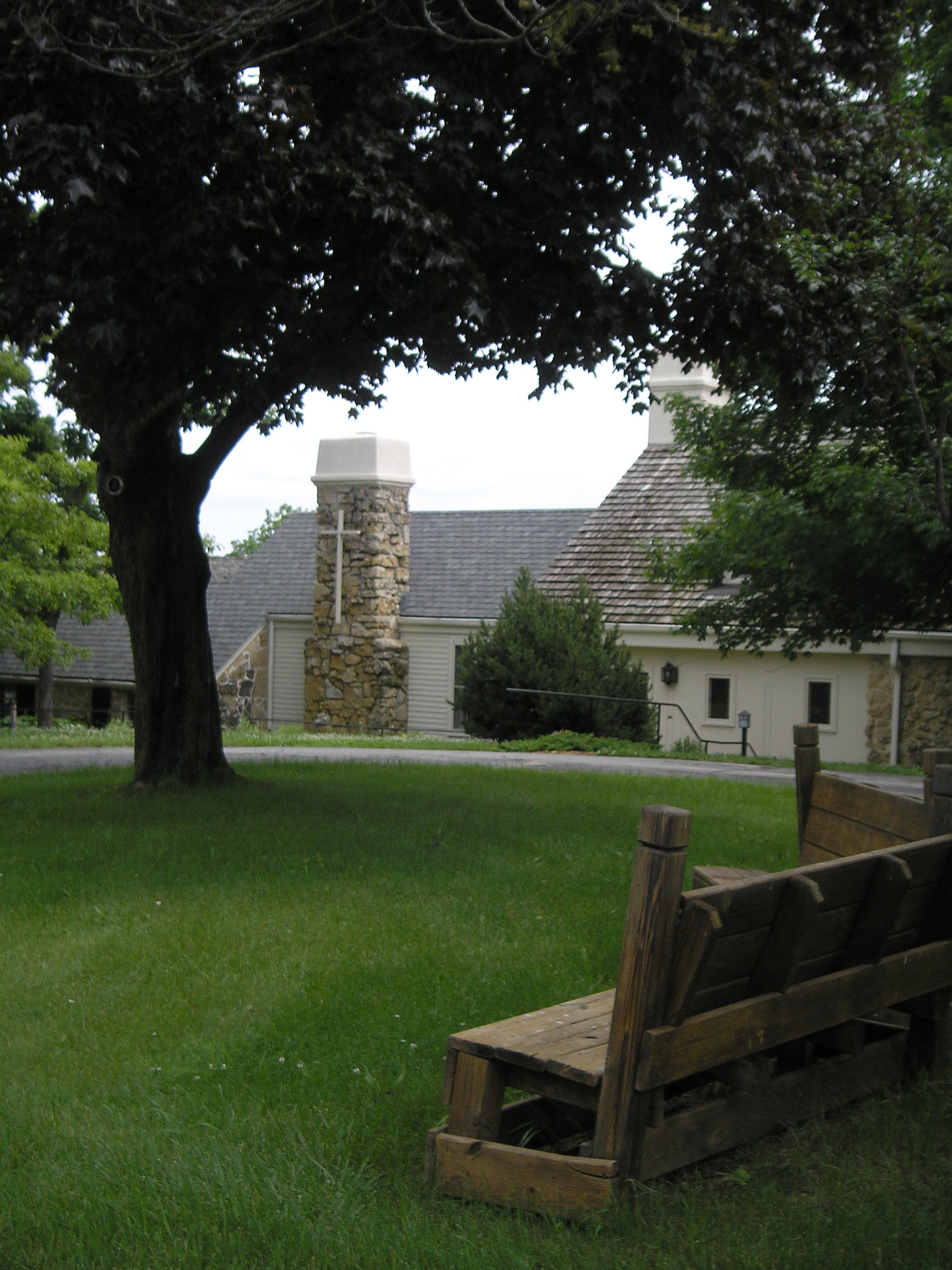
Resting area on the abbey lawn

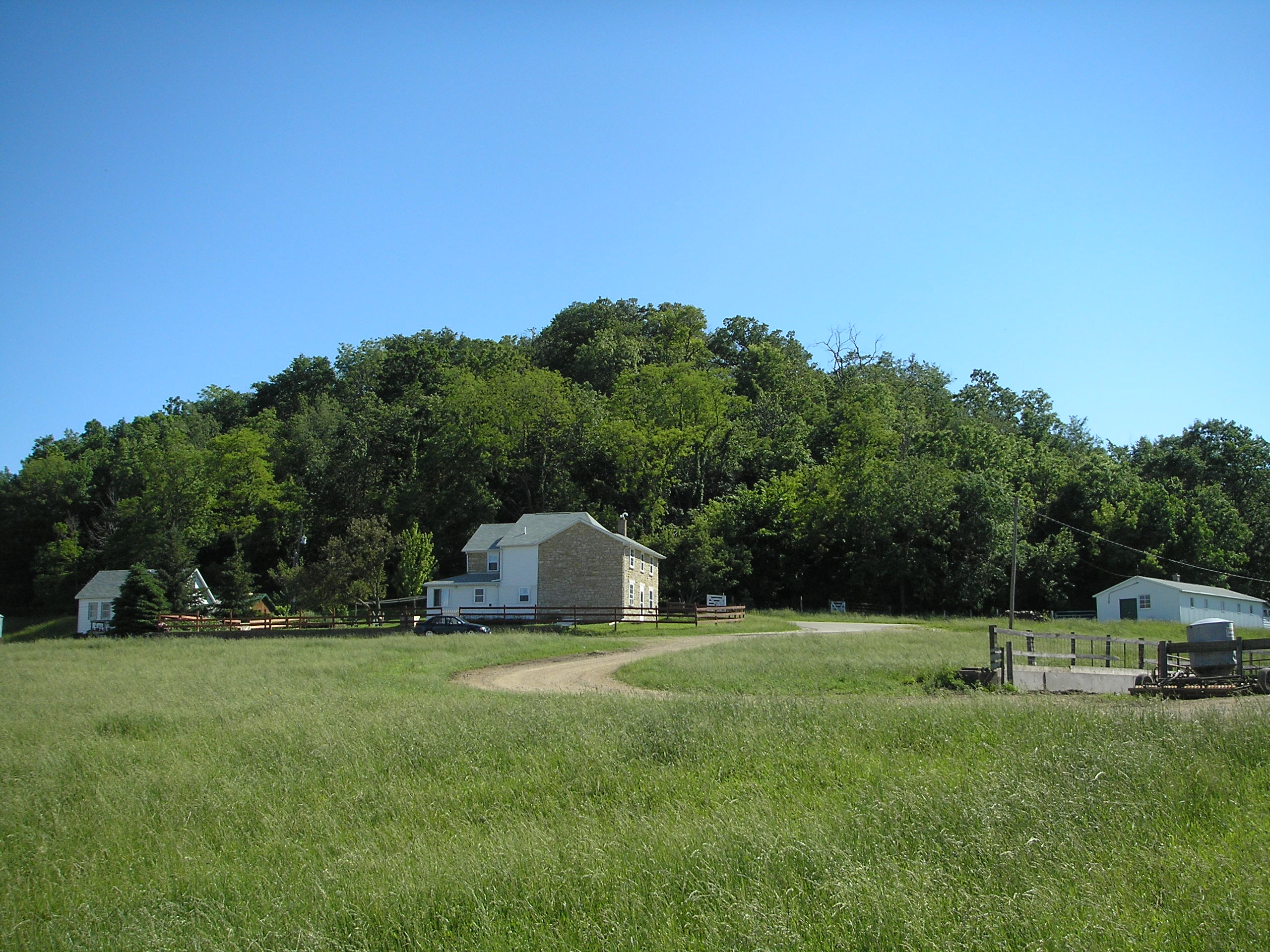
The nuns generate their own income from their candy making, a farm and retreat house.

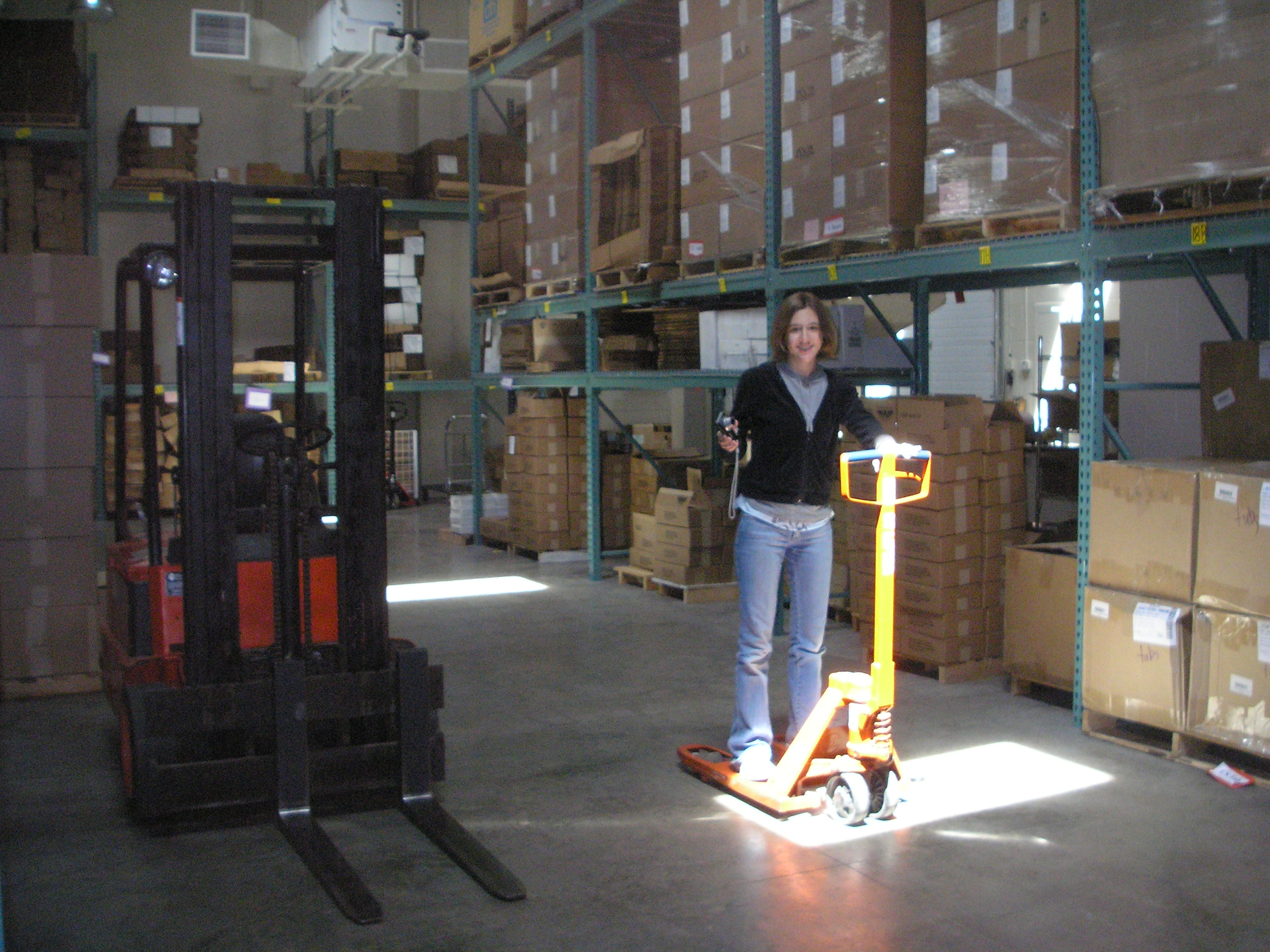
The candy warehouse at the abbey

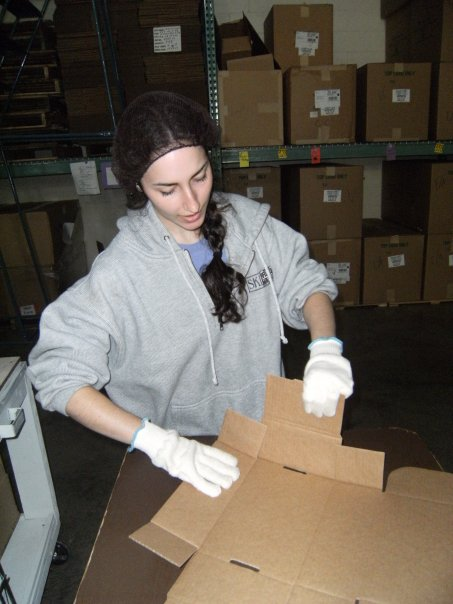
A guest helps out in the candy warehouse at the abbey.

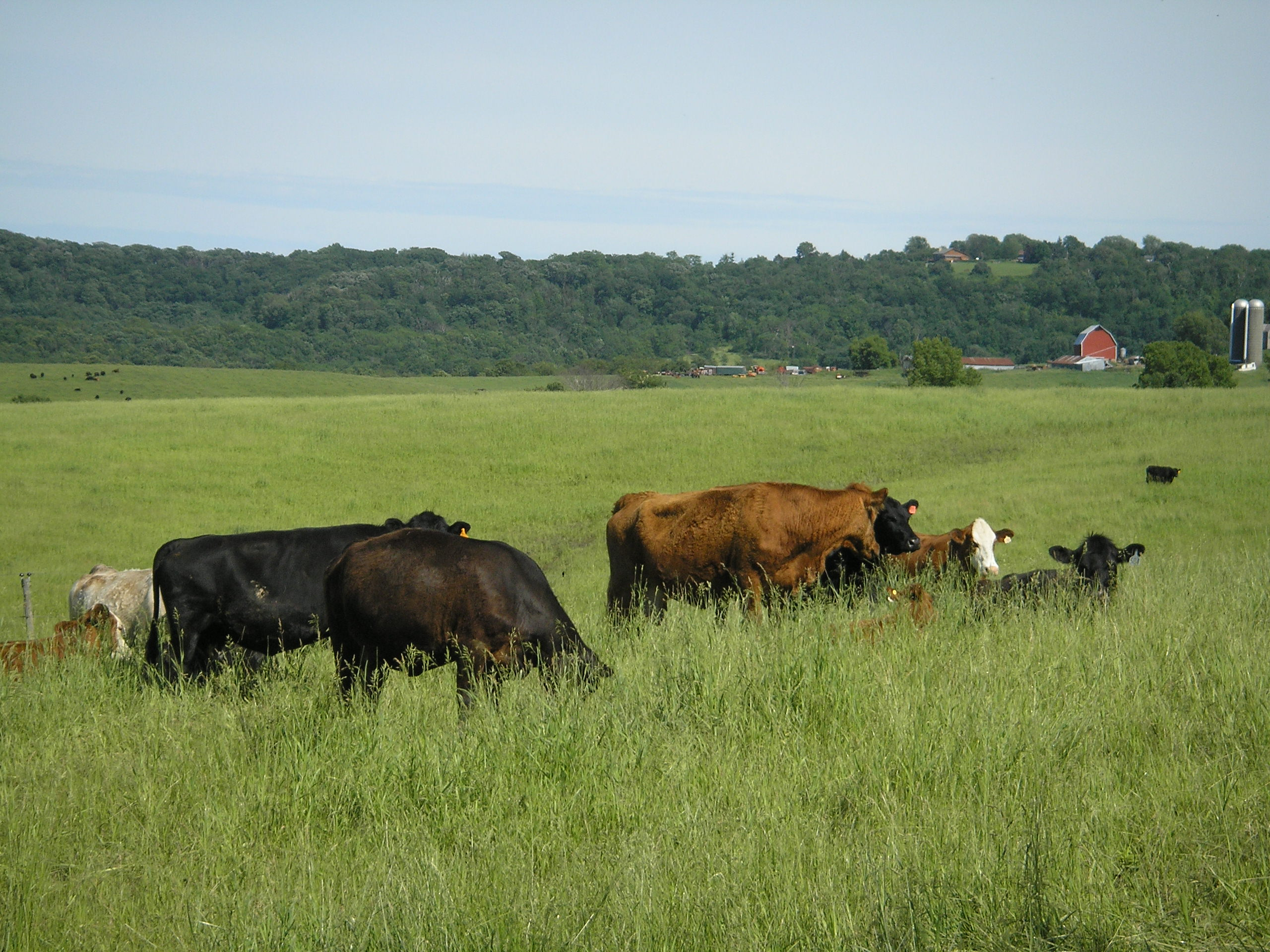
The abbey operates a farm, this is a picture of some of the livestock.

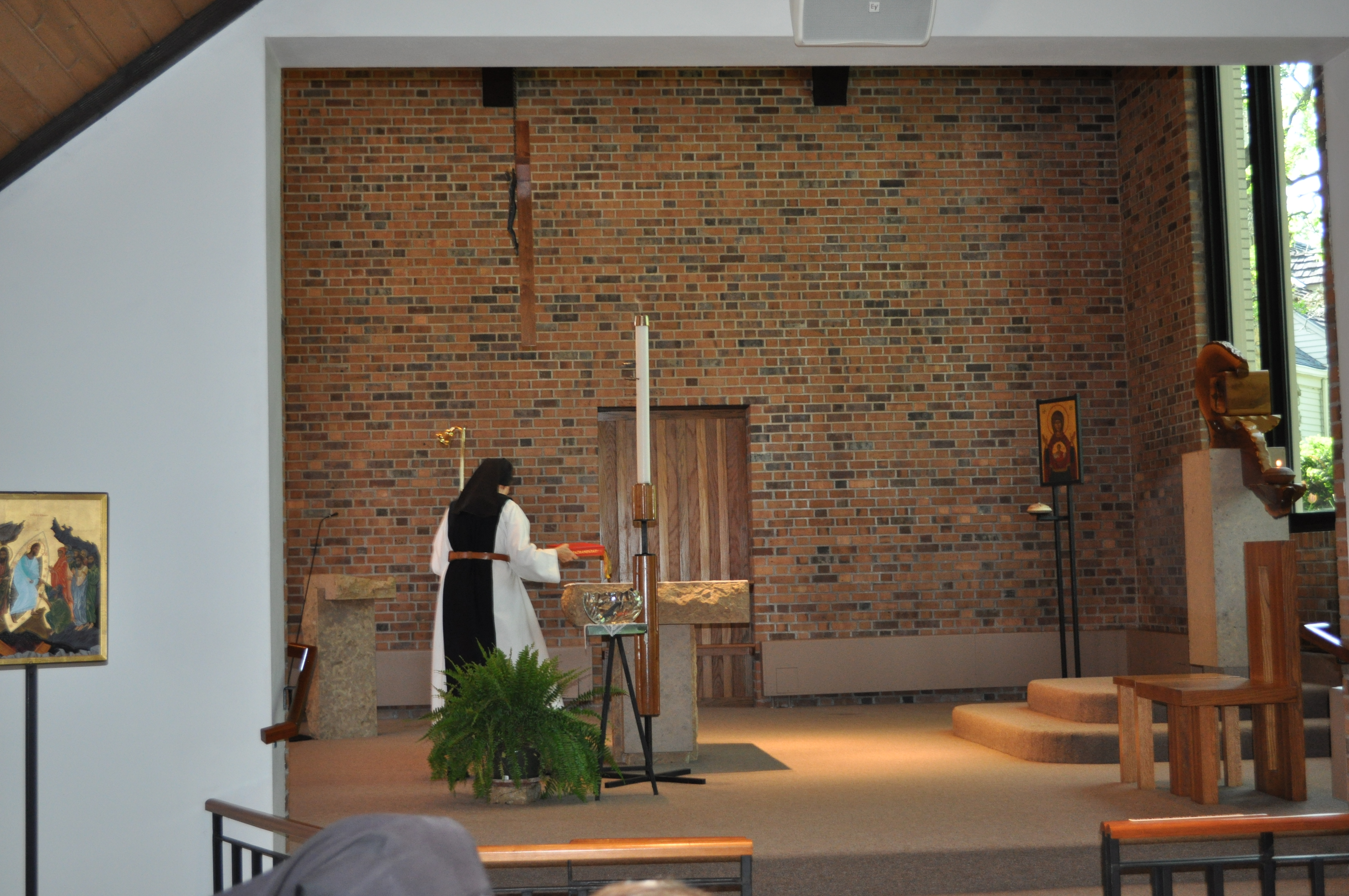
Side view of the altar and one of the nuns at the Abbey of Our Lady of the Mississippi.
