= Our Lady of the Angels Monastery, Virginia =

Trappistine monastery in Crozet, Virginia

Coordinates: 38.127628°N 78.621608°W

The Our Lady of the Angels Monastery is a 507 acres (205 ha) Trappistine monastery near Crozet, Virginia (in the Diocese of Richmond, Virginia), which sits in a small valley of the Blue Ridge Mountains near Route 64. They are cloistered from the public.

== History ==
On April 29, 1987, six nuns set out from Mount Saint Mary's Abbey in Wrentham, Massachusetts, to found a new house of Cistercian nuns. They found a cheese farm selling at a discount price with all of the dated cheese-making machinery still intact on the property.

Trappists emphasize self-sufficiency and manual labor. Therefore the idea of a small monastery producing and selling cheese to support itself appealed greatly to the nuns, and they took up residence in the two small log cabins on the property. Formally founded on May 1, Our Lady of the Angels Monastery became the fifth house of Cistercian nuns in the United States, and the first situated in the South.

Work soon began on the new brick monastery for the Sisters on a nearby hill. The new structure was dedicated on April 29, 1989. The building had a small chapel that is open to the public daily, where the Sisters celebrate mass with a live-in priest and receive daily communion.

Learning to work the cheese-making machinery proved a challenge for the inexperienced Sisters, who knew nothing about the art and were working with old equipment that had been out of use for some 6 years. Happily, neighbors stepped in to help out. Hearing about the dilemma, Jim and Margaret Morris, self-described aging hippies, shared their cheese-making skills and knowledge and before long the nuns were ready to sell. In November 1990 the Sisters began the production of Gouda (cheese) as their main means of self-support.

Of the original Charter group, only Sister Barbara and Sister Mary David are still in residence at OLA. Sister Barbara acts as the formation director and is in charge of vocations at the monastery. Their community has grown from the original six to a full dozen, ranging in age from 40 to 77. As their numbers grew to finally double their starting number, the Sisters realized that they would need more room for dormitories and working. Therefore, in early 2006 the Sisters briefly interrupted their cheese-making for the beginning of an expansion of their monastery. Construction finished in February, 2008, providing the community with new rooms, extra space, and (most importantly), updated machinery for the production of gouda.

== Gouda cheese ==
The nuns order on average about 800 gallons of milk per week from a neighboring Mennonite farmer. Although they do not advertise their two-lb rounds of gouda cheese, they generally sell out their 20,000 pounds by Christmas—and then receive orders for Christmas gift certificates that are ready to ship by March. However, the Sisters never make more than they need to pay the bills—even when more orders pour in than they can fill. In addition to mail-in orders for cheese, customers send in prayer intentions that the Sisters take very seriously.

== Daily Schedule ==
Following the Rule of St Benedict, in the method established by the Cistercian Order of the Strict Observance, the Sisters live a regimented monastic schedule:

3:00 - Rise
3:15 - Vigils (Night Office) private prayer, reading, breakfast, wash
6:30 - Lauds (Morning Praise) followed by half-hour silent prayer before the Blessed Sacrament
7:00 - Chapter (conference by superior, community meeting or class)
7:30 - Eucharist, Terce (Mid-morning Prayer) work until 11:00
11:40 - Sext (Midday Prayer) dinner, optional siesta, private prayer or reading
1:30 - Nones (Afternoon Prayer) work until 4:15
5:30 - Vespers - (Evening Prayer) quarter-hour silent meditation, supper, private prayer or reading
7:00 - Compline (Concluding Prayer of the day) followed by strict silence and bed

They do not take a vow of silence, but live in quiet contemplation rather than idle chatter. The Sisters take their meals in silence while listening to one Sister read aloud while they eat. Work varies according to talent, ability, and need. Cheese-making takes place once every 8 days. The sisters watch educational videos and listen to music together weekly. Computer usage is limited to work needs.

The monastery is also home to two dogs, Schipper and Zoe.

== See also ==
- Trappists
- Cistercians
- Rule of St Benedict
