= Mount Saint Mary's Abbey =

Trappistine monastery in Wrentham, Massachusetts

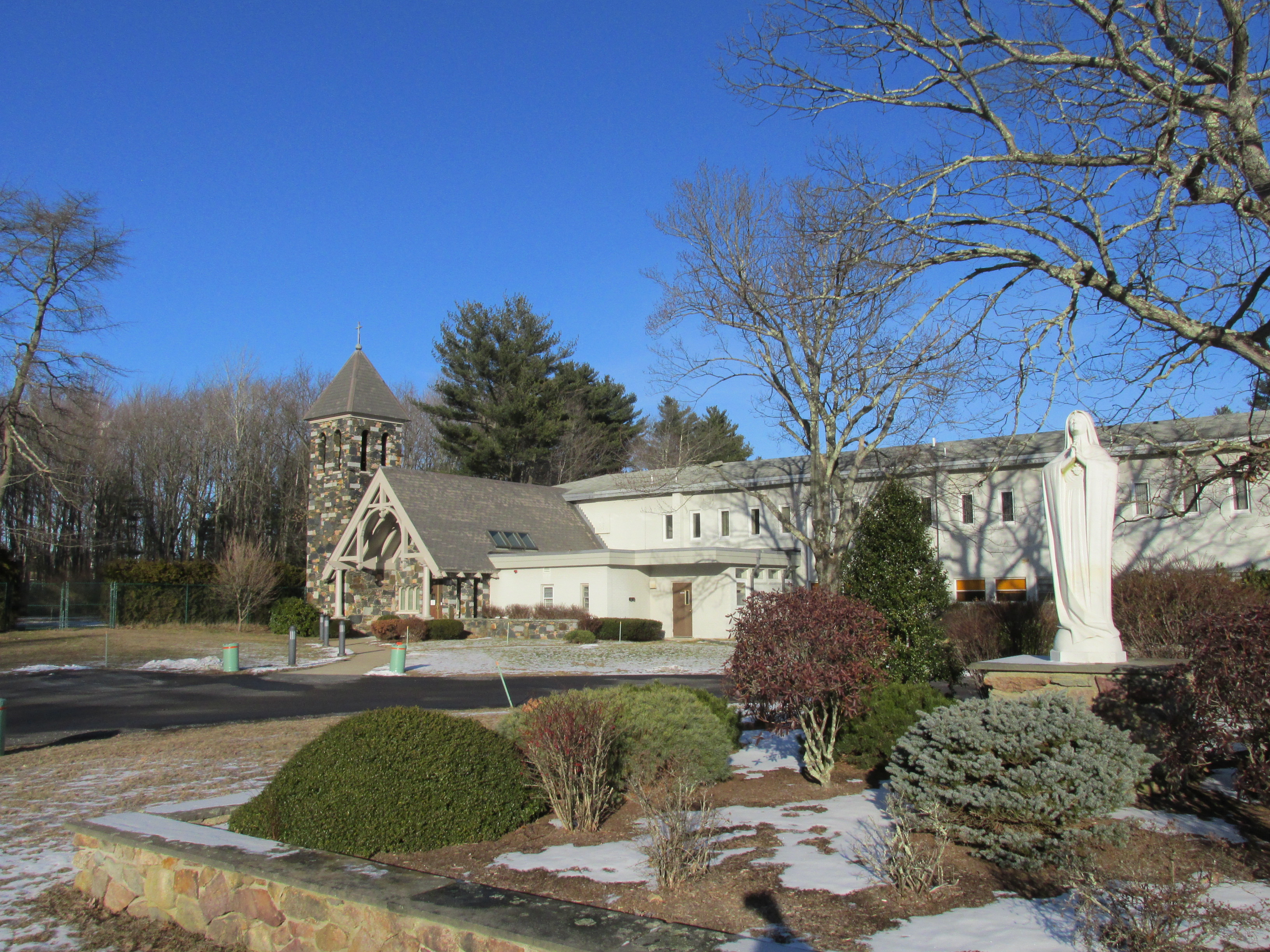
- Mount Saint Mary's Abbey
- Interactive map of Mount Saint Mary's Abbey

Monastery information
- Order: Order of Cistercians of the Strict Observance
- Established: 21 November 1949
- Mother house: St. Mary's Abbey; Glencairn, County Wexford, Ireland
- Diocese: Archdiocese of Boston

Site
- Location: Wrentham, Massachusetts; United States
- Coordinates: 42.0404°N 71.3939°W

Mount Saint Mary's Abbey is a monastic community of some fifty Trappistine nuns in Wrentham, Massachusetts. The more complete, formal name of the Order is the Cistercians of the Strict Observance, whose founding at Cîteaux, France dates back to 1098. This community follows the reforms of the Cistercian Order as established by the 17th-century Abbot Armand de Rancé at the Abbey of La Grande Trappe.

This community was founded in 1949 by nuns of an Irish monastery, St. Mary's (Glencairn) Abbey, located in County Waterford. It was the first community of Cistercians nuns in the United States. The foundation was so successful that, by the mid-1950s, all of the Irish nuns had been recalled to their original community.

Following the standard need of self-support, this community developed as their main means of income a line of candy for which they are noted. Recently the abbey had some wind turbines built, as part of their effort to help in their fuel needs and at being better stewards of the environment. The abbey partnered with Kearsarge Energy of Watertown to develop and lease 2 solar panel farms since 2013. The first produces 3.6 megawatts of direct current, the second produces 4.8 megawatts of direct current, covering 40 acres, of which the electricity is sold to neighboring Franklin, MA to provide 80% of the town's power. Combined with the wind turbines and the geothermal system, it is the first property in the state to have 3 renewable energy sources.

With the steady growth of the community, new communities of the Order were founded by this abbey in Iowa (Our Lady of the Mississippi Abbey, 1964), Arizona (Santa Rita Abbey, 1972) and Virginia (Our Lady of the Angels Monastery, 1987).
