= Perales, Palencia =

Perales
- municipality
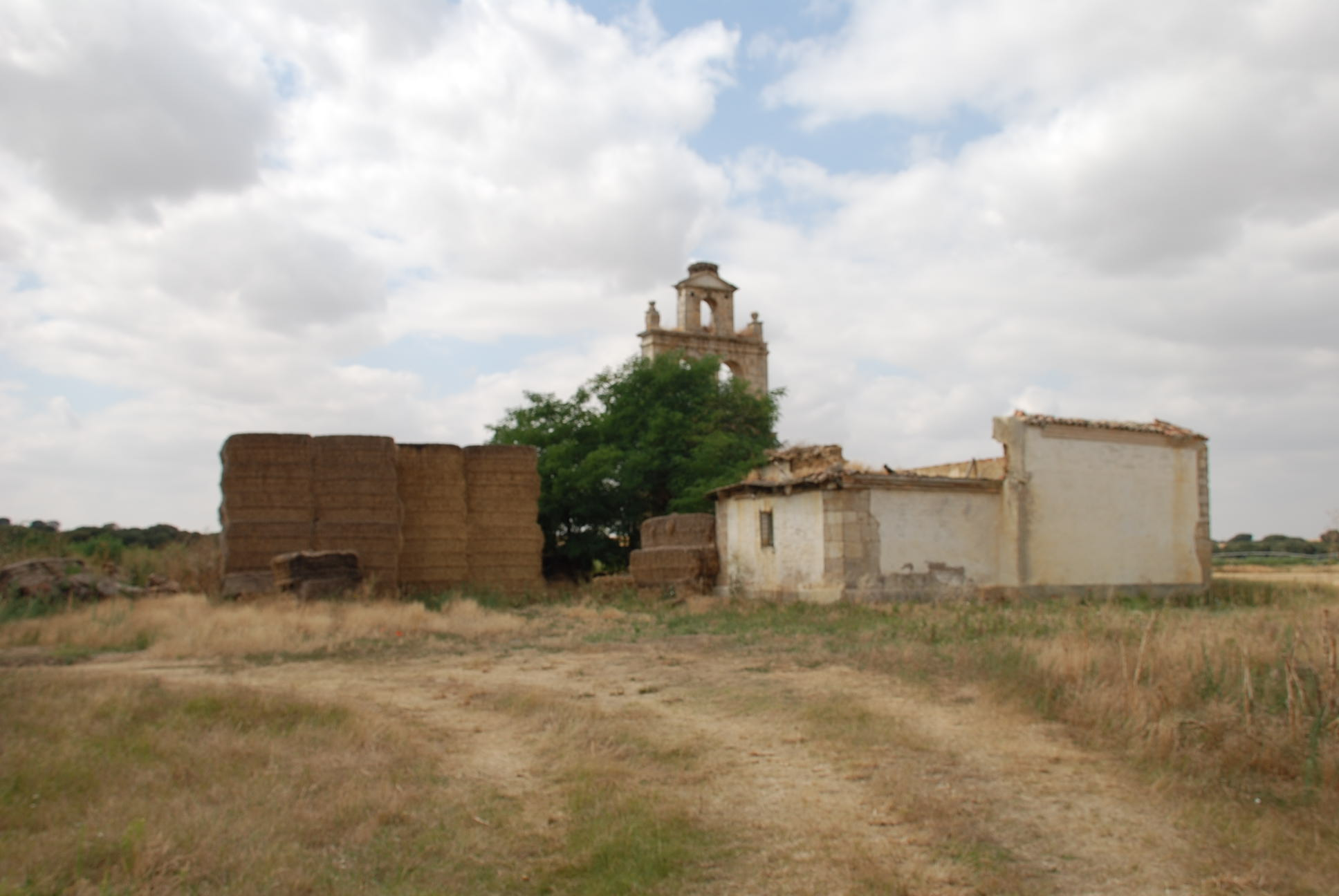

- Flag Coat of arms
- Interactive map of Perales
- Country: Spain
- Autonomous community: Castile and León
- Province: Palencia
- Municipality: Perales

Area
  - Total: 27 km^{2} (10 sq mi)

Population (2025-01-01)
  - Total: 112
  - Density: 4.1/km^{2} (11/sq mi)
- Time zone: UTC+1 (CET)
  - Summer (DST): UTC+2 (CEST)
- Website: Official website

Perales is a municipality located in the province of Palencia, Castile and León, Spain. According to the 2025 census (INE), the municipality has a population of 112 inhabitants.

== Demography ==
According to the 2004 census (INE), the municipality has a population of 107 inhabitants. By 2025 census (INE), the population has increased to 112 inhabitants.
