= Tulebras =

Municipality of Spain

Coordinates: 41°58′36″N 1°40′35″W

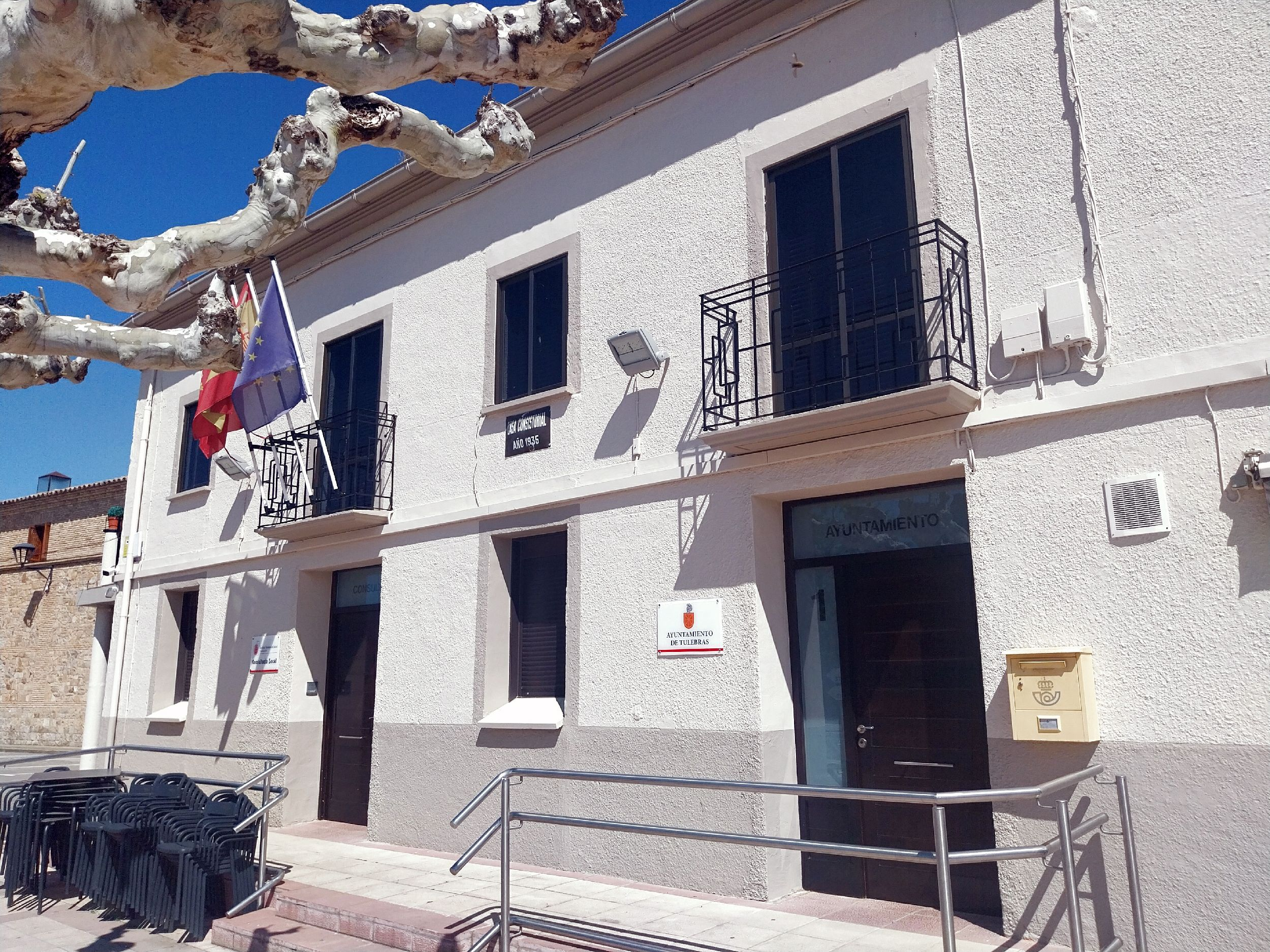
Town hall

Tulebras is a town and municipality located in the province and autonomous community of Navarre, northern Spain.
