= Seed of the woman =

Phrase in Genesis 3:15

Seed of the woman or offspring of the woman (Biblical Hebrew: זַרְעָ֑הּ, romanized: zar‘āh, lit. 'her seed') is a phrase from the Book of Genesis: as a result of the serpent's temptation of Eve, which resulted in the fall of man, God announces (in Genesis 3:15) that he will put enmity between the seed of the serpent and the seed of the woman. In Judaism, the "seed of the woman" is taken as a collective reference to humankind in general. In Christianity, however, this verse is known as the protoevangelium, (Note: Alternative spellings include protevangelium, proto-evangelium and protoevangelion.) and is interpreted as a prophecy of the coming of Jesus.

== Source text ==
In Genesis 3, Eve is tempted by a serpent to disobey God's orders and eat from the tree of the knowledge of good and evil. When confronted by God, she blames the serpent for her actions. God therefore curses the serpent to crawl on its belly and eat dust, and adds:

and I will put enmity between thee and the woman, and between thy seed and her seed: he shall bruise thy head, and thou shalt bruise his heel.

— Genesis 3:15, American Standard Version

There are several different ways of translating this verse. The Latin Vulgate, which is generally used as a source text for Catholic bibles, has feminine rather than masculine pronouns in the latter half of the verse. Additionally, the second occurrence of the Hebrew shuph (שׁוּף), "bruise", is translated in the Vulgate as insidiaberis, "lie in wait". Consequently, Catholic bibles often give a reading such as that found in the Douay–Rheims Bible: "... she shall crush thy head, and thou shalt lie in wait for her heel".

The first shuph may also be translated as "crush" ("he shall crush thy head"). Authors such as H. C. Leupold have argued that a zeugma is employed to give the word a different meaning when applied to the injury inflicted on the heel.

Many modern translations, such as the New American Standard (2020), English Standard Version, New English Translation, New International Version, New Living Translation and New Revised Standard Version have "offspring" instead of the more literal "seed".

== Judaism ==
The earliest commentaries on the passage date back to the early Second Temple period, where many Jewish theologians held that the passage was messianic, as recorded in the Aramaic Targum. In this reading, mankind could overcome the serpent by keeping the law, but if mankind failed they would be bruised by the serpent. Only the Messiah would truly keep the law, bruise the serpent's head, and heal those who were bruised.

In later rabbinical Judaism, the contrasting groups of "seed of the woman" and "seed of the serpent" were generally taken as plural, with the promise "he will bruise your head" applied to Adam and humankind bruising the serpent's head, with no messianic implications.

== Christianity ==
=== Christ ===
In Christianity, Genesis 3:15 is known as the protevangelium. This is a compound of two Greek words, protos meaning "first" and evangelion meaning "good news" or "gospel". Thus, the verse is commonly referred to as the first mention in the Bible of the "good news" of salvation. Old Testament scholar Derek Kidner describes the Protoevangelium as "the first glimmer of the gospel", and Victor P. Hamilton emphasises the importance of the redemptive promise included in the curse.

Early Christians maintained the messianic view expressed in the Aramaic Targums, and it became a standard part of Christology. The reference to the "seed of the woman" is believed by Christians to be a prophecy of the virgin birth of Jesus. They believe that elsewhere in the Bible, a child is referred to as the "seed" of his father, exclusively. In fact, there are other passages when the Hebrew for seed (זרע/זרעך) is used for a woman. In Genesis 16:10 an angel says to Hagar, a woman, "I will multiply thy seed exceedingly, that it shall not be numbered for multitude." Hagar was not a virgin, therefore one cannot conclude that the seed of a woman must refer to a virgin birth. However, this exception in the case of Hagar is very probably due to her unique status as the “true” progenitor of her descendants through Ishmael, since Abraham was not her legal husband. In fact, during the binding of Isaac, God explicitly describes Isaac as Abraham’s only son. In the case of Genesis 3:15, on the other hand, it is the seed of woman in general, for which virgin birth would apply especially in light of Isaiah’s specific prophecy of Immanuel.

Jesus is called the "seed of David" at Romans 1:3, and the whole nation of Israel is referred to as the "seed of Jacob" at Jeremiah 33:26. For Jesus to be called the "seed of the woman", therefore, is interpreted to mean that he will have no earthly father. The phrase "seed of the woman" is sometimes counted as referring to Jesus.

Identification of the "seed of the woman" with Jesus goes back at least as far as Irenaeus (180 AD), who (along with several other Church Fathers) regarded this verse as "the first messianic prophecy in the Old Testament". Serapion, the Bishop of Thmuis, wrote the following:

The woman does not have seed, only man does. How then was that (Gen 3:15) said of the Woman? Is it not evident that there is here question of Christ, whom the holy Virgin brought forth without seed? As a matter of fact, the singular is used, "of the seed", and not the plural, "of the seeds". The seed of the woman is referred to again in Revelation 12:17.

Among those who follow a Christological interpretation of the verse, the bruising of the serpent's head is taken to refer primarily to the final defeat of Satan, while the bruising of the heel of the seed of the woman is taken to refer to the crucifixion of Christ. Louis Berkhof, for example, wrote: "The death of Christ, who is in a preeminent sense the seed of the woman, will mean the defeat of Satan."

A tradition found in some old eastern Christian sources (including the Kitab al-Magall and the Cave of Treasures) holds that the serpent's head was crushed at Golgotha, described as a skull-shaped hill at the centre of the Earth, where Shem and Melchizedek had placed the body of Adam.

In Romans 16:20, there is perhaps the clearest reference to the Protoevangelium in the New Testament, "And the God of peace shall bruise Satan under your feet shortly. The grace of our Lord Jesus Christ be with you. Amen." Here, the seed of the woman is identified as "the God of peace", and yet the Church is identified as the feet that will bruise Satan's head. Martin Luther, in his Lectures on Romans, also identifies the seed of the woman with "the word of God in the church".

=== Mary ===
Catholics often understand the "woman" of Genesis 3:15 to refer to the Virgin Mary as well as Eve. The text in Genesis is also seen as connecting to the sign the Lord gives to King Achaz through Isaiah 7:14, "Therefore the Lord himself will give you a sign. Behold, the virgin shall conceive and bear a son, and shall call his name Immanuel." The English Douay–Rheims Bible 1609 onwards has "she shall crush thy head, and thou shalt lie in wait for her heel". This reading was supported in the Bull Ineffabilis Deus of December 1854 and is defended by Anthony Maas in the 1912 Catholic Encyclopedia.

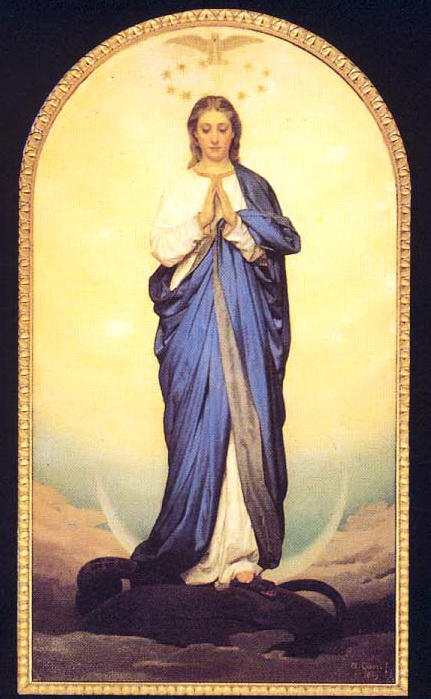
Immaculata, by Antonio Ciseri

Having interpreted the seed of the serpent as a reference to the followers of Satan, Maas also writes:

One may be tempted to understand the seed of the woman in a similar collective sense, embracing all who are born of God. But seed not only may denote a particular person, but has such a meaning usually, if the context allows it. St. Paul (Galatians 3:16) gives this explanation of the word 'seed' as it occurs in the patriarchal promises: "To Abraham were the promises made and to his Seed. He saith not, and to his seeds, as of many; but as of one, and to his Seed, which is Christ."

The Anglican-Roman Catholic International Commission explains the controversy:

The Hebrew text of Genesis 3:15 speaks about enmity between the serpent and the woman, and between the offspring of both. The personal pronoun (hu’) in the words addressed to the serpent, "He will strike at your head", is masculine. In the Greek translation used by the early Church (LXX), however, the personal pronoun autos (he) cannot refer to the offspring ... but must refer to a masculine individual who could then be the Messiah, born of a woman. The Vulgate translates the clause as ipsa. ... This feminine pronoun supports a reading of this passage as referring to Mary which has become traditional in the Latin Church.

Modern Catholic bibles often refrain from using feminine pronouns in this verse. The revised Latin version, Nova Vulgata, authorised by the Vatican, has the neuter ipsum instead of ipsa; the New Jerusalem Bible has "it [the seed] will bruise your head"; and the New American Bible has "they", explaining in a footnote that "offspring" is a collective noun, referring to "all the descendants of the woman".

Many scholars connect Jesus’ usage of the word “woman” to call Mary instead of calling her "mother" as a confirmation of Mary being the "Woman" described in Genesis 3:15. Mary was often seen as the "New Eve," who crushed the serpent's head at the Annunciation by obeying the Angel Gabriel when he said she would bear the Messiah (Luke 1:38).

In accordance with this design, Mary the Virgin is found obedient, saying: “Behold the handmaid of the Lord; be it unto me according to your word.” Luke 1:38 But Eve was disobedient, for she did not obey when as yet she was a virgin. ... having become disobedient, was made the cause of death, both to herself and to the entire human race; so also did Mary, having a man betrothed [to her], and being nevertheless a virgin, by yielding obedience, become the cause of salvation, both to herself and the whole human race.

— Irenaeus, Against Heresies, Book III, Chapter 22
