= Jean Dolce =

- Bishop of Bayonne
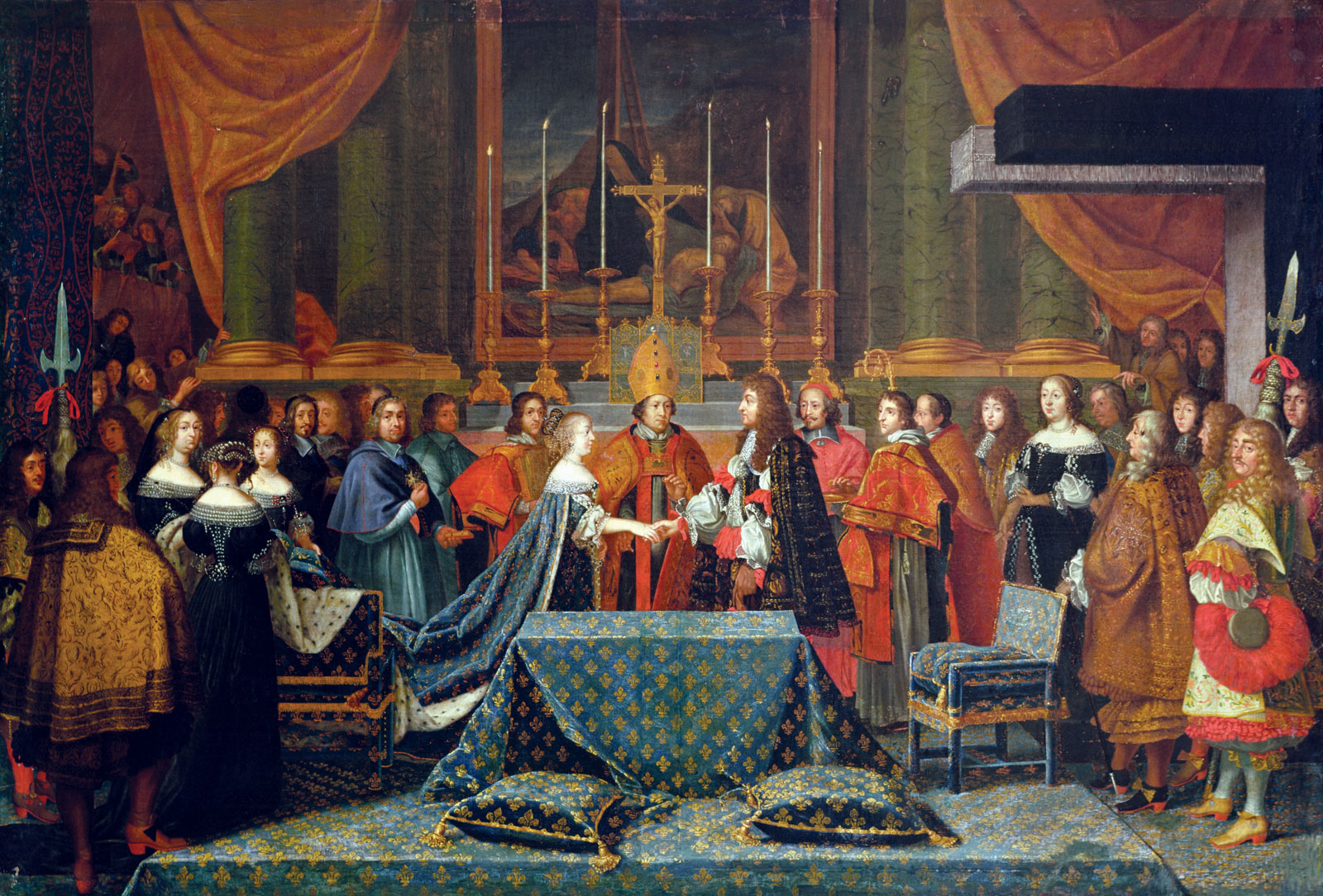
- Mons. Dolce officiating at the marriage of King Louis XIV and Maria Theresa of Spain, in Saint-Jean-de-Luz on 9 June 1660
- Native name: Joan Oltze
- Church: Catholic Church
- Diocese: Diocese of Bayonne
- In office: 31 August 1643 – 8 February 1681
- Predecessor: François Fouquet
- Successor: Gaspard de Prielé
- Previous posts: Bishop of Agde (1643); Bishop of Boulogne (1632-1643)

Orders
- Consecration: 1633 by Bertrand d'Eschaud

Personal details
- Born: 1605 Iholdy, Lower Navarre, Kingdom of France
- Died: 8 February 1681 (aged 75–76)

Jean Dolce (1605, Bayonne – 8 February 1681) was a French cleric who became bishop of Boulogne from 1633 to 1643, allowing the first Minimes house in the city in 1642. He was made bishop of Agde in 1643 but before he could be installed was transferred to be bishop of Bayonne. His uncle was Bertrand d'Eschaux, archbishop of Tours.

== Sources ==
- Eugène Van Drival, Histoire des évêques de Boulogne, Boulogne-sur-Mer, Berger frères, 1852

Religious titles
Preceded by Victor Le Bouthillier	Bishop of Boulogne; 1633-1643	Succeeded by François Perrochel
Preceded by Fulcran de Barrès	Bishop of Agde; 1643	Succeeded by François Fouquet
Preceded by François Fouquet	Bishop of Bayonne; 1643-1681	Succeeded by Gaspard de Priêle
