= Claude Bouthillier =

French statesman and diplomat

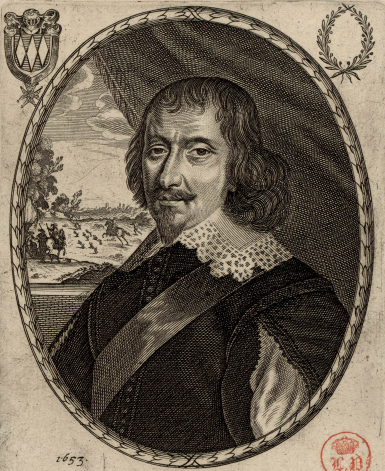
Claude Bouthillier

Claude Bouthillier, Sieur de Fouilletourte (1581 – 13 March 1652) was a French statesman and diplomat. He held a number of offices, including Secretary of State and Superintendent of Finances, and distinguished himself in diplomacy throughout the 1630s, particularly in respect to France's entry into the Thirty Years' War.

Bouthillier was a shrewd diplomat who was favoured with most factions and prominent people of the French court, particularly Cardinal Richelieu and Marie de Medici. At the height of his power he was the second most powerful man in France after Richelieu himself.

== Early life ==
Claude Bouthillier was born in 1581, the son of Denis Bouthillier, a clerk in the service of François de La Porte, Cardinal Richelieu's maternal grandfather. When La Porte died, he left his professional law practice to Denis Bouthillier, as well as entrusting him with the well-being of La Porte's orphaned grandchildren. This created a strong connection between the La Porte and Bouthillier families and saw the Bouthilliers greatly increase their power and wealth.

== Career ==
Claude Bouthillier began his professional life as an advocate. In 1613 he became a councillor in the Parlement of Paris. In 1619 Richelieu recommended him to the queen-mother, Marie de Medici, which led to his position as "Executive Secretary to the Queen-mother".

Cardinal Richelieu also secured for him the title of Secretary of State in 1628. In 1632 he became Superintendent of Finances. In spite of the fierce rivalry developing between Marie de Medici and Richelieu, he was able to remain on good terms with both, which placed him in a highly enviable position at the French court.

=== Diplomacy ===
Richelieu employed him on many diplomatic missions, and the success of his foreign policy was due in no small degree to Bouthillier's ability and devotion. In 1630 he had taken part at Regensburg in arranging the abortive treaty between the emperor and France. From 1633 to 1640 he was continually busied with secret missions in Germany, sometimes alone, sometimes with Father Joseph. Following Richelieu's instructions, he negotiated the alliances which brought France into the Thirty Years' War.

Due to his tact, amiable disposition, and his reputation for straightforwardness, had secured for him a position of influence in a court at his hometown. Trusted by the king, the confidant of Richelieu, the friend of Marie de Medici, and through his son, Leon, who was appointed in 1635 chancellor to Gaston d'Orléans. As the head of both the finances and the foreign policy of France, made him, next to the cardinal, the most powerful man in the kingdom.

Richelieu made him executor of his will, and Louis XIII named him a member of the council of regency which he intended should govern the kingdom after his death.

=== Retirement ===
The king's last plans were not carried out, and Bouthillier was obliged to retire into private life, giving up his office of Superintendent of Finances in June 1643.

He died in Paris on 13 March 1652.

== Family ==
Claude Bouthillier had three brothers, all of whom became distinguished member of French society and staunch allies of Richelieu.

Victor Le Bouthillier, was a statesman and member of the clergy who served as Archbishop of Tours between 1641 and 1670. Sébastien Bouthillier, was bishop of Aire and played an important role in obtaining Richelieu's return from exile to Avignon in 1619. Denis Bouthillier, Lord of Rancé, was a state councillor and advisor of Marie de Medici. Denis' son, Armand Jean le Bouthillier de Rancé, was the founder of the Trappist monastic order.

Claude Bouthillier married Marie de Bragelogne and had one child, Léon Bouthillier, comte de Chavigny (1608–1652). Léon quickly became an associate to his father, who took him with him from 1629 to 1632 to all the great courts of Europe, instructing him in diplomacy. In 1632 he was named secretary of state and seconded his father's work, so that it is not easy always to distinguish their respective parts. He was accompanied on various errands by Jean François Sarrazin. After the death of Louis XIII he had to give up his office; but was sent as plenipotentiary to the negotiations at Münster. He showed himself incapable, however, giving himself up to pleasure and fetes, and returned to France to intrigue against Mazarin. Arrested twice during the Fronde, and then for a short time in power during Mazarin's exile (April 1651), he busied himself with small intrigues which came to nothing. His many children married in several important aristocratic families, further establishing the Bouthillier family's influence.
