= Pierre Charron =

French theologian and philosopher (1541–1603)

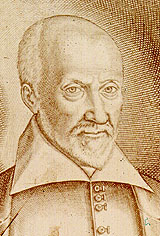
- Born: 1541; Paris, France
- Died: 16 November 1603 (aged 61–62); Paris, France

Philosophical work
- Era: Renaissance philosophy
- Region: Western philosophy
- School: Scepticism

Pierre Charron (French pronunciation: [pjɛʁ ʃaʁɔ̃]; 1541 – 16 November 1603) was a French Catholic theologian and major contributor to the new thought of the 17th century. He is remembered for his controversial form of skepticism and his separation of ethics from religion as an independent philosophical discipline.

== Biography ==
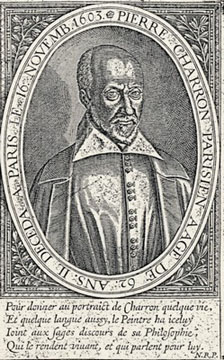
Pierre Charron's obituary

Pierre Charron was born in Paris, one of the twenty-five children of a bookseller. After studying law at Orléans and Bourges he practiced as an advocate, for a few years. He then entered the church and soon became a popular priest, rising to become a canon.

He moved to the southwest of France, invited by Arnaud de Pontac, Bishop of Bazas. He was appointed priest in ordinary to Marguerite de Valois, wife of Henry IV of Navarre. In about 1588, Charron decided to become a monk, but being rejected by both the Carthusians and the Celestines, he returned to his old profession. He delivered a course of sermons at Angers, and in the next year moved to Bordeaux, where he formed a famous friendship with Michel de Montaigne. On Montaigne's death, in 1592, Charron was requested in the will to bear the Montaigne arms.

From 1594, he used his own name; he spent from 1594 to 1600 under the protection of Antoine Hérbrard de Saint-Sulpice, Bishop of Cahors, who appointed him grand vicar and theological canon. His first book led to his being chosen deputy to the general assembly of the clergy, for which he became chief secretary.

Charron retired to Condom in 1600; he died suddenly of a stroke; his works were then receiving attention.

== Works ==
Charron first published his works anonymously. Later he wrote under the name of "Benoit Vaillant, Advocate of the Holy Faith." While Charron's reading of Montaigne is now considered dogmatic and indeed something of a distortion, it was important in its time and during the 17th century as a whole.

=== Les Trois Vérités ===
In 1594, he published a long work, Les Trois Vérités, in which Charron sought to prove that there is a God and a true religion, that the true religion is Christianity, and that the true church is Roman Catholicism. It was a response to the Protestant work Le Traité de l'Eglise, by Philippe de Mornay. In the second edition (1595), there is an elaborate reply to criticisms of the third Vérité by a Protestant writer. Les Trois Vérités ran through several editions.

=== Discours chretiens ===
Then followed, in 1600, Discours chretiens, a book of sermons with a similar tone, half of which is about the Eucharist.

=== De la sagesse ===
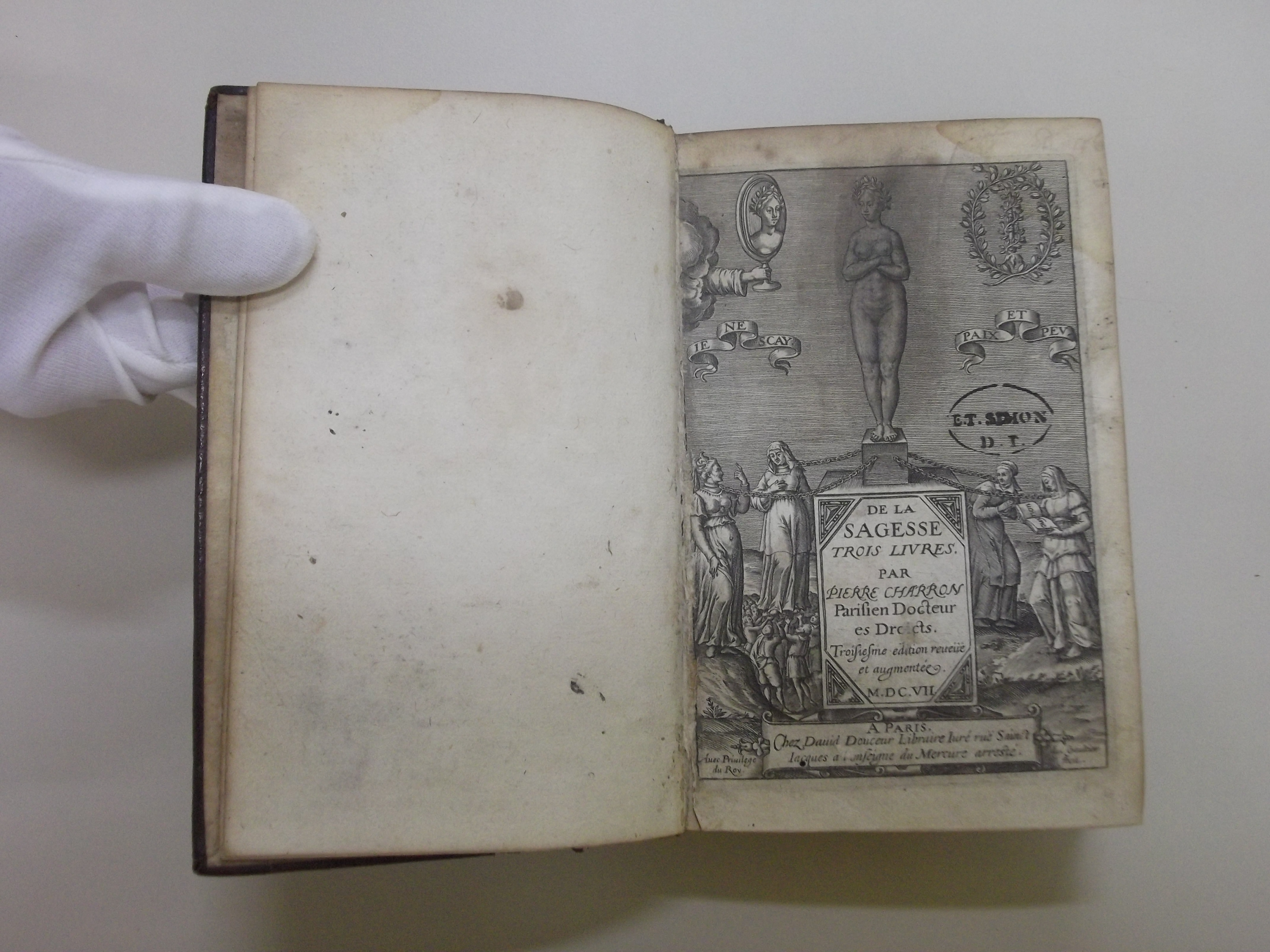
De la sagesse : trois livres / par Pierre Charron. – 3me ed. rev. et augm.– Paris : David Deuceur Libraire Iuré, 1607.

In 1601, Charron published in Bordeaux his third work, De la sagesse, a system of moral philosophy that develops ideas of Montaigne. Charron also connected Montaigne's scepticism with the anti-rational strand in Christianity. It received the support of Henry IV and of magistrate Pierre Jeannin. A second revised edition appeared in 1603, supported by Claude Dormy, the second Bishop of Boulogne.

De la sagesse also was attacked, in particular by the Jesuit François Garasse (1585–1631), who described Charron as an atheist.

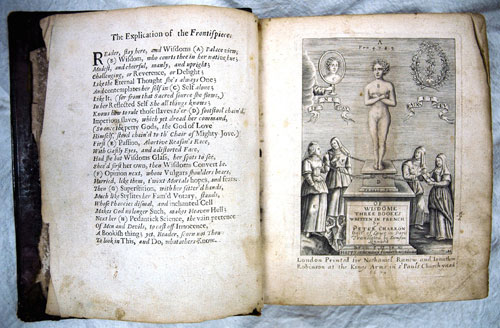
Pierre Charron; "Of Wisdom" London: Printed for Nathaniel Ranew and Jonathan Robinson, 1670

A summary and defence of the book, written shortly before his death, appeared in 1606. In 1604, Charron's friend Michel de la Roche prefixed a "Life" to an edition of De la sagesse, which depicts Charron as an amiable man of good character. His complete works, with this contribution by de la Roche, were published in 1635. An abridgment of the Sagesse is given in Wilhelm Gottlieb Tennemann's Philosophie, vol. ix. An edition with notes by A. Duval appeared in 1820. It was translated into English as Of Wisdome (1612) by Samson Lennard; and again by George Stanhope (1697).

== Views ==
=== Influences ===
Apart from the major influence of Montaigne, Charron took from Raymond of Sabunde (Sibiuda). Another influence was neostoicism, as handled by Justus Lipsius.

=== Psychology ===
According to Charron, the soul, located in the ventricles of the brain, is affected by the temperament of the individual; the dry temperament produces acute intelligence; the moist, memory; the hot, imagination. Dividing the intelligent soul into these three faculties, he writes the branches of science corresponding with each. On the nature of the soul, he quotes opinions. The belief in its immortality, he says, is the most universal of beliefs, but the most feebly supported by reason. As to a human's power of attaining truth, he declares that none of our faculties enable us to distinguish truth from error. In comparing humans with animals, Charron insists that there are no breaks in nature. Though inferior in some respects, in others, animals are superior. Namely, humanity's essential qualities are vanity, weakness, inconstancy, and presumption.

=== Theology ===
Charron writes that all religions teach that God is to be appeased by prayers, presents, vows, but especially, and, most irrationally, by human suffering. Each religion is said by its devotees to have commenced by divine inspiration. A human is a Christian, Jew, or Muslim, before he or she knows that they are persons. Furthermore, he writes that one religion is built upon another.

While Charron declares religion to be "strange to common sense," the practical result at which he arrives is that one is not to sit in judgment on his or her faith, but to be "simple and obedient," and to submit to public authority. He writes that this is one rule of wisdom with regard to religion. Another equally important is to avoid superstition, which he defines as the belief that God is like a hard judge who, eager to find fault, narrowly examines our slightest act, that he is vengeful and hard to appease, and that, therefore, he must be flattered and won over by pain and sacrifice.

Charron states that true piety, which is the first of duties, is the knowledge of God and of one's self; the latter knowledge being necessary to the former. The belief that what God sends is all good, and that all the bad is from ourselves is the abasing of humanity and the exalting of God. It leads to spiritual worship, for external ceremony is merely for our advantage, not for his glory.

=== Politics ===
Charron declares the sovereign to be the source of law, and asserts that popular freedom is dangerous.

== Bibliography ==
=== Works ===
- De la Sagesse Livres Trois; par M. Pierre le Charron, Parisien, Chanoine Theologal & Chantre en l'Eglise Cathedrale de Comdom Bourdeaus, S. Millanges, 1604.
- Toutes les Oeuvres de Pierre Charron; Parisien, Docteur es Droiets, Chantre et Chanoine Theologal de Condom derniere edition. Reveues, corrigees & augmentees. 2 vols. Paris Jacques Villery, 1635.
- Discours chrétiens (Bordeaux, 1600).

=== Secondary sources ===
- Michel Adam, Etudes sur Pierre Charron. Bordeaux: Presses Universitaires de Bordeaux, 1991.
- Henry Thomas Buckle, Introduction to History of Civilization in England, vol. ii. 19.
- Claudiu Gaiu, La prudence de l’homme d’esprit. L’éthique de Pierre Charron. Préface de Denis Kambouchner, Bucharest: Zeta Books, 2010.
- Tullio Gregory, "Pierre Charron's Scandalous Book", p. 87-110 in: Michael Hunter & David Wootton (eds.), Atheism from the Reformation to the Enlightenment, Clarendon Press, Oxford, 1992. ISBN 0-19-822736-1.
- Francoise Kaye, Charron et Montaigne; du plagiat a l'originalite, Ottawa: Editions de l'Universite d'Ottawa, 1982.
- William Edward Hartpole Lecky, Rationalism in Europe (1865).
- Adrien Lezat, De la predication sous Henri IV. c. vi.
- Hugo Liebscher, Charron u. sein Werk, De la sagesse (Leipzig, 1890).
- John Mackinnon Robertson, Short History of Free Thought (London, 1906), vol. ii.
- John Owen, Skeptics of the French Renaissance (1893).
- Jeffrey Zuniga, Toward a Life of Wisdom, Pierre Charron in the Light of Modern and Postmodern skepticism Manila: University of St. Thomas Press, 2000.
