= La Balisa =

- Location within Switzerland
- Elevation: 1,411 metres (4,629 ft)
- Traversed by: Trail

Third Approach
- Location: Fribourg, Switzerland
- Range: Alps
- Coordinates: 46°39′15″N 07°14′39″E

La Balisa (1,411 m) is a high mountain pass of the Swiss Alps, connecting Schwarzsee with Charmey via La Valsainte in the canton of Fribourg. The pass lies on the watershed between the Sense and Le Javro. The pass is traversed by a trail.
