= De la Sagesse =

De la Sagesse (On Wisdom) is a book by Pierre Charron, published in 1601. It argues ethics can be separated from philosophy, and that questioning reason with skepticism can strengthen faith.
