= Léon Bouthillier, comte de Chavigny =

French foreign minister (1608–1652)

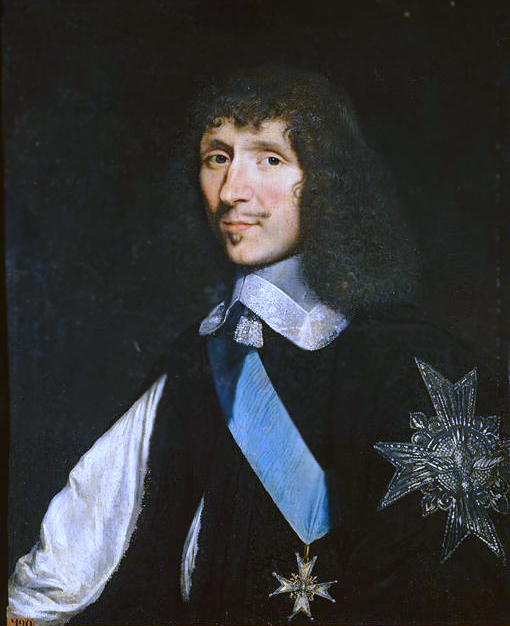
Léon Bouthillier, comte de Chavigny

Léon Bouthillier, comte de Chavigny (March 28, 1608 – October 11, 1652) was a Foreign Minister of France to Louis XIII.

== Life ==
He was associated with his father, Claude Bouthillier, who took him to all major courts of Europe, tutoring in diplomacy, from 1629 to 1632. To differentiate Bouthillier father and son, Leo was called "The Younger". Léon's brother Victor became archbishop of Tours.

On March 18, 1632, he was appointed Secretary of State for Foreign Affairs. In 1635, he signed a treaty of alliance with Holland and Sweden.

He acts as messenger between Gaston d'Orleans and the government. He is also a friend of Mazarin, but their friendship does not survive the period of the regency.

After the death of Louis XIII, he relinquished his office June 23, 1643 but he was sent as plenipotentiary in the negotiations of Munster. Returning to France, he intrigued against Mazarin and approaches the Prince of Conde. He was arrested twice during the Fronde.

In October 1652, just before his death he made a large donation to Anthony Singlin, Jansen, Director of Port Royal, who is even suspected of extortion on this occasion.

His son, Armand Jean le Bouthillier de Rancé, was the founder of the Trappist order. Another son, François-Denis, was bishop of Troyes and Roman Catholic Archdiocese of Sens.

Political offices
| Preceded by Claude Bouthillier | Foreign Minister of France; 18 March 1632 – 23 June 1643 | Succeeded by Henri-Auguste de Loménie, comte de Brienne |
