= Claude Le Tonnelier de Breteuil =

French cleric

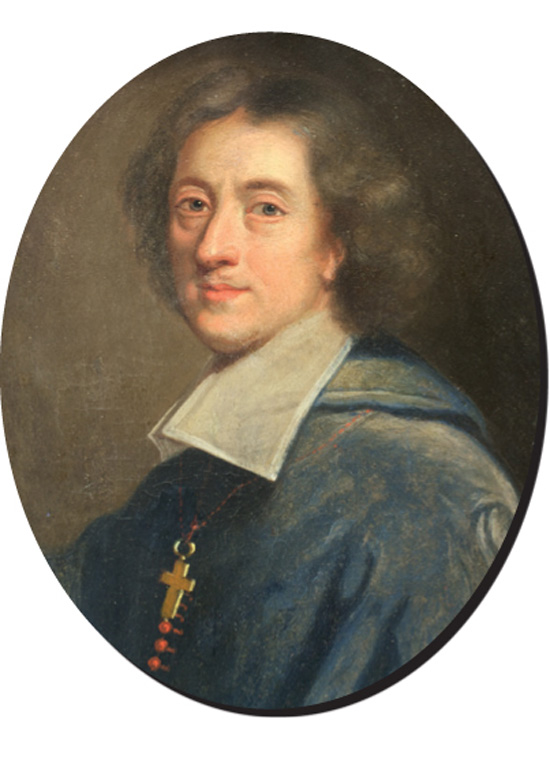

Claude Le Tonnelier de Breteuil (died 8 January 1698, Paris) was a French cleric.

He was the son of François Le Tonnelier, seigneur de Breteuil et de Boisette, intendant des finances, and his wife Anne de Chaulmes. He was made bishop of Boulogne in 1682, succeeding Nicolas Ladvocat-Billiard. During his time in the see, he welcomed James II of Great Britain to Boulogne when he fled to the continent after the Glorious Revolution. He died in office and was succeeded by Antoine-Girard de La Bournat

== Sources ==
- Eugène Van Drival, Histoire des évêques de Boulogne, Boulogne-sur-Mer, 1852
