= Augustin de Lestrange =

French Trappist abbot

Dom Augustin de Lestrange
- Born: Louis-Henri de Lestrange; 1754; Château de Colombier-le-Vieux, Ardèche, France
- Died: 16 July 1827 (aged 72–73); Lyon, France
- Occupation: Trappist abbot
- Parent(s): Louis-César de Lestrange (father), Jeanne-Perrette de Lalor (mother)
- Church: Catholic Church
- Ordained: 1778

Augustin de Lestrange (secular name Louis-Henri de Lestrange) (born in 1754, in the Château de Colombier-le-Vieux, Ardèche, France; died at Lyon, 16 July 1827) was a French Trappist abbot, an exile from France after the French Revolution.

== Life ==
He was the fourteenth child of Louis-César de Lestrange, officer in the household of Louis XV, and Jeanne-Perrette de Lalor, daughter of an Irish gentleman who had followed James II of England to France in 1688. The younger de Lestrange was ordained priest in 1778, and was attached to the parish of Saint-Sulpice.

In 1780, Jean Georges Le Franc de Pompignan, Archbishop of Vienne, in Dauphiné, chose de Lestrange for his vicar-general, with the ulterior determination of having him as his coadjutor with the right of future succession. This prospect of being made bishop alarmed de Lestrange, and in the same year he severed all the ties that bound him to the world, and entered La Trappe Abbey, a Cistercian monastery.

De Lestrange was master of the novices in that monastery, when a decree of the National Assembly dated 4 December 1790 suppressed the religious orders in France. Together with twenty-four religious, de Lestrange left for Switzerland. There the senate of Fribourg authorized them to take up their residence in La Valsainte, an ancient Carthusian monastery about fifteen miles from the city of Fribourg. From La Valsainte, de Lestrange established foundations at Santa Susana in Aragon, at Mont Brac in Piedmont, at Westmalle, Belgium, and at Lulworth in England. In 1798 the French troops invaded Switzerland, and the Trappists were obliged to leave the country. Some of them settled at Kenty near Kraków; others at Zydichin, in the Diocese of Lusko, and in Podolia. In 1802 Switzerland recalled them, and de Lestrange took possession once more of La Valsainte.

In the following year de Lestrange sent a colony to America under Urbain Guillet. In 1804, de Lestrange founded the monastery of Cervara in the Republic of Genoa. Napoleon not only authorized the establishment, but granted it a revenue of 10,000 francs. Moreover, he desired that a similar institution be founded on the Alps, at Mont-Genèvre, to serve as a refuge for the soldiers who were to pass to and fro between Italy and France. To secure the success of this establishment he granted it an allowance of 24,000 francs. This protection was not, however, of long duration. The Republic of Genoa was united to the empire, and there, as in all the other states under the sway of Napoleon, an oath of fidelity to the empire was exacted from ecclesiastics and religious. The religious of Cervara, acting on the advice of some eminent personages, and of some influential members of the clergy who assured them that the pope had allowed the oath, took the oath of fidelity.

Pope Pius VII, then prisoner at Savona, informed de Lestrange of the Bull of excommunication issued against the spoliator of the Papal States. Accordingly, de Lestrange commanded the prior of Cervara to make immediate retraction. The emperor became furious. He caused de Lestrange to be arrested at Bordeaux and thrown into prison. At the same time, by a sweeping decree of 28 July, he suppressed all the Trappist monasteries throughout the empire. The prefect of Bordeaux, upon the entreaties of several of de Lestrange's friends, gave him the limits of the city for his prison. The abbot availed himself of the liberty thus accorded him to hasten the departure of his religious for America; he himself obtained from the police permission to go to La Valsainte and Mont-Genèvre, where his presence was required. Pursued again by the emperor, he crossed Germany and arrived at Riga, whence he left for England and America.

On the Caribbean island of Martinique, de Lestrange was taken into custody by the British governor, General Charles Wale, on foot of a complaint laid against him by an Irish member of the contingent from the monastery of St Susan at Lulworth, one James Power, who seems to have joined with Jeremiah O'Flynn in a quarrel with the abbot. However, de Lestrange was soon released, and, after the expulsion of his mission from Martinique, arrived in New York in December 1813. The Jesuits had just abandoned a building which they had in that city, and which they had used for a classical school. The edifice occupied the place where now stands St. Patrick's Cathedral on Fifth Avenue. For $10,000, de Lestrange purchased the site, and in 1814, on the downfall of Napoleon, he returned to France and took possession once more of his former monastery of La Trappe.

At this time, de Lestrange was accused of imposing extraordinary hardships on his religious; he was reproached with his frequent voyages and long absences. The Bishop of Séez, in whose diocese is the monastery of La Trappe, took the part of the detractors, and claimed over the monastery the authority of "direct superior". To put an end to these disputes, de Lestrange abandoned La Trappe, and sought refuge at Bellefontaine, in the Diocese of Angers. The complaints were carried to Rome and submitted to the Sacred Congregation of Bishops and Regulars, and de Lestrange was summoned to Rome. He returned justified, and loaded with favours by the pope.

His remains repose in the monastery of La Trappe in the Diocese of Séez alongside those of Armand Jean le Bouthillier de Rancé.
