= Samson Lennard =

English genealogist, officer of arms and translator

Samson Lennard (died 1633) was an English genealogist, officer of arms, and translator.

== Life ==
Although thought to be the son of William Lennard of Chevening and Knole, Kent, by Anne, daughter and heir of John Perkins of Richmond, Surrey, he was probably his grandson. He was cousin of the Sampson Lennard of Chevening who married Margaret, Baroness Dacre. His early life was spent in military service. He accompanied Sir Philip Sidney to the Netherlands, and was with him when he received his fatal wound at the battle of Zutphen in 1586.

Subsequently, he devoted himself to literature, being patronised by some of the principal persons of his time, particularly by Henry Frederick, Prince of Wales and William Herbert, 3rd Earl of Pembroke. Entering the College of Arms, he was appointed Rouge-Rose Pursuivant Extraordinary in 1613 and created Bluemantle Pursuivant 22 March 1616. He was buried in the church of St Benet, Paul's Wharf, on 17 August 1633.

== Works ==
He was the author of:

- An Exhortatory Instruction to a speedy Resolution of Repentance, and Contempt of the Vanities of this Transitory Life, London, 1609, dedicated to Lady Dacre of the South.

He also translated the following works:

- Tommaso Buoni's Problemes of Beautie (1606)
- Pierre Charron's treatise Of Wisdome (1612)
- Philippe de Mornay's Mysterie of Iniquitie (1612)
- Jean-Paul Perrin's Luther's Fore-runners, or a Cloud of Witnesses deposing for the Protestant Faith (1624), reprinted in Papal Usurpation and Tyranny, pt ii, 1711, under the title of The History of the old Waldenses and Albigenses
- The first part of Scipio Mazzella's Parthenopœia, or the History of the Kingdom of Naples (1654), edited by James Howell

Manuscript copies of most of the heraldic visitations in which he was engaged are preserved in the British Library. The following have been printed by the Harleian Society: Warwickshire, 1619; Cornwall, 1620; Dorset, 1623; Somerset, 1623; and Wiltshire, taken by him in 1623, in conjunction with Sir Henry St George, printed in 1882. Two volumes of his general and heraldic collections are in the Cotton MSS 1178 and 1452.
