= Jean-René Asseline =

French bishop and theologian

Jean-René Asseline (1742-1813) was a French bishop and theologian.

== Life ==
His early posts were as grand vicar to Christophe de Beaumont, archbishop of Paris, and teaching scripture and theology at the Sorbonne. In 1789 he was made bishop of Boulogne and commendatory abbot of Ham Abbey - he held both posts until the following year, when the abbey and the bishopric were both suppressed. He refused to swear the oath to obey the Civil Constitution of the Clergy in 1791 and emigrated to Munster, from where he criticized the Concordat of 1801.

Many bishops (not only those deposed by the revolution) endorsed in 1803 the Expostulations canoniques of Asseline, which had been published the previous year. These writings essentially denied that the Pope could depose legitimate and blameless bishops at will (and solely for political interests).

In 1807 he was summoned by Louis XVIII and served the French royal family until his death in 1813.

== Works ==
- Instruction pastorale - 1790
- Instruction sur les atteintes portées à la religion - 1798
- Expostulations canoniques - 1802
- Considérations sur le mystère de la croix, tirées des divines écritures et des œuvres des SS. Pères - Société Typographique Paris - 1806
- Exposition abrégée du symbole des apôtres - Société Typographique Paris - 1806
- La neuvaine a l'honneur de saint François Xavier de la Compagnie de Jésus, Apôtre des Indes & du Japon MDCCLXXV - Imprimerie Louis Buisson - Lyon

== Bibliography ==
- "Asseline (Jean-René)", in Michaud, Biographie universelle ancienne et moderne..., Paris, Thoisnier Desplaces, 1843–1865, t. 2, p. 336-337
