= La Trappe Abbey =

Monastery in Soligny-la-Trappe, Orne, France

Coordinates: 48°38′14″N 0°34′24″E

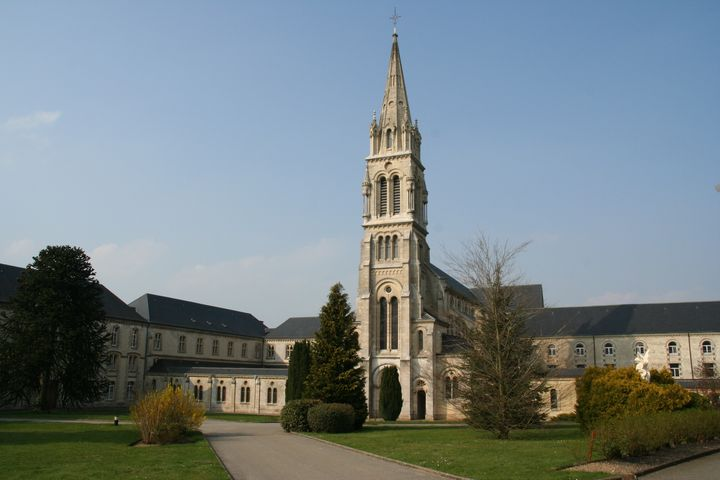
The abbey in 2006

La Trappe Abbey, also known as La Grande Trappe, is a monastery in Soligny-la-Trappe, Orne, France. It is known for being the house of origin of the Trappists, to whom it gave its name.

== History ==
The site of the famous La Trappe Abbey was for centuries isolated in a valley surrounded by forests, streams and lakes, 9 miles from Mortagne and 84 miles from Paris, in the Diocese of Séez and the former province of Normandy.

It began as a small oratory chapel to the Virgin Mary, built in 1122 by Rotrou III, Count of Perche, as a memorial to his wife Matilda FitzRoy, Countess of Perche. (An illegitimate daughter of Henry I, she drowned in the White Ship disaster of 1120.) A few years later Rotrou built a monastery adjoining, which he offered to the monks of Le Breuil-Benoît Abbey near Dreux, a house of the Order of Savigny. The order was highly respected at that time for its fervour and holiness.

In 1140 the monastery of La Trappe was raised to the status of abbey. In 1147 Savigny Abbey, with all its affiliated monasteries, was united to the Cistercian Order. From that time onwards, La Trappe was a Cistercian abbey, immediately subordinate to the abbot of Clairvaux.

After years of prosperity, La Trappe suffered during the Hundred Years' War. It was in the path of both the English and French armies. The monks were forced to abandon the monastery, which was burnt and pillaged in 1376 and again in 1465. In the 16th century, after the reconstruction, the abbey, in common with many other monasteries, was given to a series of absentee abbots in commendam. The lack of leadership depressed its fortunes.

The 14th commendatory abbot, installed in 1662, Armand Jean le Bouthillier de Rancé, godson of Cardinal Richelieu, proved to be La Trappe's greatest leader. De Rancé experienced a religious conversion which led him to take his responsibilities seriously. He became abbot in fact as well as in name. From 1664 La Trappe was the centre of a thorough reform of the Cistercian Order, led by de Rancé. The reform movement took the name of the abbey and became renowned as an order.

Bossuet, a friend of de Rancé, was a frequent visitor at La Trappe. James II of England came here while a refugee in France. The distinguished Benedictine scholar, Dom Jean Mabillon, after his long quarrels with de Rancé, visited him here to make peace.

=== After the French revolution ===
The abbey did not escape the general fate of religious houses under the French Revolution. Pursuant to the decree of 13 February 1790 against the religious orders of France, the abbey was suppressed. Some of the monks were martyred. Others, under the novice master, Dom Augustin de Lestrange, went into exile, initially at La Valsainte Charterhouse in Switzerland.

The French government sold the abbey as national property. After the Bourbon Restoration, de Lestrange purchased the property back in 1815. When the religious community returned, the brothers found the premises in a ruinous state. They rebuilt the monastery in its entirety and the new church was consecrated on 30 August 1832.

The abbey's reputation as a place of retreat continued. It attracted both the Count of Artois, afterwards Charles X and Louis Philippe in 1847.

In 1880 the Trappists were expelled under French laws against religious institutions, but after a couple of years, they were able to return. The monastery was entirely rebuilt under the 45th abbot, Dom Etienne Salasc; the new church was consecrated on 30 August 1895.

In 1975 the abbey was registered as a Monument historique.

== Present day ==
The buildings, in Neo-Gothic style, are still occupied by the Trappist community, under the leadership of abbot Dom Guerric Reitz-Séjotte, appointed in 2004. La Trappe Abbey directly supervises four other Trappist houses, at Bellefontaine in Anjou, Timadeuc in Brittany, Échourgnac in Dordogne, and Tre Fontane in Italy. In March 2026, the monks announced that they may depart from the abbey in 2028. A reason provided for this choice is a lack of vocations to the religious life.

== Burials ==
- Armand Jean le Bouthillier de Rancé
- Augustin de Lestrange

== See also ==
- Trappist beer
