= Nicolas Ladvocat-Billiard =

French bishop

- Church: Roman Catholic Church
- Diocese: Boulogne
- Appointed: 1677
- Predecessor: François Perrochel
- Successor: Claude Le Tonnelier de Breteuil

Personal details
- Died: April 12, 1681 Boulogne-Sur-Mer, France

Nicolas Ladvocat-Billiard (died 12 April 1681, Boulogne-Sur-Mer) was a French cleric and doctor of theology. He became grand vicar and canon of Paris before being made bishop of Boulogne in 1677, in succession to François Perrochel. He died in office and was succeeded by Claude Le Tonnelier de Breteuil.

== Sources ==
- Eugène Van Drival, Histoire des évêques de Boulogne, Boulogne-sur-Mer, 1852
