= Soligny-la-Trappe =

- Commune
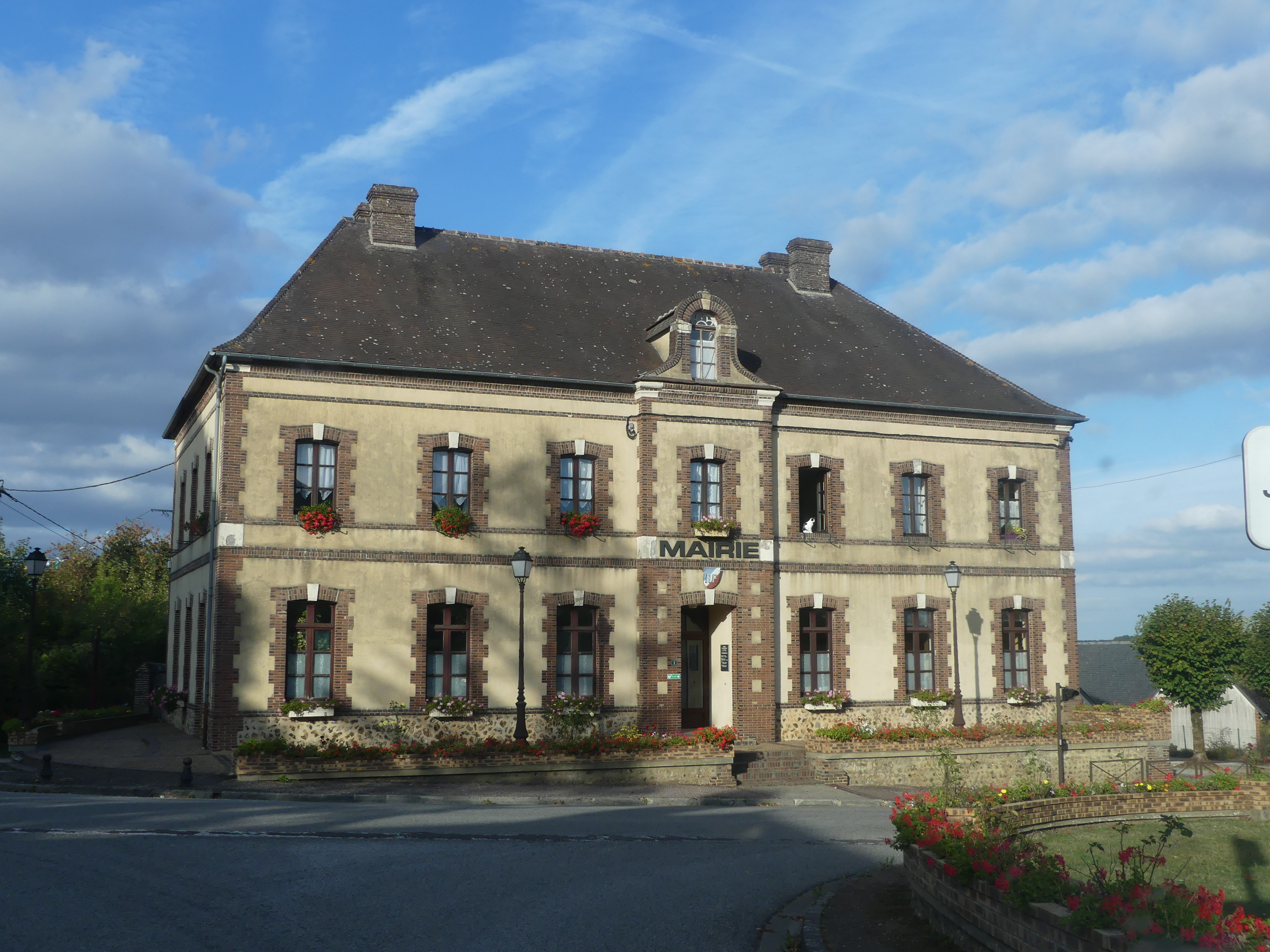
- The town hall in Soligny-la-Trappe
- Location of Soligny-la-Trappe
- Location within France Location within Normandy
- Coordinates: 48°36′56″N 0°32′11″E
- Country: France
- Region: Normandy
- Department: Orne
- Arrondissement: Mortagne-au-Perche
- Canton: Mortagne-au-Perche
- Intercommunality: Pays de Mortagne au Perche

Government
  - Mayor (2020–2026): Thierry Cortyl
- Area^{1}: 19.50 km^{2} (7.53 sq mi)
- Elevation: 267 m (876 ft)
- Highest elevation: 294 m (965 ft)
- Lowest elevation: 197 m (646 ft)
- Population (2023): 627
  - Density: 32.2/km^{2} (83.3/sq mi)
- Time zone: UTC+01:00 (CET)
  - Summer (DST): UTC+02:00 (CEST)
- INSEE/Postal code: 61475 /61380
- ^{1} French Land Register data, which excludes lakes, ponds, glaciers > 1 km^{2} (0.386 sq mi or 247 acres) and river estuaries.

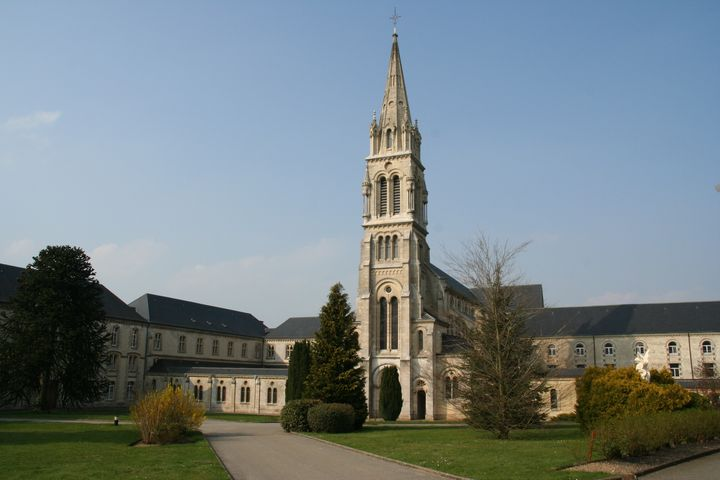
Notre-Dame de La Trappe Abbey

Soligny-la-Trappe (French pronunciation: [sɔliɲi la tʁap]) is a commune in the Orne department in north-western France.

Soligny-la-Trappe is the location of La Trappe Abbey, where the Cistercian Order of the Strict Observance, or Trappists, was founded in 1664 by a converted courtier named Armand Jean le Bouthillier de Rancé.

== Geography ==
The Commune along with another 70 communes shares part of a 47,681 hectare, Natura 2000 conservation area, called the Forêts et étangs du Perche.

The commune contains within its borders the source of the river Sarthe. Two other rivers, the Iton and L'Itonne flow through the commune. In addition a smaller watercourse passes through the commune, La Neuille Souris.

== Points of interest ==
=== National heritage sites ===
- La Trappe Abbey classified as Monument historique in 1975, has been here since 1147-1148.

== Notable people ==
- Armand Jean le Bouthillier de Rancé (1626–1700) an abbot of La Trappe Abbey and the founder of the Trappists, died here.
- François Doubin - (1933 – 2019) a French politician and cabinet minister who is buried here.

== See also ==
- Communes of the Orne department
