= Augustin-César D'Hervilly de Devise =

French cleric

Augustin-César d'Hervilly de Devise (1708 – 11 October 1742, in Château de Voisenon) was a French cleric.

d'Hervilly de Devise was from a noble family from Picardy. He became canon and archdeacon of Cambrai and provost of Lille when in 1738 he was made bishop of Boulogne and commendatory abbot of Valloires Abbey. In 1745, he was also made commendatory abbot of Ham Abbey. His secretary was canon Lesage, son of the author Alain-René Lesage.
