= François-Joseph-Gaston de Partz de Pressy =

French cleric

François-Joseph-Gaston de Partz de Pressy (22 September 1712, Équirre - 8 October 1789) was a French cleric. He was the son of François-Joseph de Partz, marquis d'Esquire, and of Jeanne Elisabeth de Beaufort. He became vicar general of Boulogne-Sur-Mer, then in 1742 bishop of Boulogne and in 1746 commendatory abbot of Ham Abbey.

== Sources ==
- Eugène Van Drival, Histoire des évêques de Boulogne, Boulogne-sur-Mer, 1852.
