= Lucilio Vanini =

Italian philosopher (1585–1619)

Lucilio "Giulio Cesare" Vanini
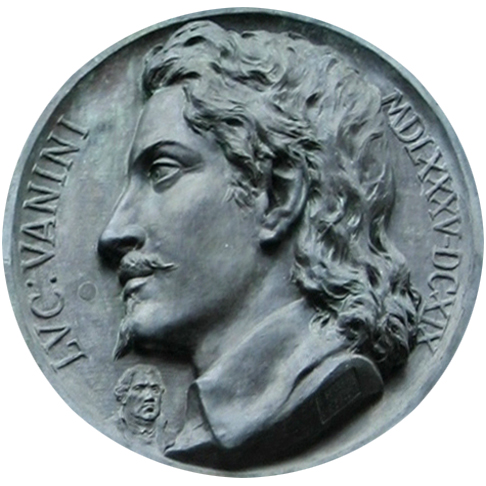
- Medallion by Ettore Ferrari on base of Giordano Bruno statue, Campo de' Fiori, Rome
- Born: 1585; Taurisano, Terra d'Otranto, Italy
- Died: 9 February 1619 (aged 33); Toulouse, France

Philosophical work
- Era: 17th-century philosophy
- Region: Western philosophy
- School: Rationalism, humanism, libertinism
- Main interests: Metaphysics, science, religion
- Notable ideas: Nomological determinism, God as a vital force in Nature (pantheism), humans and non-human apes have common ancestor; denied immortality of the soul

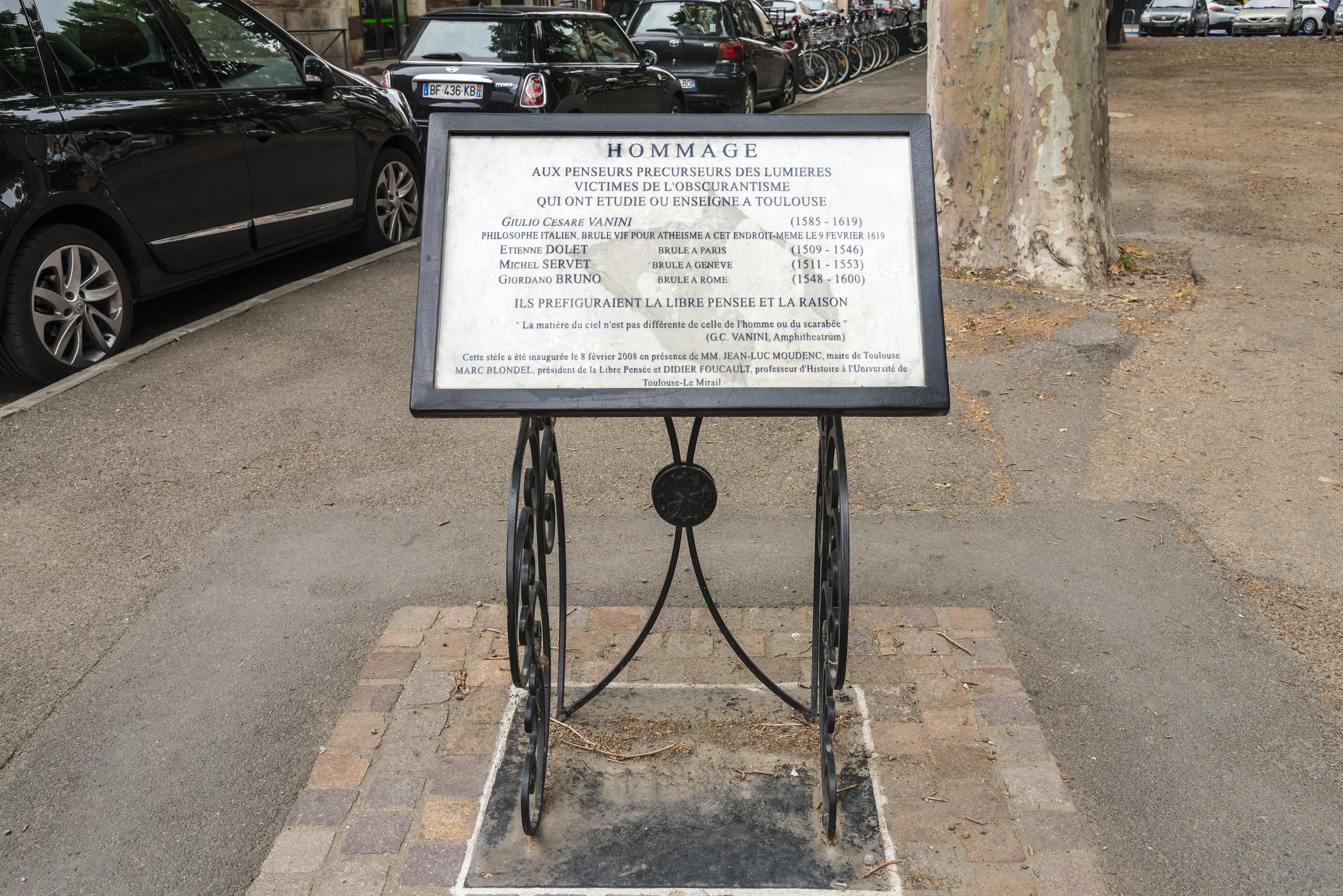
Homage to Giulio Cesare Vanini at the place of his death, the Place du Salin in Toulouse.

Lucilio Vanini (1585 – 9 February 1619), who, in his works, styled himself Giulio Cesare Vanini, was an Italian philosopher, physician and free-thinker, who was one of the first significant representatives of intellectual libertinism. He was among the first modern thinkers who viewed the universe as an entity governed by natural laws (nomological determinism). He was also an early literate proponent of biological evolution, maintaining that humans and other apes have common ancestors. He was executed in Toulouse.

Vanini was born at Taurisano near Lecce, and studied philosophy and theology at Naples. Afterwards, he applied himself to the physical studies, chiefly medicine and astronomy, which had come into vogue with the Renaissance. Like Giordano Bruno, he attacked scholasticism.

From Naples he went to Padua, where he came under the influence of the Alexandrist Pietro Pomponazzi, whom he styled his divine master. Subsequently, he led a roving life in France, Switzerland and the Low Countries, supporting himself by giving lessons and disseminating radical ideas. He was obliged to flee to England in 1612 but was imprisoned in London for 49 days.

Returning to Italy, he made an attempt to teach in Genoa but was driven again to France, where he tried to clear himself of suspicion by publishing a book against atheism: Amphitheatrum Aeternae Providentiae Divino-Magicum (1615). Though the definitions of God are somewhat pantheistic, the book served its immediate purpose. Although Vanini did not expound his true views in his first book, he did in his second: De Admirandis Naturae Reginae Deaeque Mortalium Arcanis (Paris, 1616). This was originally certified by two doctors of the Sorbonne, but was later re-examined and condemned.

Vanini then left Paris, where he had been staying as chaplain to the Marechal de Bassompierre, and began to teach in Toulouse. In November 1618, he was arrested and, after a prolonged trial, was condemned to have his tongue cut out, to be strangled at the stake and to have his body burned to ashes. The execution was carried out on 9 February 1619 by local authorities.

== Life ==
=== Early life (1585–1612) ===
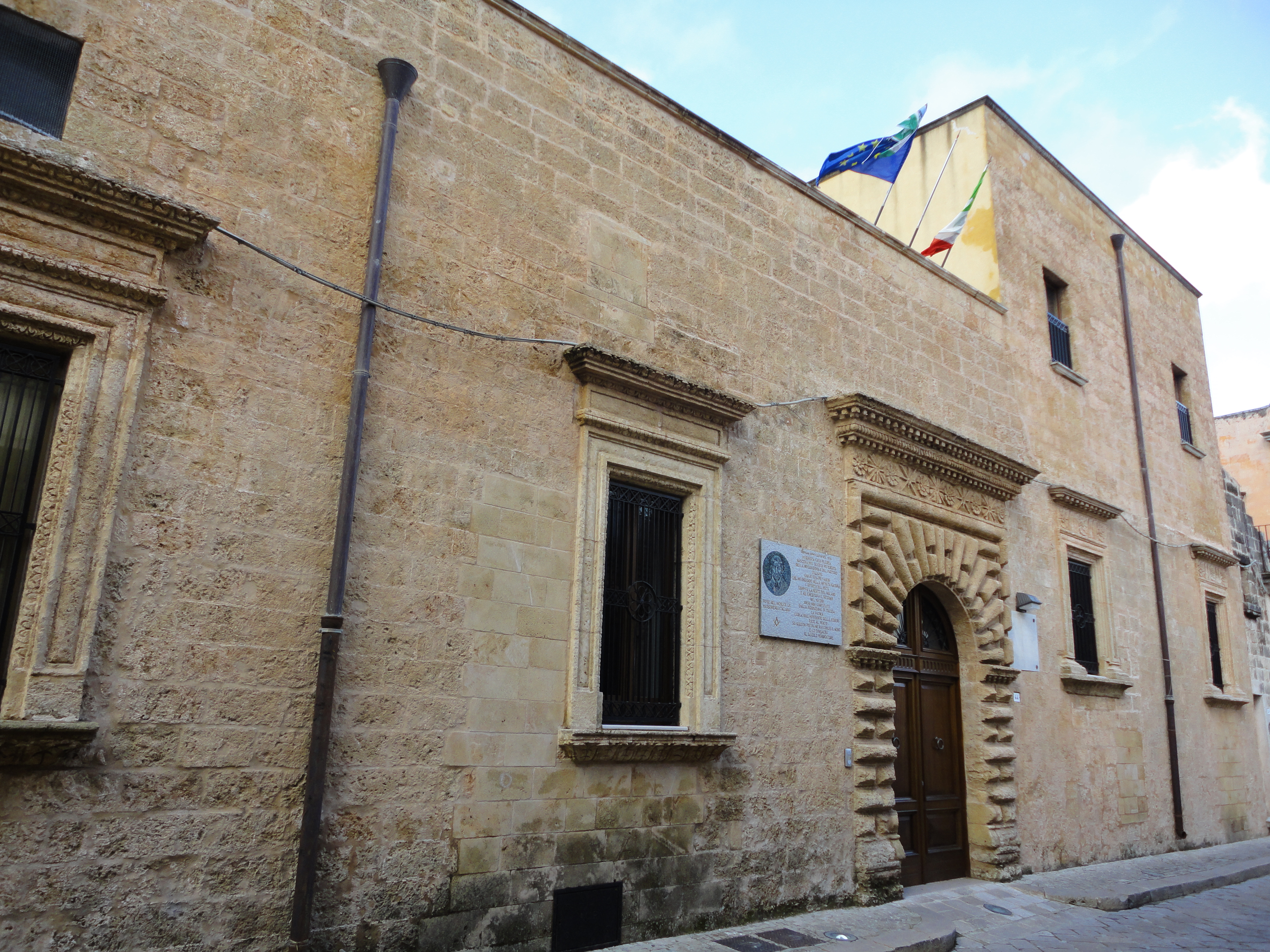
Vanini's birthplace, Taurisano

Lucilio Vanini was born in 1585 in Taurisano, Terra d'Otranto, Italy. His father was Giovan Battista Vanini, a businessman from Tresana in Tuscany, while his mother was the daughter of a man named Lopez de Noguera, a customs contractor of the Spanish royal family's lands in Bari, Terra d'Otranto, Capitanata, and Basilicata. A document dated August 1612, discovered in the Vatican Secret Archives, describes Vanini as of Apulia, which is consistent with the native land he mentions in his own works.

The government census of the population of the hamlet of Taurisano, in 1596, includes the names of Giovan Battista Vanini, his lawful son Alexander, born in 1582, and his natural son Giovan Francesco, while there is no mention of Vanini's wife or of another lawful son called Lucilio (or Giulio Cesare). In 1603, Giovan Battista Vanini is reported for the last time in Taurisano.

Lucilio Vanini entered the University of Naples in 1599. In 1603 he entered the Carmelite order, taking the name of Fra Gabriele. He earned a doctorate in canon and civil law from the University of Naples on 6 June 1606.

Afterwards, he remained in the Naples area for two years, apparently living as a friar, or alternatively he returned to Lecce and studied the new Renaissance sciences, chiefly medicine and astronomy. By now, he had assimilated much knowledge and "speaks very good Latin and with great ease, is tall and a bit thin, has brown hair, an aquiline nose, lively eyes and a pleasant and ingenious physiognomy".

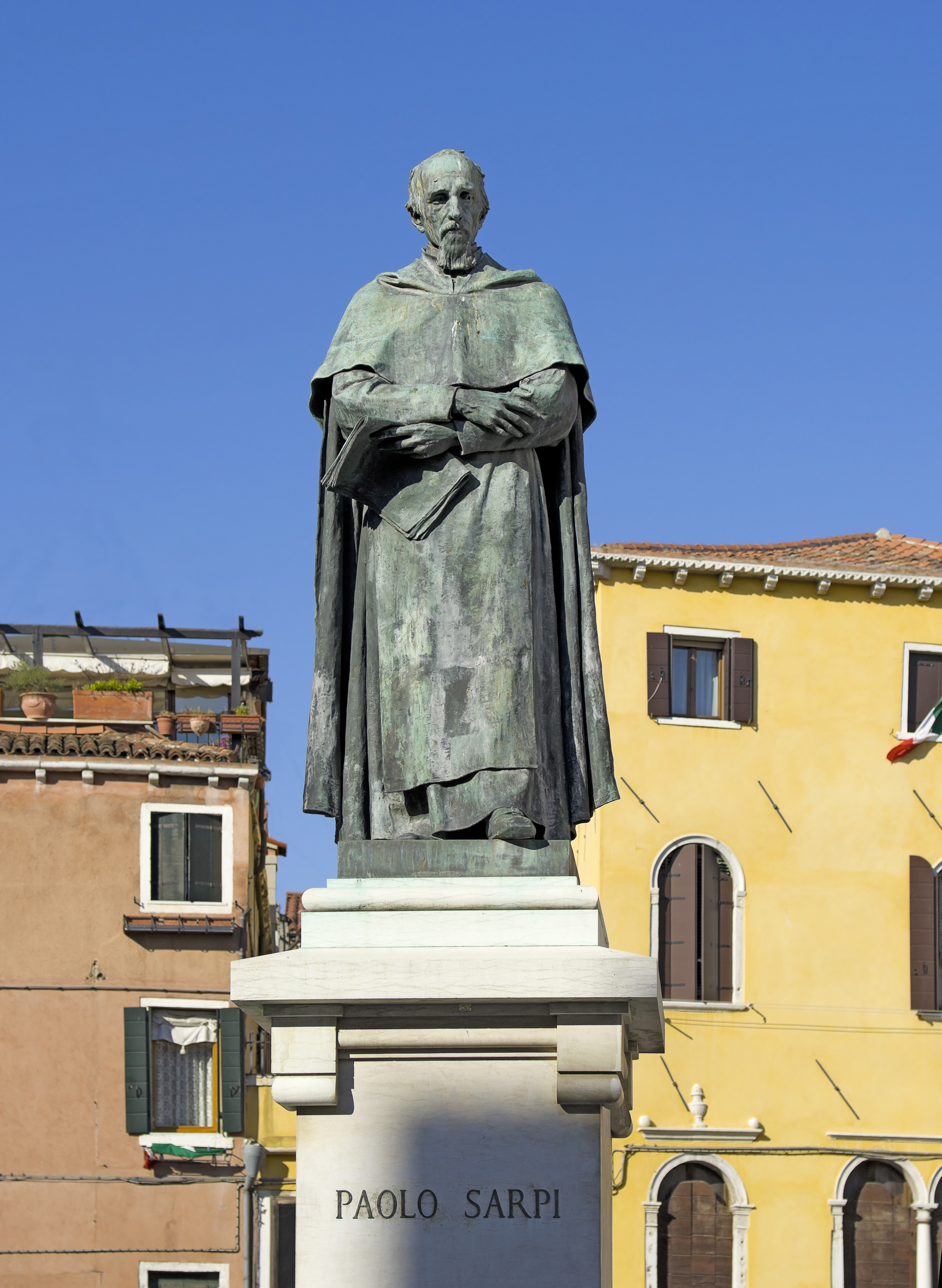
Statue of Paolo Sarpi in Venice

In (probably) 1606, Vanini's father died in Naples. Vanini, now come of age, was recognised by a court in the capital as heir of Giovan Battista and guardian of his brother Alexander. With a series of deeds and power of attorney drawn up in Naples, Vanini began to settle the financial consequences of the death of his father: selling a house he owned in Ugento, a few miles from his home country; in 1607 mandating a maternal uncle to fulfil assignments of the same type; in 1608 instructing friend Scarciglia to recover a sum and sell some goods remaining in Taurisano and held in custody by the two brothers.

In 1608, Vanini moved to Padua, a town under the rule of Venice, to study theology at that university (although there is no record of him subsequently obtaining a degree). While there, he came into contact with the group led by Paolo Sarpi that, with the support of the English embassy in Venice, fueled anti-papal polemics. In 1611 he participated in the Lenten sermons, attracting the suspicions of the religious authorities. During that period, the controversy over the 1606 interdict placed on the Republic of Venice by Pope Paul V was still raging, and Vanini showed himself unambiguously in favour of the Republic. Consequently, the Prior General of his order, Enrico Silvio, commanded him to return to Naples, where he would have been disciplined, probably severely, but instead Vanini sought refuge with the English ambassador to Venice in 1612.

=== In England (1612–1614) ===
Vanini then fled to England, along with his Genoese companion Bonaventure Genocchi. They passed through Bologna, Milan, the Swiss canton of Graubünden, and descended via the Rhine, through Germany and the Netherlands, to the North Sea coast and the English Channel, finally reaching London and the Lambeth residence of the Archbishop of Canterbury. Here, the two remained for nearly two years, hiding their true identity from their English guests. In July 1612, they both renounced their Catholic faith and embraced Anglicanism.

By 1613, however, Vanini was having doubts, so he appealed to the Pope to be allowed back into the Catholic fold, but as a secular priest rather than as a friar; the request was granted by the Pope himself. Around the start of 1614, Vanini visited the Universities of Cambridge and Oxford and confided to some acquaintances his imminent flight from England, so in January, he and Genocchi were arrested on the orders of the Archbishop of Canterbury, George Abbot. They managed to escape; however, Genocchi in February 1614 and Vanini in March. The Spanish ambassador in London and the chaplain of the embassy of the Venetian Republic were thought to have engineered their escapes. The two passed through the hands of the papal nuncio in Flanders, Guido Bentivoglio, to the papal nuncio in Paris, Roberto Ubaldini.

=== In France (1614–1618) ===
In Paris, in the summer of 1614, Vanini subscribed to the principles of the Council of Trent, to prove the sincerity of his return to the Catholic faith. He then journeyed to Italy, going first to Rome, where he had to face the difficult final stages of the process in the court of the Inquisition, then to Genoa for a few months, where he found his friend Genocchi and taught philosophy to the children of Scipio Doria for a time.

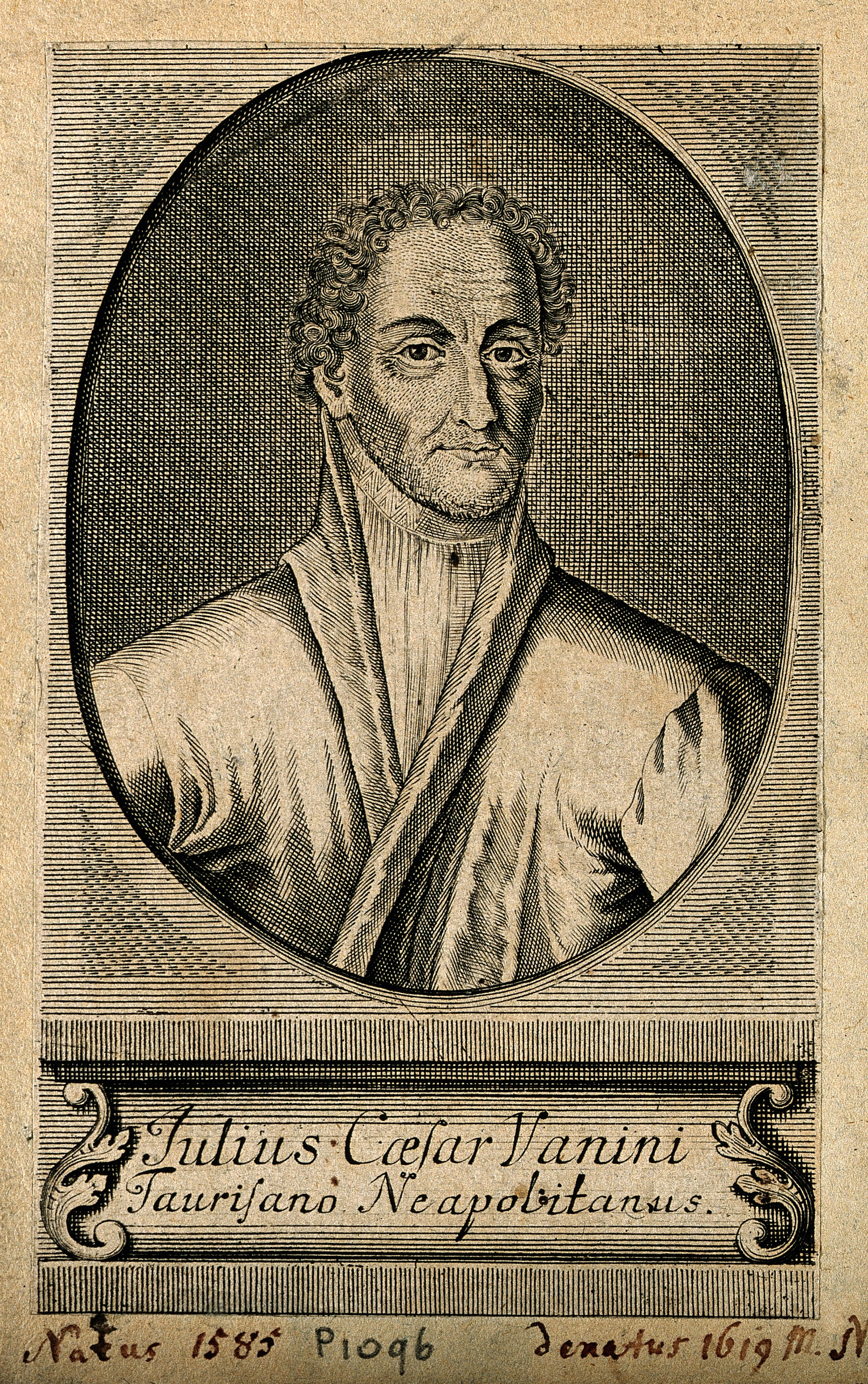
Line engraving of Lucilio (Giulio Cesare) Vanini

Despite assurances, the return of Vanini and Genocchi was not entirely peaceful; in January 1615, Genocchi was arrested by the Inquisitor of Genoa. Vanini, therefore, fearing the same fate, ran away again to France and headed to Lyon. There, in June 1615, he published Amphitheatrum, a book against atheism, which he hoped would clear his name with the Roman authorities.

A short time later, Vanini returned to Paris, where he asked Nuncio Ubaldini to intervene on his behalf with the authorities in Rome. Insufficiently assured, Vanini decided not to return to Italy, and instead cultivated connections with prestigious elements of the French nobility.

In 1616, Vanini completed the second of his two works, De Admirandis, and got it approved by two theologians at the Sorbonne. The work was published in September in Paris. It was dedicated to François de Bassompierre, a powerful man at the court of Marie de' Medici, and was printed by Adrien Périer, a Protestant. The work was immediately successful among those aristocratic circles populated by young spirits who looked with interest to the cultural and scientific innovations that came from Italy. The De Admirandis was a summa, lively and brilliant, of the new knowledge, and became a kind of "manifesto" for these cultural free spirits, giving Vanini a chance to stay safe in circles close to the French court. However, a few days after the publication of the work, the two theologians at the Sorbonne who had expressed their approval were presented to the Faculty of Theology in formal session and the outcome was a de facto ban on the movement of the text.

Now, unwelcome in England, unable to return to Italy and threatened by some circles of French Catholics, Vanini saw his room for manoeuvre shrinking and his chances of finding a stable place in French society failing. Fearing that a court case would be started against him in Paris, he fled and went into hiding at Redon Abbey in Brittany, where Abbott Arthur d'Épinay de Saint-Luc acted as his protector. But other factors gave cause for concern: in April 1617 Concino Concini, favourite of Marie de' Medici, was killed in Paris, giving rise to a wave of hostility to Italian residents at court.

=== Final year (1618–1619) ===
In the following months, a mysterious Italian, with a strange name (Pompeo Uciglio) and in possession of great knowledge but an uncertain past, appeared in some cities of Guyenne, then the Languedoc and finally Toulouse. Duke Henri II de Montmorency, protector of esprits forts of the time, was the governor of this region and seemed to grant protection to the fugitive, who still continued to keep carefully hidden.

The presence of this mysterious character in Toulouse did not, however, pass unnoticed and attracted the suspicions of the authorities. In August 1618, he was apprehended and interrogated. In February 1619, the Parlement of Toulouse found him guilty of atheism and blasphemy and, in accordance with the regulations of the time, his tongue was cut out, he was strangled, and his body was burned. After the execution, it emerged that the stranger was in fact Vanini.

== Works ==
=== Amphitheatrum ===
Amphitheatrum Aeternae Providentiae divino-magicum, christiano-physicum, necnon astrologo-catholicum adversus veteres philosophos, atheos, epicureos, peripateticos et stoicos (possible translation: "Amphitheatre of Eternal Providence – Religio-magical, Christian-physical and Astrologico-Catholic – against the Ancient Philosophers, Atheists, Epicureans, Peripatetics and Stoics"), published in Lyon in 1615, consists of 50 exercises, which aim to demonstrate the existence of God, to define His essence, to describe His providence and to examine or refute the opinions of Pythagoras, Protagoras, Cicero, Boethius, Thomas Aquinas, the Epicureans, Aristotle, Averroes, Gerolamo Cardano, the Peripatetics, the Stoics, etc. on this subject.

=== De Admirandis ===
De Admirandis Naturae Reginae Deaeque Mortalium Arcanis (possible translation: "On the Marvellous Secrets of Nature, the Queen and Goddess of Mortals"), printed in Paris in 1616 by publisher Adrien Périer, is divided into four books:

1. On Sky and Air
2. On Water and Land
3. On Animals and Passions
4. On Non-Christian Religions

These contain a total of 60 dialogues (but really only 59, as dialogue XXXV is absent), which take place between the author, in the role of disseminator of knowledge, and an imaginary Alessandro, who urges his interlocutor to list and explain the mysteries of nature found around and within man.

In a mixture of reinterpretation of ancient knowledge and the dissemination of new scientific and religious theories, the protagonist discusses: the material, figure, colour, form, energy and eternity of heaven; the motion and the central pole of the heavens; the sun, the moon, the stars; fire; comets and rainbows; lightning, snow and rain; the motion and rest of projectiles in the air; the impulsion of mortars and crossbows; winds and breezes; corrupt airs; the element of water; the birth of the rivers; the rising of the Nile; the extent and saltiness of the sea; the roar and the motion of the water; the motion of projectiles; the creation of islands and mountains, as well as the cause of earthquakes; the genesis, root and colour of the gems, as well as spots of stones; life, food, and the death of the stones; the strength of the magnet to attract iron and its direction toward the Earth's poles; plants; the explanation to be given to certain phenomena of everyday life; semen; the reproduction, nature, respiration and nutrition of fish; the reproduction of birds; the reproduction of bees; the first generation of man; stains contracted by children in the womb; the generation of male and female; parts of monsters; the faces of children covered by larvae; the growth of man; the length of human life; sight; hearing; smell; taste; touch and tickle; the affections of man; God; appearances in the air; oracles; the Sibyls; the possessed; sacred images of the pagans; augurs; the miraculous healing of diseases reported in pagan times; the resurrection of the dead; witchcraft; dreams.

== Thought ==
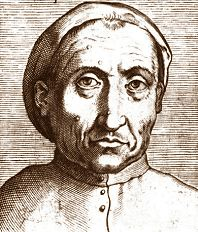
Pietro Pomponazzi

The naturalistic interpretation of supernatural phenomena that Pietro Pomponazzi – called by Vanini magister meus, divinus praeceptor meus, nostri seculi Philosophorum princeps – had given in the early 16th century in his treatise De Incantationibus was summarised in De Admirandis Naturae, where, in simple and elegant prose, Vanini also referred to Gerolamo Cardano, Julius Caesar Scaliger and other 16th-century thinkers.

"God acts on sublunary beings [humans] using the sky as a tool": hence the natural and rational explanation of the allegedly supernatural phenomena, since even astrology was considered a science. God may use such phenomena to warn the people, and especially rulers, of danger. But the real origin of supernatural phenomena is, for Vanini, the human imagination, which can sometimes change the appearance of external reality. For the ecclesiastical "impostors" that promulgate false beliefs to gain wealth and power, and rulers interested in dominating the people, according to Vanini, "all religious things are false and fake principles to teach the naive populace that, when reason cannot be reached, at least practice religion".

Following Pietro Pomponazzi and Simone Porzio in their interpretation of the Aristotelian texts and the commentary thereon by Alexander of Aphrodisias, Vanini denied the immortality of the soul and attacked the Aristotelian cosmos-view. Like Bruno, he denied the difference between the everyday world and the celestial world, saying that both are composed of the same corruptible material. He disputed, in the physical and biological world, finality and the hylomorphic Aristotelian doctrine, and, reconnecting Epicureanism with Lucretius, prepared a new mechanistic-materialistic description of the universe where bodies are likened to a watch, and conceived a first form of universal transformation of living species. He agreed with the Aristotelian eternity of the world, especially considering the temporal aspect, but affirmed the rotation of the earth and appeared to reject the Ptolemaic system in favour of the heliocentric/Copernican system.

If the first editor of his works, Luigi Corvaglia, and historian Guido De Ruggiero, unjustly, considered his writings simply "a centone devoid of originality and scientific seriousness", the Jesuit priest François Garasse, far more worried about the consequences of the spread of his writings, judged them "a work of such most pernicious atheism as was never released in the last hundred years". The works of Vanini have been extensively reviewed and revalued by contemporary critics, revealing originality and insights (metaphysical, physical, biological) sometimes well ahead of their time.

Since Vanini, in his works, obscured his ideas, a typical ploy at the time to avoid serious conflicts with the religious and political authorities, the interpretation of his thought is difficult. However, in the history of philosophy, he has the image of an unbeliever or even an atheist. Considered as one of the fathers of libertinism, he was regarded as a lost soul by conventional Christians, despite having written a defence of the Council of Trent.

To understand the origins of Vanini's thought, one has to look to his cultural background, which was fairly typical of the Renaissance, with a prevalence of elements of Averroistic Aristotelianism but with strong elements of mysticism and Neo-Platonism. On the other hand, he drew from Nicholas of Cusa typical pantheistic elements, similar to those which are also found in Giordano Bruno, but more materialistic. His worldview was based on the eternity of matter, and of a God in nature as a "force" that shapes, orders and directs. All forms of life, he thought, had originated spontaneously from the earth itself as their creator.

Vanini was considered an atheist, but his first work, published in Lyon in 1615, Amphitheatrum, indicates otherwise. As a precursor of libertinism, there are many elements that make his teaching close to the thought of the unknown author of the Treatise of the Three Impostors, also a pantheist. Vanini thought in fact that the creators of the three monotheistic religions, Moses, Jesus and Muhammad, were nothing but impostors.

In De Admirandis are found themes from Amphitheatrum, with refinements and developments that make it his masterpiece and the summary of his philosophy. Denying creation from nothing and the immortality of the soul, he saw God in Nature as its driving force and vital force, both eternal. The stars of heaven he considered a kind of intermediary between God and Nature. The true religion is therefore a "religion of Nature" that does not deny God but considers Him a spirit-force.

The thought of Vanini is quite fragmented and also reflects the complexity of its origins, as he was a religious figure, a naturalist, but also a doctor and, in part, a magician. What characterises the prose is the vehemently anti-clerical sentiment. Among the original aspects of his thinking there is a kind of anticipation of Darwinism, because, after a first half in which he argues that the animal species arise by spontaneous generation from the earth, in the second part he seems convinced that they can be transformed into each other and that man comes from "animals related to man, such as the Barbary apes, the monkeys and apes in general".

== Reputation ==
In 1623, two works appeared that started the myth of Vanini the atheist: La doctrine curieuse des beaux esprits de ce temps ... of Jesuit François Garasse, and Quaestiones celeberrimae in Genesim cum accurata explicatione ..., of Father Marin Mersenne. The two works, though, instead of turning off the voice of the philosopher, boosted it in an environment that was obviously ready to receive, discuss and recognise the validity of his claims.

In that same year, the name of Vanini was again brought to the attention of French culture during the sensational trial of the poet Théophile de Viau, whose outlook had striking similarities with Vaninian thought.

In 1624, the monk Marin Mersenne returned to attacking the philosophy of Vanini, analysing some statements in chapter X of his L'Impiétè des Déistes, Athées et Libertins de ce temps, combatuë, et renversee de point en point par raisons tirées de la Philosophie, et de la Theologie, in which the theologian expresses his judgment of the works of Girolamo Cardano and Giordano Bruno.

Even Leibniz, another opponent of libertinism, was strongly opposed to Vanini, considering him evil, a fool and a charlatan.

English intellectuals showed interest in the ideas of Vanini, and it was especially with the work of Charles Blount that Vanini's ideas entered English culture, becoming a cornerstone of libertinism and deism in seventeenth-century England.

An unpublished manuscript in the municipal library of Avignon preserves Observations sur Lucilio Vanini written by Joseph Louis Dominique de Cambis, Marquis de Velleron, but provides only uncertain information on the philosopher, largely rectified by recent studies. In this same period, a manuscript copy of the Amphitheatrum, was made or commissioned by Joseph Uriot, which later came to the library of the Duke of Württemberg; currently it is in the Württembergische Landesbibliothek in Stuttgart. Another manuscript copy of the same work is in the Staats und Universitätbibliothek in Hamburg, reflecting the continued interest in the thought of Vanini in German culture.

Pierre Bayle, in his Various Thoughts on the Occasion of a Comet, cited Vanini as an example of a learned atheist, alongside the ancient figures of Diagoras, Theodorus, and Euhemerus.

In 1730, the press in London was given a biography of Vanini with an extract of his works, entitled The life of Lucilio (alias Julius Caesar) Vanini, burnt for atheism at Toulouse. With an abstract of his writings. The work debates Vanini's ideas, recognising much merit.

Arthur Schopenhauer's 1839 essay 'On the Freedom of the Will' includes Vanini among his account of predecessors who also came to the same conclusion as that of his essay, which Schopenhauer expressed as follows: "Everything that happens, from the greatest to the smallest, happens necessarily."

== Sources ==
- La Vie et L'Œuvre de J.C Vanini, Princes des Libertins mort a Toulouse sur le bucher en 1619, Emile Namer, 1980.
