= Les Trois Vérités =

Les Trois Vérités (The Three Truths) is a 1594 book by Pierre Charron. The three truths are the existence of God, the truth of Christianity, and the truth of Catholicism.
