= Claude-André Dormy =

Claude-André Dormy (died 15 February 1599, in Boulogne-Sur-Mer) was the first bishop of Boulogne. He was named to the see in 1567, but only took possession of it in 1570 due to tensions in Boulogne caused by the Huguenots.

He was brought into the Catholic League by the Guise family and kept away from his diocese, but returned to it when Henry IV of France renounced Protestantism in 1593. He was succeeded as bishop by his nephew Claude Dormy.

== Sources ==
- Eugène Van Drival, Histoire des évêques de Boulogne, Boulogne-sur-Mer, 1852
