= Théophile de Viau =

French poet (1590–1626)

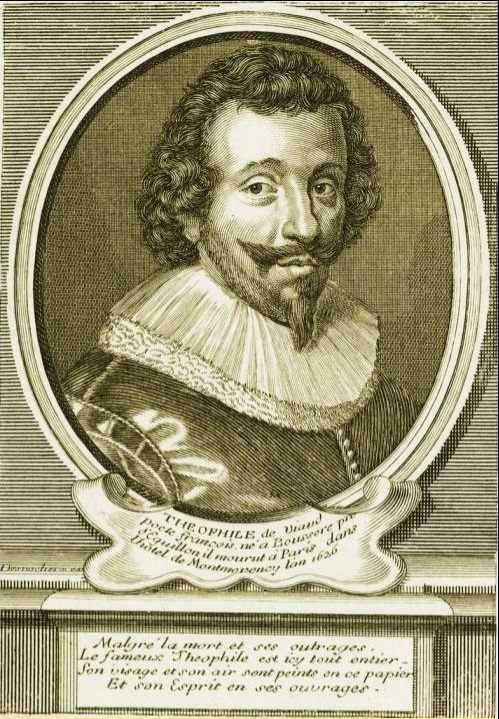
Théophile de Viau

Théophile de Viau (1590 – 25 September 1626) was a French Baroque poet and dramatist.

== Life ==
Born at Clairac, near Agen in the Lot-et-Garonne and raised as a Huguenot, Théophile de Viau participated in the Huguenot rebellions in Guyenne from 1615–16 in the service of the Comte de Candale. After the war, he was pardoned and became a brilliant young poet in the royal court. Théophile came into contact with the epicurean ideas of Italian philosopher Lucilio Vanini, which questioned the immortality of the soul. (Vanini was accused of heresy and of practising magic, and after having his tongue cut out, was strangled and his corpse burned in Toulouse in 1619.)

Because of his heretical views and his libertine lifestyle, de Viau was banished from France in 1619 and travelled in England, though he returned to the court in 1620. In 1622 a collection of licentious poems, Le Parnasse satyrique, was published under his name, although many of the poems were written by others.

However, de Viau was denounced by the Jesuits in 1623 on moral charges, for his bisexuality. The Jesuit writer Francis Garasse published his La Doctrine curieuse which attacked the poet, among others. De Viau was imprisoned and sentenced to appear barefoot before Notre-Dame in Paris to be burned alive. While de Viau was in hiding, the sentence was carried out in effigy, but the poet was eventually caught in flight toward England and put in the Conciergerie prison in Paris for almost two years. The trial led to debates among scholars and writers, and 55 pamphlets were published both for and against de Viau. His sentence was changed to permanent banishment and de Viau spent the remaining months of his life in Chantilly under the protection of the Henri de Montmorency, 4th Duke of Montmorency, before dying in Paris in 1626.

== Writings ==
De Viau's wrote satirical poems, sonnets, odes and elegies. His works include one play, Les Amours tragiques de Pyrame et Thisbé (performed in 1621), the tragic love story of Pyramus and Thisbe which ends in a double suicide.

He wrote Fragment d'une histoire comique (English: Fragment of a Comic Novel, 1623), in which he expressed his literary tastes. He was not a supporter of "the metaphoric excess and lofty erudition" of his contemporaries. But he also thought "sterile" the constraints proposed by would-be reformers such as François de Malherbe. This disregard for constraints probably added to his reputation as a non-conformist.

De Viau's poetic style refused the logical and classicist constraints of François de Malherbe and remained attached to the emotional and the baroque images of the late Renaissance, such as in his ode Un corbeau devant moi croasse (A crow before me caws), which paints a fantastic scene of thunder, serpents and fire (much like a painting by Salvator Rosa). Two of his poems are melancholy pleas to the king on the subject of his incarceration or exile, and this tone of sadness is also present in his ode On Solitide which mixes classical motifs with an elegy about the poet in the midst of a forest.

Théophile de Viau was "rediscovered" by the French Romantics in the 19th century.

== Sources ==
- This article incorporates text from a publication now in the public domain: Chisholm, Hugh, ed. (1911). "Théophile". Encyclopædia Britannica. Vol. 26 (11th ed.). Cambridge University Press. p. 786.
- Stedman, Allison (2012), Rococo Fiction in France, 1600-1715: Seditious Frivolity, Rowman & Littlefield, ISBN 978-1611484366
- Dandrey, Patrick, ed. Dictionnaire des lettres françaises: Le XVIIe siècle. Collection: La Pochothèque. Paris: Fayard, 1996.
- Allem, Maurice, ed. Anthologie poétique française: XVIIe siècle. Paris: Garnier Frères, 1966.
- Oeuvre poétique complete de Théophile de Viau.
