= Taurisano =

- Comune
- Comune di Taurisano
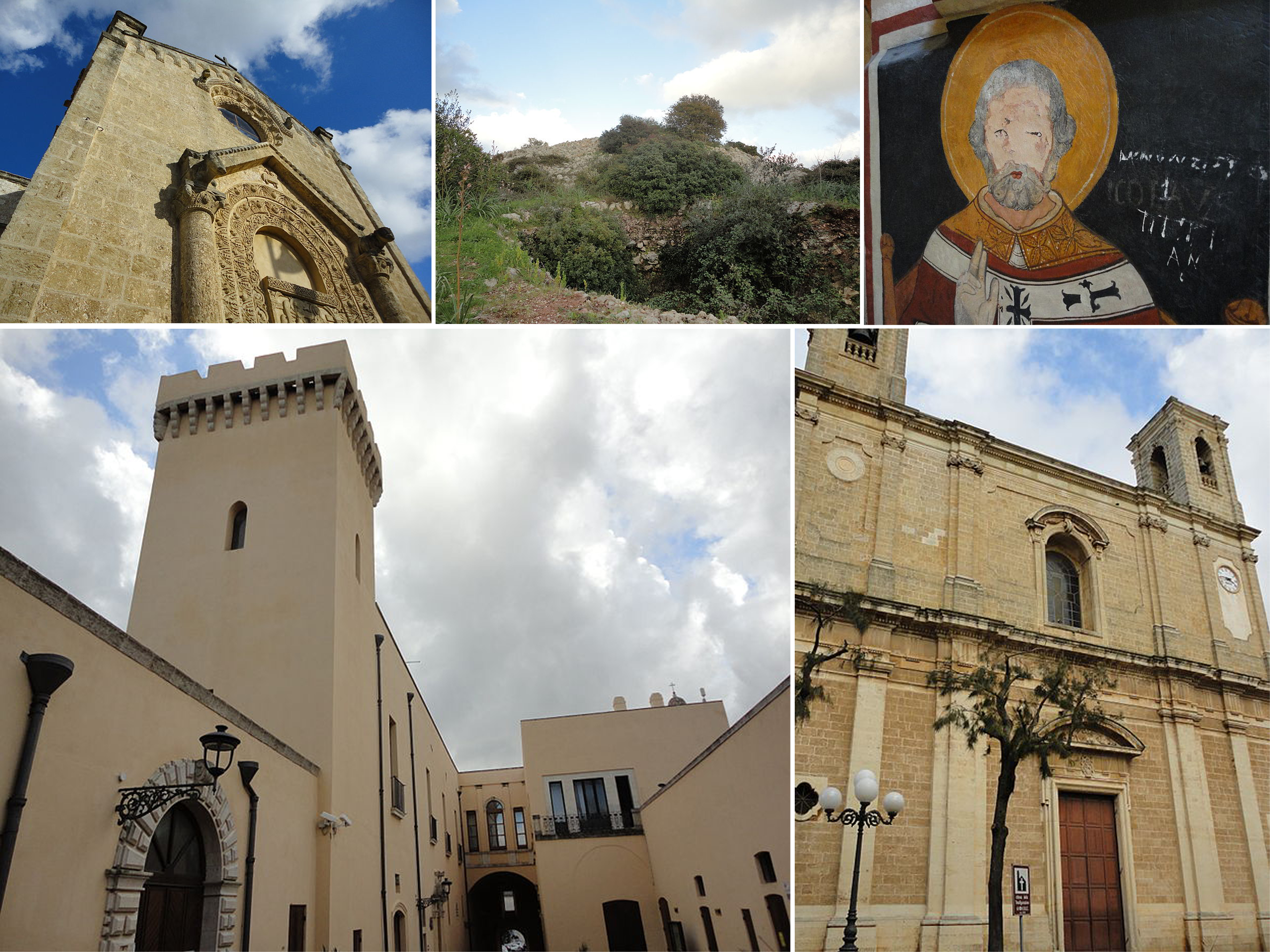
- Top left: Church of Santa Maria di Strada, Top middle: Megalith of Specchia Silva and Sanjetti Menhir, Top right: Painting picture of Santa Maria Strada in Trasfiguraziane Cathedral, Bottom left: Taurisano Ducale Palace, Bottom right: Trasfiguraziane Cathedral

- Coat of arms

- Location within Italy Location within Apulia
- Coordinates: 39°57′N 18°10′E
- Country: Italy
- Region: Apulia
- Province: Lecce (LE)

Government
  - Mayor: Raffaele Stasi

Area
  - Total: 23.68 km^{2} (9.14 sq mi)
- Elevation: 110 m (360 ft)

Population (31 March 2012)
  - Total: 12,668
  - Density: 535.0/km^{2} (1,386/sq mi)
- Demonym: Taurisanesi
- Time zone: UTC+1 (CET)
  - Summer (DST): UTC+2 (CEST)
- Postal code: 73056
- Dialing code: 0833
- Patron saint: St. Stephen
- Saint day: 3 August
- Website: Official website

Taurisano (Salentino: Taurisanu) is a town and comune in the province of Lecce, in the Apulia region of south-east Italy. It is located in the Salento area. Nearby towns are Acquarica del Capo, Casarano, Ruffano and Ugento.

The town of Taurisano is the place of birth of the philosopher Giulio Cesare Vanini.

== Main sights ==
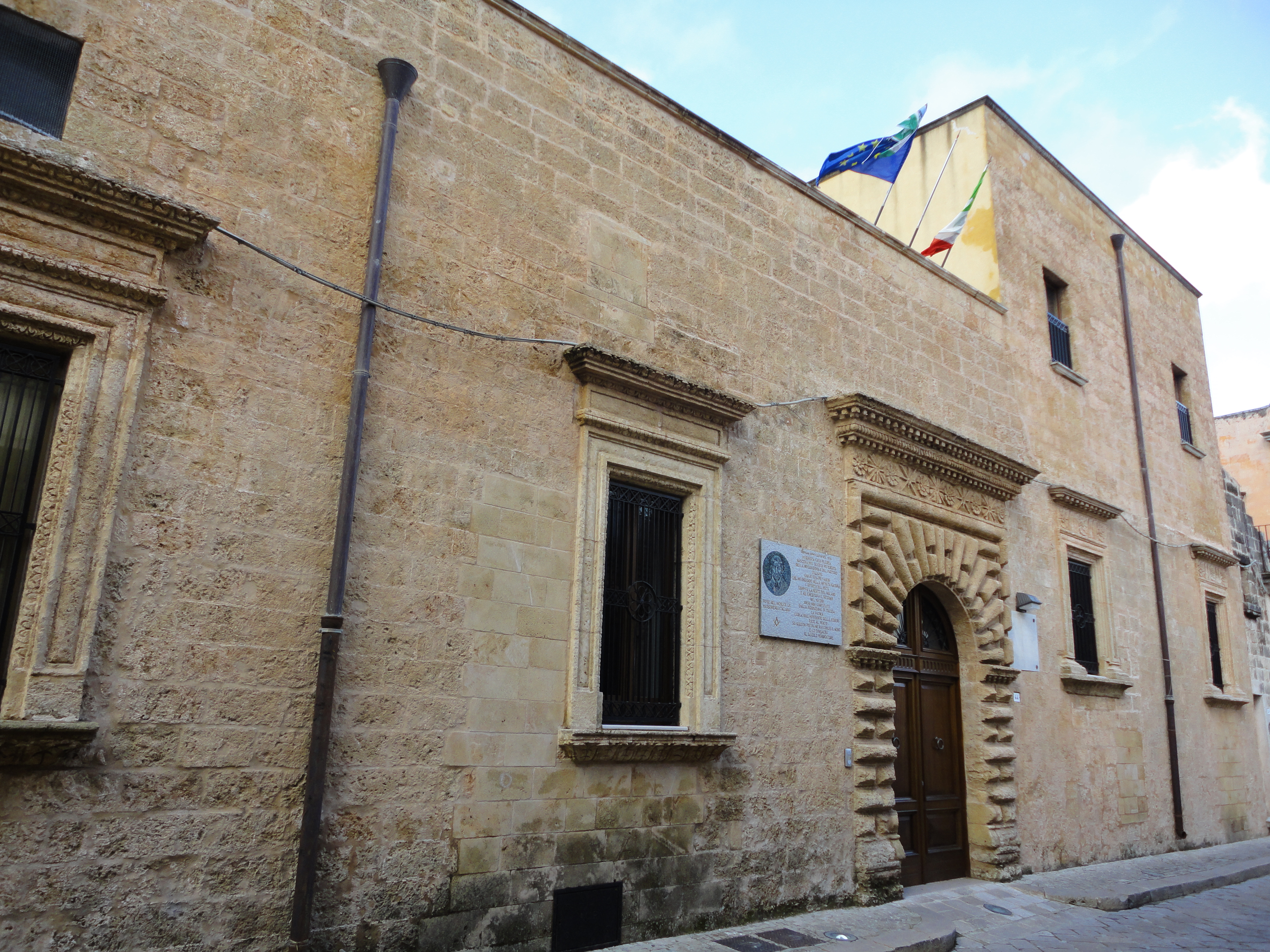
Native house of Giulio Cesare Vanini

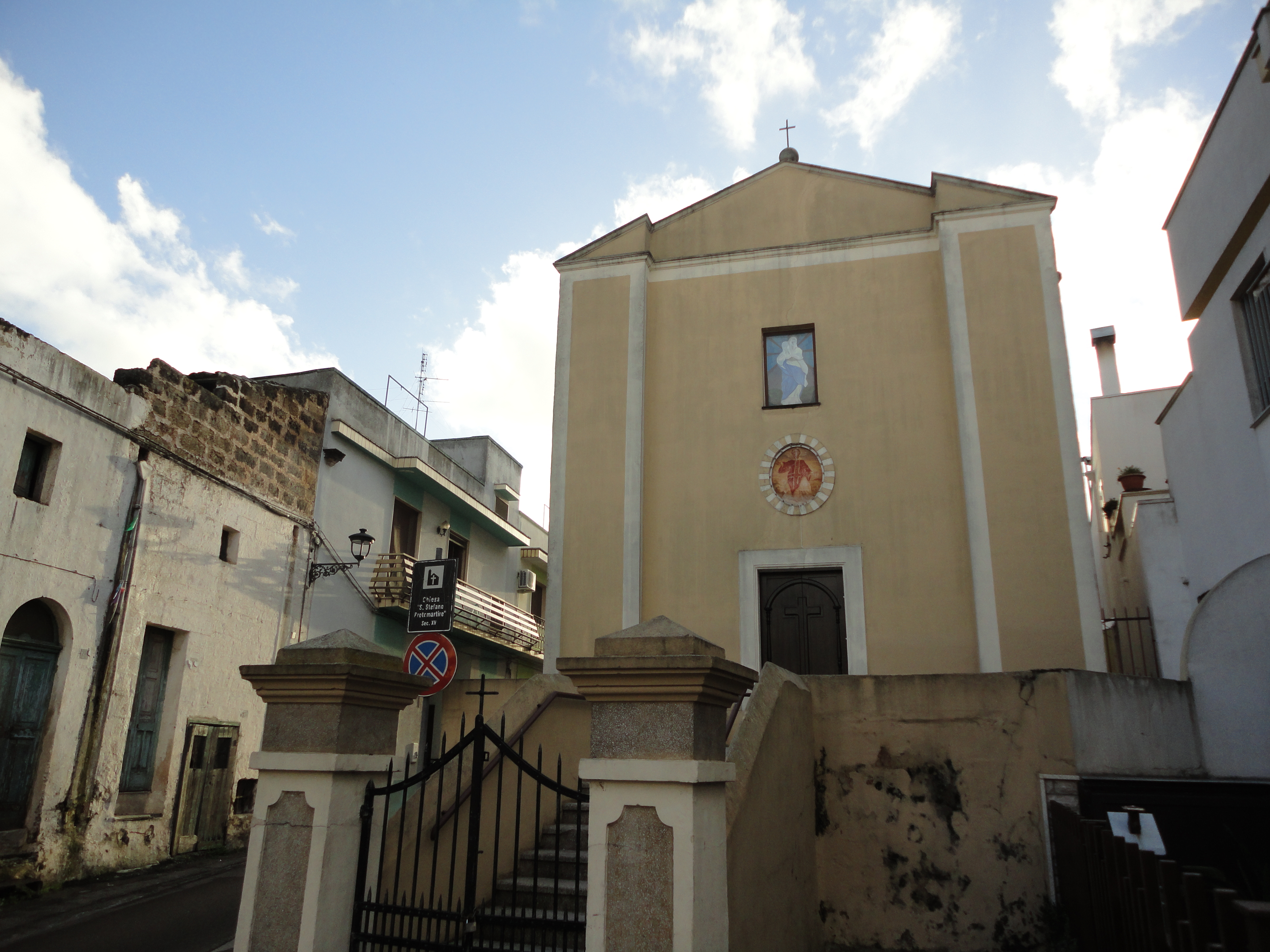
Church of Santo Stefano Protomartire

- Church of Santa Maria di Strada, in Apulian-Romanesque style (mid-13th/early 14th centuries). The façade has a portal sided by two plinths, which support two crouching animals (a bull and a lion); the architrave has a bas-relief depicting the Annunciation. At the side, under the bell-gable, is a Byzantine sundial with the time written both in Latin and Greek characters.
- Church of Santo Stefano Protomartire (15th century, but later rebuilt in 1796).
- Church of San Nicola della Consolata (1733), annexed to the Ducal Palace. The latter was completed in 1770 above an Angevine 13th-century castle, and has a 16th-century tower with Guelph merlons.
- Remains of the Byzantine Chapel of San Donato (7th-8th centuries)
- Megalith of Specchia Silva and Sanjetti Menhir
