= Francis Garasse =

French Jesuit

Francis Garasse (French: François Garasse; 1585-1631) was a French Jesuit, preacher, polemicist and writer. He was the Jesuitical writer, notable, for his wit and buffoonery, but more distinguished himself by his writings which were bold, licentious, scurrilous, and produced much controversy.

This controversial and satiric writer is chiefly remembered as the first author of irreconcilable enmity between Jesuits and Jansenists, in the church of Rome, with his publication entitled La Somme Theologique des Verites Capitales de la Religion Chretienne (Theological Summary of the Capital Truths of the Christian Religion).

He is also known for intemperate attacks on other theologians and thinkers, including Lucilio Vanini and Pierre Charron, whom he called athée et le patriarche des esprits forts.

== Biography ==
He was born at Angoulême in 1585. He entered the Jesuits' college at the age of fifteen in 1600. At the Jesuit Collège Ste. Marthe in Poitiers in 1607-8, he taught Jean-Louis Guez de Balzac. In 1611, he published a book of elegies entitled Elegiarum de funesta morte Henrici magni liber singularis, on the death of Henry IV of France, and Sacra Rhemensia Carolina Heroica nomine Collegii Pictavensis oblata Ludov. XIII. Regi Christianissimo in sua inauguratione, a poem in heroic verse addressed to Louis XIII, on his inauguration.

He soon became an eloquent and popular preacher in the chief cities of France, but he aspired to the public admiration by the force and consequence of his writings. In his style, he had a peculiar turn for the wit than in vogue; accordingly, made deep impressions on his audience. Later, under a feigned name, as a defence of the Jesuits against their enemies, he published Andrew Schioppii Casparis fratris horoscopus (The Horoscope of Anti-Coton) in 1614, and in 1615, he published Andres Schioppii Casparis fratris Elixir Calvinisticum (The Calvinistic Elixir). Through these [both] publications, he was scurrilous and violent in his style and were vitiated by buffoonery.

He published two exaggerated panegyrics; one - Oraisou L'Andrese de Nesmond premier President du Parlement de Bourdeaux, in 1616, when then president died, and two - Colossus Henrico Magno in ponte novo positus, Carmen, in 1617. In 1617, he also published a satire entitled Le banquet des Playdoiers de Mr. Servin, par Charles de l'Espinoell,, a virulent attack on magistrate Servin.

In 1618, he became the father of his order, and for few years lectured the public in support of faith and against the infidels. And over the years, he published several treaties with similar strain of buffoonery, wit, and virulent attacks.

Garasse continued his writings with the publication of La Doctrine curieuse in 1623, which attacked the poet Theophile de Viau, among others.

In 1625, he published La Somme Theologique des Verites Capitales de la Religion Chrestienne (Theological Summary of the Capital Truths of the Christian Religion), which raised serious dissension and hatred between the Jesuits and Jansenists. The book was attacked in 1626 by abbot of St. Cyran and the rector of the Sorbonne complained to his society about the evil tendencies of a composition which recommended heretical opinions and prodigious number of falsifications of Scripture and the fathers. Though Garasse was supported initially by Jesuits, he was banished to one of their houses away from Paris. Despite this, the enmity between both the orders continued.

He died at Poictiers, from plague caught while tending the sick, at the age of 46 in 1631.

== Works ==
- Elegiarum de funesta morte Henrici magni liber singularis in 1611.
- Sacra Rhemensia Carolina Heroica nomine Collegii Pictavensis oblata Ludov. XIII. Regi Christianissimo in sua inauguratione in 1611.
- De la.Resemblance de la lumiere du Soleil & de la Justice in 1612.
- Les champs Elysiens pour la Reception du Roy Louis XIII. lors qu‘il entroit a Bourdeaux a l’occasion de son Marriage in 1612.
- Andres Schioppii Casparis fratris horoscopus in 1614.
- Andres Schioppii Casparis fratris Elixir Calvinisticum in 1615.
- Oraisou L'Andrese de Nesmond premier President du Parlement de Bourdeaux in 1616.
- Colossus Henrico Magno in ponte novo positus, Carmen in 1617.
- Le banquet des Playdoiers de Mr. Servin, par Charles de PEspinoell in 1617.
- Le Rabelais Reforme Par Les Ministres in 1619.
- La Doctrine curieuse des beaux esprits de ce temps in 1628.
- La Somme Theologique des verites capitales de la religion Chretienne in 1625.
- Histoire des Jesuits de Paris Pendant Trois Annees (1624-1626)
- Mémoires de Garasse (François); de la compagnie de Jesus
- Ludouico 13
- L’Abus descouvert en la censure pretendue des textes de l’Escriture saincte
- Les recherches des Recherches
- La Royalle Reception de leurs Majestez
