= Claude Dormy =

French bishop (c. 1562 – 1626)

Claude Dormy (c. 1562 – 30 November 1626 in Paris) was a French Roman Catholic priest and bishop of Boulogne-sur-Mer from 1600 until his death. He was the nephew of Claude-André Dormy, who had also been bishop of Boulogne.

== Life ==
He was a monk of Cluny Abbey and prior of Saint-Martin-des-Champs Priory. During his time as bishop he allowed the Capuchins to set up a monastery in Boulogne, laying the foundation stone of their church in 1618. He also set up an Ursuline monastery in the city in 1624.

== Sources ==
- Eugène Van Drival, Histoire des évêques de Boulogne, Boulogne-sur-Mer, 1852
