= Antoine-Girard de La Bournat =

Antoine-Girard de La Bournat (1656, Clermont - 8 March 1702) was a French cleric and a doctor at the Sorbonne.

King Louis XIV put him in charge of educating the king's legitimated son Louis Alexandre, Count of Toulouse. He was already abbot of Pontlevoy Abbey when he was made bishop of Toul in 1697. He was also made bishop of Boulogne and bishop of Poitiers, both in 1698.

== Sources ==
- Eugène Van Drival, Histoire des évêques de Boulogne, Boulogne-sur-Mer, 1852
