= François Perrochel =

François Perrochel (8 July 1602, in Paris – 8 April 1682, in Boulogne-Sur-Mer) was a French cleric.

He was the son of Charles Perrochel, grand audiencier of France, and his wife Marie Gibercour. He was already abbot of Saint-Crépin et Crespinien de Soissons when he was made bishop of Boulogne in 1643. He founded a Minims convent there. He resigned from his bishopric in 1675 and was succeeded there by Nicolas Ladvocat-Billiard.

== Sources ==
- Eugène Van Drival, Histoire des évêques de Boulogne, Boulogne-sur-Mer, 1852
