= Bertrand d'Eschaud =

French cleric and politician

- Archbishop of Tours
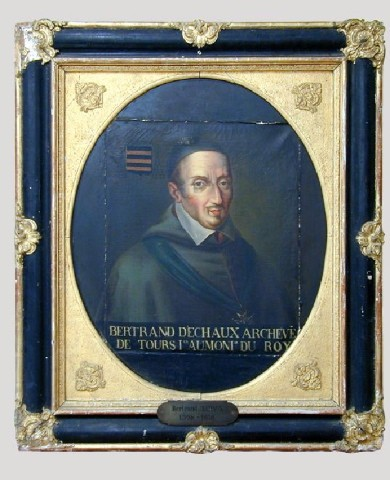
- Native name: Bertrand Etxautz
- Church: Catholic Church
- Archdiocese: Archdiocese of Tours
- In office: 26 June 1617 – 21 May 1641
- Predecessor: François de la Guesle
- Successor: Victor Le Bouthillier
- Previous post: Bishop of Bayonne (1599-1617)

Personal details
- Born: 1556/1557 Baigorri, Lower Navarre, Kingdom of France
- Died: 21 May 1641 (aged 84–85) Tours, Touraine, Kingdom of France

Bertrand d'Eschaud, d'Echaux, Etchauz, or des Chaux (1556 or 1557, Saint-Étienne-de-Baïgorry – 21 May 1641) was a French cleric and politician. He was bishop of Bayonne (1599-1617), then archbishop of Tours (1617-1641). Prélat-commandeur du Saint-Esprit, Bertrand d'Eschaud was almoner to his kinsman Henry IV of France and then to Louis XIII, who promised him a cardinalate.

== Bibliography ==
- J. de Jaurgain, Revue de Béarn, Navarre et Lannes, t. III, 1885, p. 15.
