= Victor Le Bouthillier =

Victor Le Bouthillier de Chavigny
- Archbishop of Tours
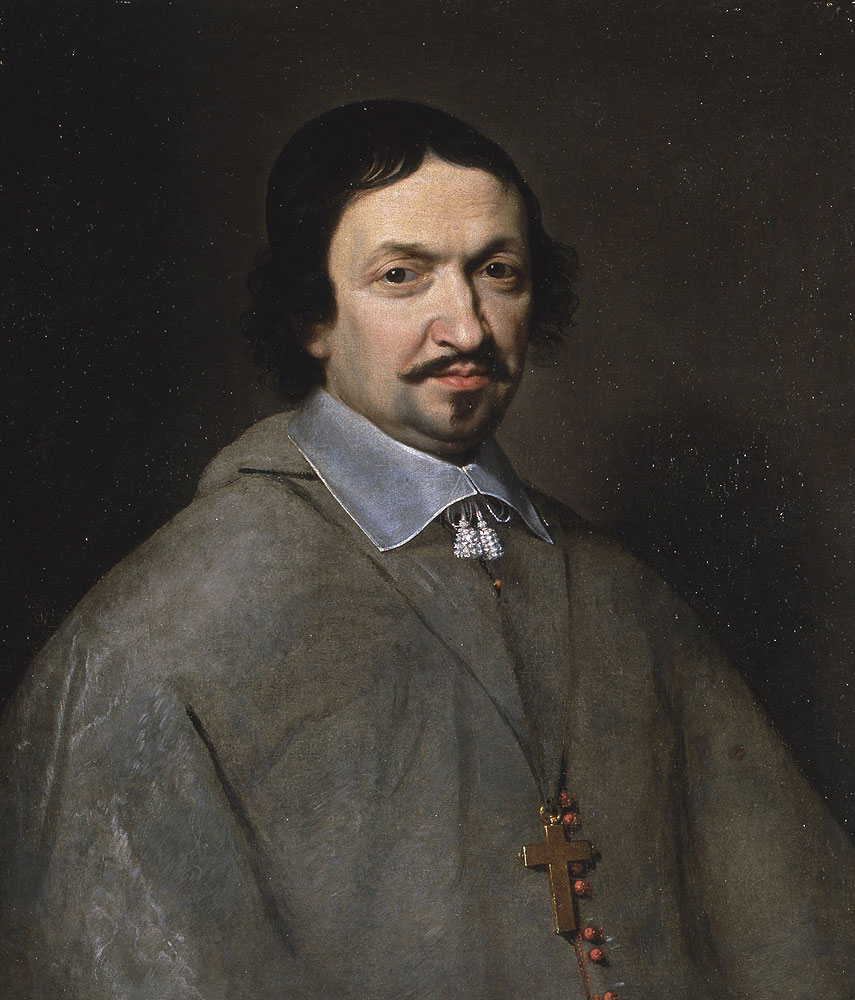
- Portrait of Victor Le Bouthillier by Claude Mellan, 1658
- Church: Catholic Church
- Archdiocese: Archdiocese of Tours
- In office: 21 May 1641 – 12 September 1670
- Predecessor: Bertrand d'Eschaud
- Successor: Charles de Rosmadec
- Previous posts: Coadjutor Archbishop of Tours (1631-1641); Bishop of Boulogne (1627-1631)

Orders
- Consecration: 9 April 1628 by Jean-François de Gondi

Personal details
- Born: 1590 Paris, Kingdom of France
- Died: 12 September 1670 (aged 79–80)

Victor Le Bouthillier de Chavigny (1590 – 12 September 1670) was a French politician and clergyman. He was a counselor of state and served as almoner to Marie de Medici then to Gaston, Duke of Orleans. He was coadjutor of the archdiocese of Tours from 1630 to 1641, bishop of Boulogne from 1626 to 1628 and archbishop of Tours from 1641 to 1670.

He was the uncle of Armand Jean Le Bouthillier de Rancé (1626-1700), reformer of La Trappe Abbey, which he had tried to take over as coadjutor in 1657, against opposition by Cardinal Mazarin.

His library was expanded by Léon Bouthillier then Denis-François Bouthillier before being split between Montpellier, Troyes and the Bibliothèque nationale de France in Paris.

== Sources ==
- Eugène Van Drival, Histoire des évêques de Boulogne, Boulogne-sur-Mer, 1852
