= Ancient Diocese of Boulogne =

Roman Catholic diocese in France (1567 -1801)

Coordinates: 50.73°N 1.62°E

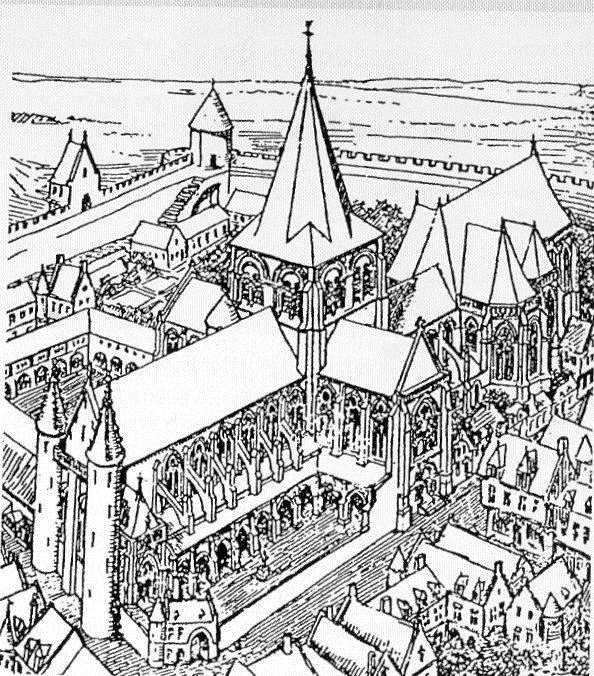
The former cathedral of Boulogne (artistic reconstruction)

The former French Catholic diocese of Boulogne existed from 1567 to the French Revolution. It was created after the diocese of Thérouanne was suppressed because of war damage to the see; effectively this was a renaming. It belonged to the Archdiocese of Reims. The Concordat of 1801 suppressed the diocese of Boulogne, transferring its territory to the diocese of Arras. The seat was the Boulogne Cathedral, demolished in 1793.

== Bishops ==
- Claude-André Dormy 1567–1599
- Claude Dormy 1600–1626
- Victor Le Bouthillier 1626–1630
- Jean Dolce 1633–1643
- François Perrochel 1643–1675
- Nicolas Ladvocat-Billiard 1677–1681
- Claude Le Tonnelier de Breteuil 1682–1698
- Antoine-Girard de La Bournat 1698
- Pierre de Langle 1698–1724
- Jean-Marie Henriau 1724–1738
- Augustin-César D'Hervilly de Devise 1738–1742
- François-Joseph-Gaston de Partz de Pressy 1742–1789
- Jean-René Asseline 1789–1790

== See also ==
- Catholic Church in France
- List of Catholic dioceses in France

== Bibliography ==
=== Reference works ===
- Gams, Pius Bonifatius (1873). Series episcoporum Ecclesiae catholicae: quotquot innotuerunt a beato Petro apostolo. Ratisbon: Typis et Sumptibus Georgii Josephi Manz. (Use with caution; obsolete)
- Eubel, Conradus, ed. (1913). Hierarchia catholica, Tomus 1 (second ed.). Münster: Libreria Regensbergiana. (in Latin)
- Eubel, Conradus, ed. (1914). Hierarchia catholica, Tomus 2 (second ed.). Münster: Libreria Regensbergiana. (in Latin)
- Gulik, Guilelmus (1923). Eubel, Conradus (ed.). Hierarchia catholica, Tomus 3 (second ed.). Münster: Libreria Regensbergiana.
- Gauchat, Patritius (Patrice) (1935). Hierarchia catholica IV (1592-1667). Münster: Libraria Regensbergiana.
- Ritzler, Remigius; Sefrin, Pirminus (1952). Hierarchia catholica medii et recentis aevi V (1667-1730). Patavii: Messagero di S. Antonio.
- Ritzler, Remigius; Sefrin, Pirminus (1958). Hierarchia catholica medii et recentis aevi VI (1730-1799). Patavii: Messagero di S. Antonio.

=== Studies ===
- Duchesne, Louis (1910). Fastes épiscopaux de l'ancienne Gaule: II. L'Aquitaine et les Lyonnaises. Paris: Fontemoing.
- Du Tems, Hugues (1774). Le clergé de France, ou tableau historique et chronologique des archevêques, évêques, abbés, abbesses et chefs des chapitres principaux du royaume, depuis la fondation des églises jusqu'à nos jours (in French). Vol. Tome premier. Paris: Delalain.
- Jean, Armand (1891). Les évêques et les archevêques de France depuis 1682 jusqu'à 1801 (in French). Paris: A. Picard. p. 78.
