= La Valsainte Charterhouse =

Carthusian monastery in Switzerland

Coordinates: 46.649278°N 7.188653°E

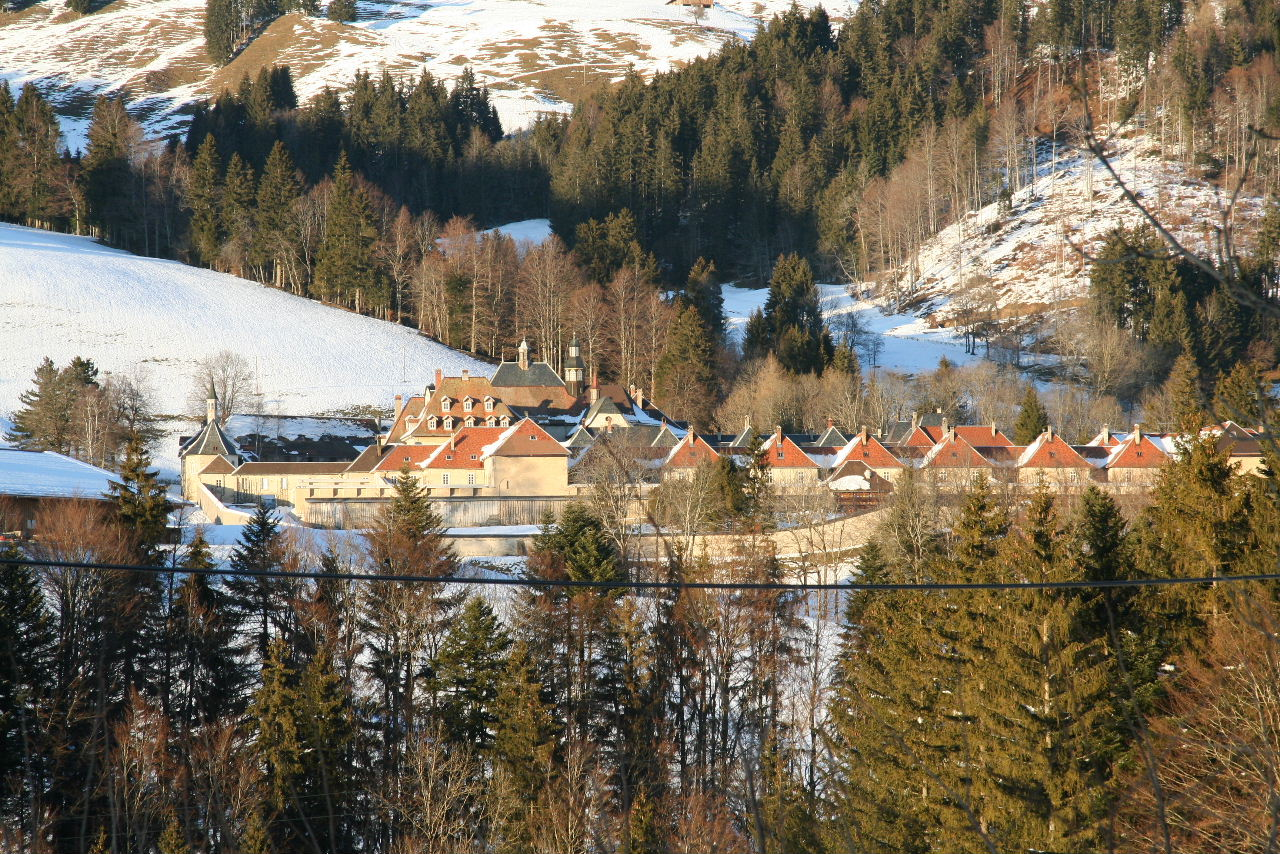
La Valsainte Charterhouse in 2007, after the works

A 1925 aerial photograph by Walter Mittelholzer

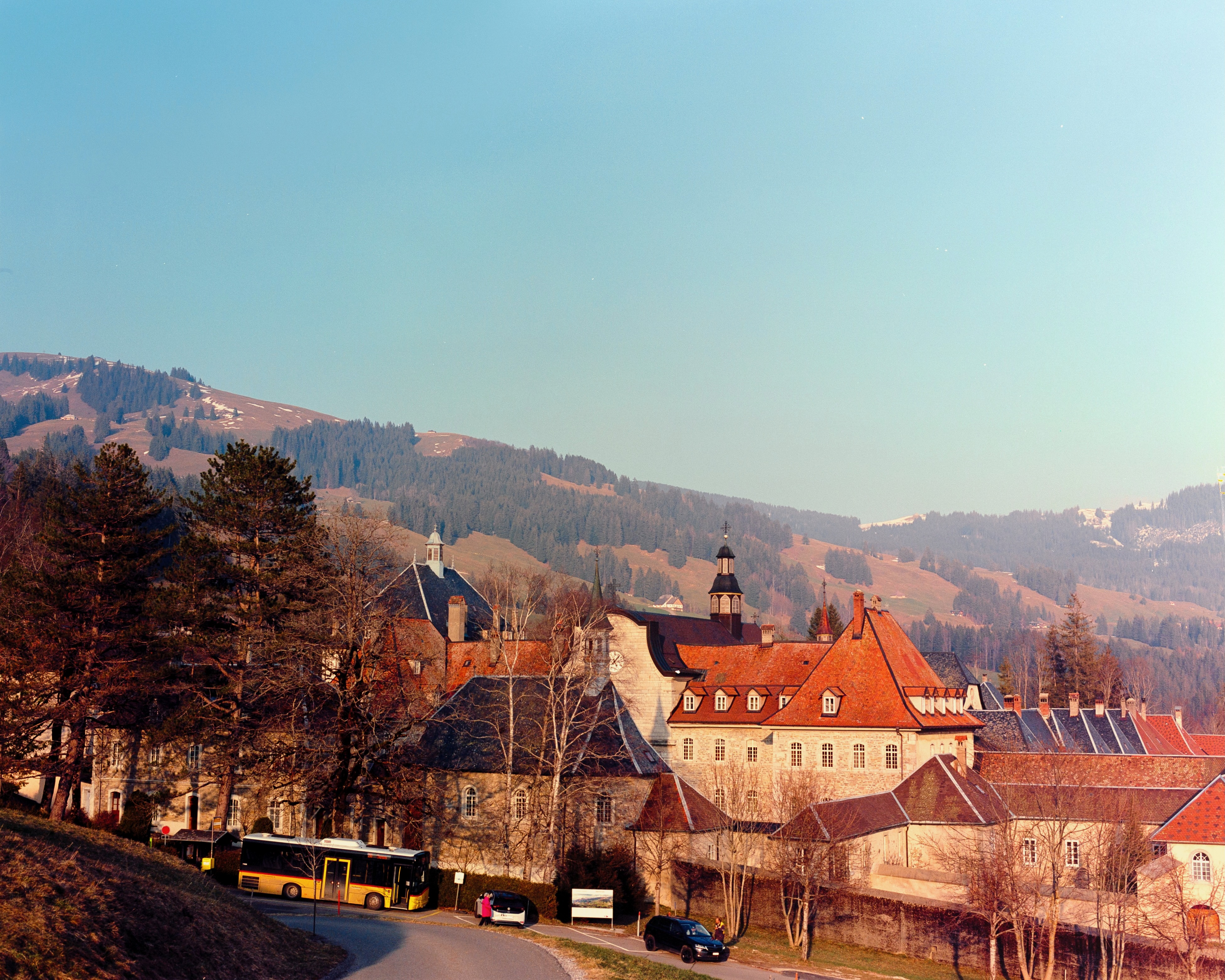
Church and main building, with Prealps in the background

La Valsainte Charterhouse or La Valsainte (Latin: Vallis sanctorum omnium, later Vallis Sancta) situated in La Valsainte in the district of Gruyère, Canton of Fribourg, is the only remaining extant Carthusian monastery in Switzerland.

== History ==
The charterhouse, in the heart of the Javro and Jogne valleys, was founded in 1295 by Girard I, lord of Corbières. In the Middle Ages it was the owner of a vast territory covering the greater part of the present communes of Cerniat and Charmey, over which by right of its lordship it exercised the high and the low justice. It was destroyed by fire in 1381.

In 1454 it passed into the lordship of the County of Greyerz, with which it passed again in 1535 to the city of Fribourg. The government of Fribourg were not kindly disposed toward the monastery, but their efforts to suppress it and absorb its revenues were for many years opposed by the French, who supported it. However, in 1778 the Pope agreed to its suppression, and the government of Fribourg used its revenues to cover the costs of the Diocese of Lausanne, for which they had become responsible. The monks moved to La Part-Dieu Charterhouse at Bulle.

In 1791, during the French Revolution, the empty charterhouse at La Valsainte gave shelter to refugee French Trappists under Dom Augustin de Lestrange. Dom Basile Nantas managed to preserve a copy of the manuscript containing the recipe for the Herbal Elixir Chartreuse. In 1794 the premises were declared by Pope Pius VI a Cistercian abbey, which became the birthplace of the Cistercian Reform movement. The Trappists were expelled by Napoleon in 1798, but returned to it from 1802 to 1812 and again from 1814 to 1815. From 1818 to 1824, the monastery provided shelter for a group of Redemptorists. It was then sold, and demolished apart from the principal block, built in 1729.

In 1863, the local political climate had changed sufficiently to permit the return of the Carthusian community from La Part-Dieu Charterhouse, which had been suppressed in 1848, and the ruined site was in part restored but mostly rebuilt. The present buildings thus consist of the main block of 1729 surrounded by late 19th century additions and extensions (monks' cells, converts' building, chapel and various buildings outside the monastery itself).

Around the turn of the 19th and 20th centuries the anti-clerical laws passed in France resulted in the expulsion of Carthusian monks, and two additional ranges of cells were built at La Valsainte to accommodate some of them, in 1886 and 1901. In 1903 and 1904 the Chapter General of the Carthusian order met here. The impossibility of pursuing monastic vocations in France at this period meant an increase of vocations at La Valsainte.

"Throughout the twentieth century, La Valsainte functioned as an influential centre of Catholic monasticism that attracted intellectuals with an interest in spirituality."

Servant of God Cardinal Charles Journet is buried at La Valsainte.

== Buildings ==
=== Restoration of the church ===
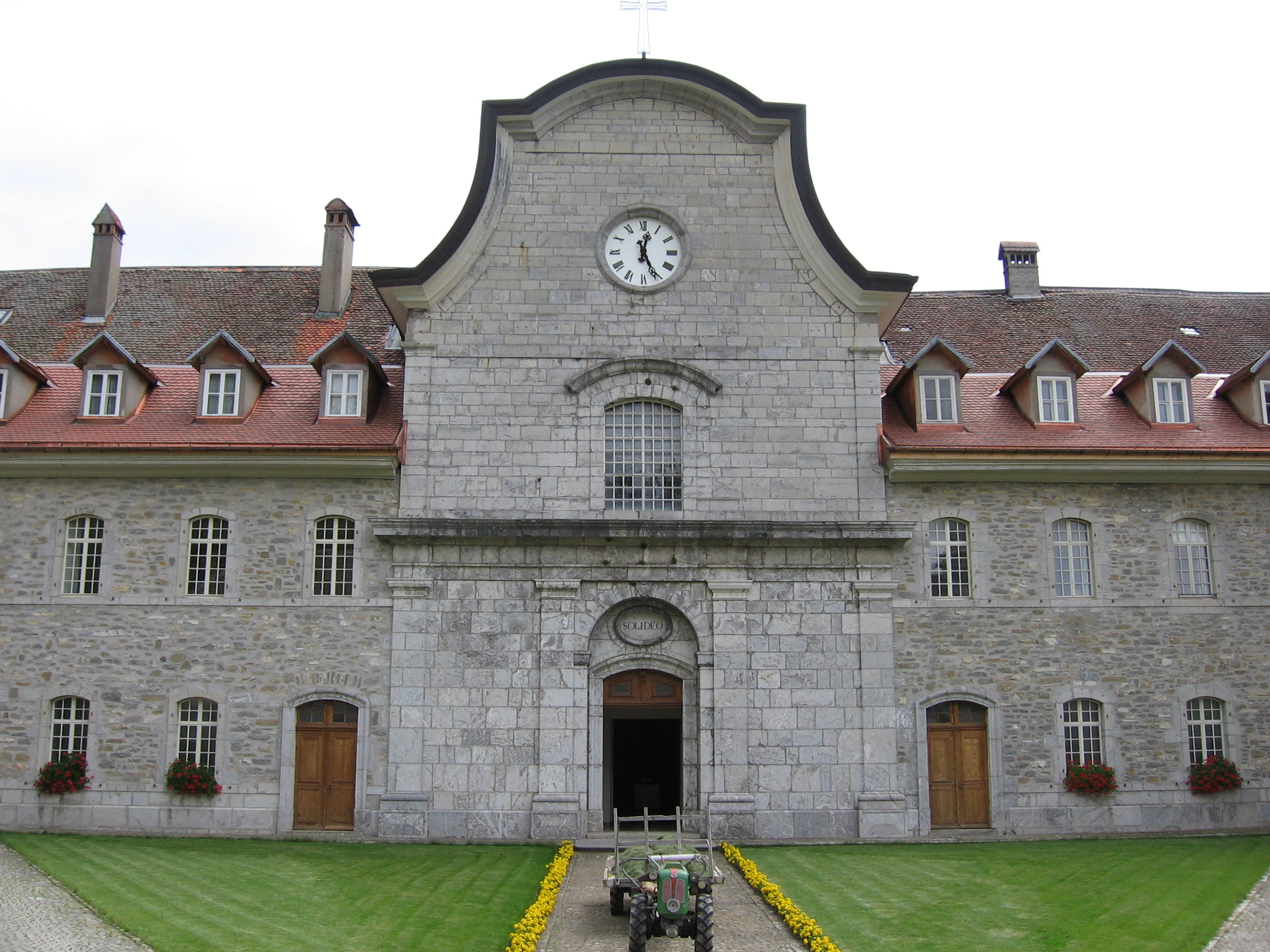
Entrance of the church

In the 1970s the church was thoroughly restored. All 19th century interior work was swept away (except for the stalls), including the flooring. The partition between the choir of the Fathers and that of the lay monks was removed, and the sanctuary was gutted. Work on the roof revealed, in the extreme west, two bays of 14th century vaulting in Tuffière stone, which had somehow survived the destruction of the 19th century. These are the oldest surviving part of the monastery premises.

Warmth and vitality is given to the bare walls by the non-figurative stained glass windows by the painter Bernard Schorderet. The tabernacle and the processional cross are both in enamel by the French artist Raymond Mirande. A Gothic Madonna of the 14th century, a gift, stands to the left of the main altar.

Several other Carthusian monasteries have taken inspiration from the restoration of La Valsainte for work on their own churches, notably the Montalegre Charterhouse near Barcelona.

=== Novices' cloister ===
The range of buildings latterly known as the novices' cloister, one of those constructed in haste around the turn of the 19th and 20th centuries for the accommodation of exiled French monks, was discovered in the 1990s to be in danger of collapse, undermined by groundwater, and was demolished.

== Community ==
The revived community at La Valsainte has included some distinguished members, and the inclusion of numbers of French religious has added to the vigour of Roman Catholic spiritual life in Switzerland. Apart from the public chapel, the charterhouse is closed to visitors.

At the Musée de Charmey, a reconstruction introduces visitors to the daily lives of the Carthusian monks. The lay brothers, monks and priors of La Valsainte were closely involved in the restoration work prior to it going on public view.

=== Priors ===
Two priors are of particular note for the charterhouse:

- Dom Florent Miège, prior during the 1920s, was a French religious, spiritual father of Raïssa Maritain and adviser of her husband, the philosopher Jacques Maritain.
- Dom Nicolas Barras, member of the community from 1934 to 1981, for many of which years he was prior, was a Swiss Carthusian, responsible for the integration of the monastery into the local society and for the many practical issues thrown up by the maintenance of the buildings and the application of the order's statutes to contemporary life. For example, he authorised and oversaw the installation of electricity, and supervised the adaptation of the prescribed diet to the limited supplies available during World War II.

=== Monks ===
The 20th century monks of Valsainte include some who are distinguished as spiritual writers, such as Dom Augustin Guillerand (author of Silence cartusien) and Dom Jean-Baptiste Porion (author of Amour et Silence). Dom Porion in particular, who entered the monastery in 1921, caused many French artists and intellectuals to visit Valsainte, which resulted in numerous conversions. Jacques Loew, for example, was converted to Catholicism while attending a mass celebrated at Valsainte in the silence of dawn. Dom Benoit Lambres, a prolific Carthusian writer of the 20th century, was a monk at Valsainte.

=== Membership ===
The community, in 2023, comprised around 15. Numbers of vocations have declined since the 1970s. In the last twenty years the community has lost over half its members, but has received only 4-5 new ones.

== In fiction ==
The 1996 movie Broken Silence is about a contemporary Carthusian monk, Fried Adelphi, who has to break his vows of silence and meditation when he is sent across the world, in order to find the owner of La Valsainte and extend a 100-year lease which is about to expire. This comedy, totally fictional as the Carthusian community owns the property, depicts nevertheless quite accurately the psychological challenges that would be encountered today by exclaustrated monks.

The graphic novel "Un bruit étrange et beau" (2016) by Zep (A Strange and Beautiful Sound) runs about a Carthusian monk who has to come back to modern Paris after 25 years and how an encounter with a young woman challenges his life option.
