= Armand Jean le Bouthillier de Rancé =

French abbot and founder of the Trappist Order (1626–1700)

The Reverend Abbot Armand Jean le Bouthillier de Rancé OCSO
- Abbot of La Trappe Abbey
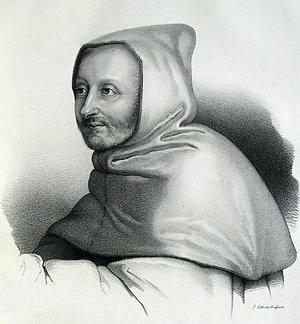
- Portrait of Armand Jean le Bouthillier de Rancé
- Appointed: 1636 (commendatory); 1664 (regular)

Orders
- Ordination: 1651 by Victor Le Bouthillier
- Rank: Priest

Personal details
- Born: 9 January 1626 Paris, Kingdom of France
- Died: 27 October 1700 (aged 74) Soligny-la-Trappe, Kingdom of France
- Denomination: Catholic Church
- Residence: La Trappe Abbey
- Parents: Denis Bouthillier (father)
- Occupation: Abbot
- Profession: Trappist
- Education: Doctor of Sacred Theology, 1654

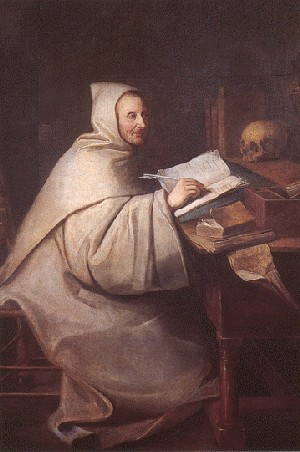
Armand Bouthillier Rancé

Armand Jean le Bouthillier de Rancé, OCSO (9 January 1626, Paris – 27 October 1700, Soligny-la-Trappe) was a French abbot of La Trappe Abbey, a controversialist author, and a founding father of the Trappists.

== Early life ==
Armand Jean le Bouthillier de Rancé was born 9 January 1626 in Paris, the second son of Denis Bouthillier, Lord of Rancé, and Councillor of State. His godfather was the Cardinal Duke of Richelieu; his uncle Victor Le Bouthillier, Archbishop of Tours.

Armand dedicated himself to ecclesiastical service, in order to preserve in the family the former numerous benefices. At ten, he became the commendatory abbot of the Cistercian abbey of La Trappe and two other abbeys, prior of two priories, and canon of Notre-Dame de Paris, which gave him a revenue of about 15,000 livres. At twelve he published a translation of Anacreon with Greek notes. He attended the College d'Harcourt in Paris and went through his course of theological studies with great distinction. In 1651, he was ordained a priest by his uncle Victor Le Bouthillier and embarked on a career as a court abbot. The manner of his life was worldly in the extreme. He declined an appointment as bishop of the Diocese of St. Pol de Leon because he considered the income too small.

In 1652 his father died, leaving him a further increase in estate. At the age of twenty-six he was thus left with practically unlimited wealth. He divided his time between preaching and other priestly obligations, and feasting and the pleasures of fox hunting. He obtained his doctorate in theology in 1654. His uncle, who wanted him as coadjutor bishop, made him archdeacon, and caused him to be elected deputy of the second order to the General Assembly of the French Clergy in 1655. He was also appointed First Almoner to Gaston, Duke of Orléans, in 1656.

== Monastic life and reform ==
The death of his mistress, the Duchess of Montbazon in 1657 gave him the first serious thought leading to his conversion. Later in 1660 he assisted at the death of Duke of Orléans, which made so great an impression on him that he said: "Either the Gospel deceives us, or this is the house of a reprobate". After having taken counsel, he disposed of all his possessions, except the Abbey of La Trappe, which he visited for the first time in 1662.

He retired to his abbey, of which he became regular abbot in 1664 and introduced an austere reform. Rancé's reform focused first and foremost centered on penitence; his severity "went beyond the Cistercian tradition," and was modelled in many ways on early Eastern monasticism, with John Climacus playing a leading role. Rancé prescribed hard manual labour, silence, a meagre diet, isolation from the world, and renunciation of most studies. He wrote spiritual works and polemical pamphlets. An important controversy ensued when he engaged in a polemic with Jean Mabillon about how much monks were to study, which according to de Rancé was very little.

His penitential mode of life made him many enemies, and caused him to be accused of Jansenism. Indeed, he had ties to Port-Royal, a leading center of Jansenism. He did, however, sign the Formula (against Jansenism). He remained "always a figure of controversy."

He resigned his abbacy in 1695, owing to declining health, and died in 1700.

== Legacy ==
De Rancé did not succeed in winning many other Cistercian abbots to his causes. In the Cistercian War of Observances, arbitration from the Holy See consistently forced the Abstinents to compromise with the Common Observance. The practices that de Rancé instituted in La Trappe did, however, spread to some Cistercian monasteries, mainly in France. His influence remained minor until the nineteenth century, when the French monasteries devoted to his ideals grew and created new foundations abroad. They called themselves "Trappist" in reference to La Trappe, the source and origin of their reforms. In 1892, with the approval of Pope Leo XIII, the various Trappist congregations left the Cistercian Order and formed the Trappist Order, then named the 'Order of Reformed Cistercians of Our Lady of La Trappe'.

A biography of his life, Vie de Rancé, was the final work of the Romantic writer and politician, François-René de Chateaubriand, published in 1844.

== Bibliography ==
=== Works by de Rancé ===
- Vies de plusieurs solitaires de La Trappe
- Le traité de la sainteté et des devoirs de la vie monastique
- La règle de s. Benoît, traduite et expliqué selon son véritable esprit
- Les instructions de Saint Dorothée (Paris, 1686)

=== Works about de Rancé ===
- Alban Krailsheimer: Armand-Jean de Rancé: abbot of La Trappe; his influence in the cloister and the world. Oxford: Clarendon Press, 1974.
- David N. Bell: Understanding Rance: The Spirituality of the Abbot of La Trappe in Context. Kalamazoo, Michigan: Cistercian Publications, 2005.
