= Jean Bodin =

French jurist and political philosopher (c. 1530–1596)

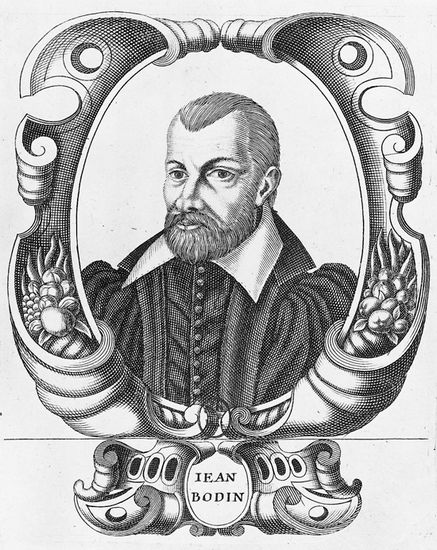
- Born: c. 1530; Angers, Anjou, France
- Died: 1596; Laon, Picardy, France
- Other name: "René Herpin"

Education
- Education: University of Paris; Collège des Quatre Langues; University of Toulouse
- Academic advisor: Guillaume Prévost

Philosophical work
- Era: Renaissance philosophy
- Region: Western philosophy
- School: Mercantilism
- Institutions: University of Toulouse
- Main interests: Legal philosophy, political philosophy, economics
- Notable ideas: Quantity theory of money, absolute sovereignty

Jean Bodin (/boʊˈdæn/; French: [ʒɑ̃ bɔdɛ̃]; c. 1530 – 1596) was a French jurist and political philosopher, member of the Parlement of Paris and professor of law at the University of Toulouse. Bodin lived during the aftermath of the Protestant Reformation and wrote against the background of religious conflict in France. He seemed to be a nominal Catholic throughout his life but was critical of papal authority over governments. Known for his theory of sovereignty, he favoured the strong central control of a national monarchy as an antidote to factional strife.

Towards the end of his life, he wrote a dialogue among different religions, including representatives of Judaism, Islam and natural theology in which all agreed to coexist in concord, but was not published. He was also an influential writer on demonology, as his later years were spent during the peak of the early modern witch trials.

== Life ==
Jean Bodin was successively a friar, academic, professional lawyer, and political adviser. An excursion as a politician having proved a failure, he lived out his life as a provincial magistrate.

=== Early life ===
Bodin was born in or near Angers, most likely between June 1529 and June 1530, into a bourgeois family. His father was Guillaume Bodin, a prosperous master tailor. Jean's mother, Catherine Dutertre, was the sister of the procurator of the Carmelite monastery in Angers. As a younger son in a family with seven children, Jean stood to inherit little. He was probably still young when he joined the Carmelite order at Angers to be educated and prepared for the priesthood.

=== Paris and Toulouse ===
Bodin was sent to the Carmelites' house in Paris, where he lived for at least two years as a monk and studied philosophy. He began his studies in Paris in about 1545, as a student of Guillaume Prévost, a little-known magister in philosophy. He received a strong grounding in the works of Aristotle. Although Bodin expressed a negative view of Aristotle, Aristotelianism formed the basis of his works. There is evidence that Bodin was strongly influenced by the teachings of Petrus Ramus and his followers, who at this time were controversially trying to create a new system of logic for the academic disciplines to replace the traditional Aristotelian logic. He also interacted with the prominent humanist scholars of the Collège Royal (the future Collège de France). There he learned Greek, gained a working knowledge of Hebrew, and studied classical literature. His Latin translation of the Greek Cynegetica of Pseudo-Oppian (published in 1555) was the most immediate result of his studies in this period.

After leaving Paris, Bodin appears to have returned to Angers and exited the Carmelite order, being released from his vows on the ground that he had taken them at a young age. According to Kenneth D. McRae, his departure from the order may have been caused by an increasing interest in unorthodox religious beliefs. In August 1548, A certain Carmelite named Jehan Baudin was tried for heresy at Paris. He was freed through the intercession of Gabriel Bouvery, the bishop of Angers (to whom Bodin dedicated his translation of Pseudo-Oppian). Between August 1552 and July 1553, a doctor of theology named Jean Bodin, a native of St. Amand in the diocese of Bourges, is recorded as receiving the status of resident of Geneva, the center of Calvinism. This Jean Bodin also married a widow named Typhaine Renaud on 25 August 1552. Whether these two individuals are to be identified with the author Jean Bodin (whose surname was a common one at the time) has been disputed by scholars.

From 1550 to 1560 Bodin studied civil law under Arnaud du Ferrier at the University of Toulouse, the leading French institution for legal studies. He also taught law there. His special subject at that time seems to have been comparative jurisprudence. Bodin had a plan for a school on humanist principles in Toulouse, but failed to raise local support. He left in 1560 and returned to Paris.

=== The Wars of Religion and the politiques ===
From 1561, Bodin was licensed as an attorney of the Parlement of Paris. His religious convictions on the outbreak of the Wars of Religion in 1562 cannot be determined, but he affirmed formally his Catholic faith, taking an oath that year along with other members of the Parlement. He continued to pursue his interests in legal and political theory in Paris, publishing significant works on historiography and economics.

Bodin became a member of the discussion circles around the Prince François d'Alençon (or d'Anjou from 1576). He was the intelligent and ambitious youngest son of Henry II, and was in line for the throne in 1574, with the death of his brother Charles IX. He withdrew his claim, however, in favor of his older brother Henry III, who had recently returned from his abortive effort to reign as the King of Poland. Alençon was a leader of the politiques faction of political pragmatists.

=== Under Henry III ===
After the failure of Prince François' hopes to ascend the throne, Bodin transferred his allegiance to the new king Henry III. In practical politics, however, he lost the king's favor in 1576–7, as delegate of the Third Estate at the Estates-General at Blois, and leader in his Estate of the February 1577 moves to prevent a new war against the Huguenots. He attempted to exert a moderating influence on the Catholic party, and also tried to restrict the passage of supplemental taxation for the king. Bodin then retired from political life; he had married in February 1576. His wife, Françoise Trouillart, was the widow of Claude Bayard, and sister of Nicolas Trouillart who died in 1587; both were royal attorneys in the Provost of Laon and attorneys in the Bailiwick of Vermandois, and Bodin took over the charges.

Jean Bodin was in touch with William Wade in Paris, Lord Burghley's contact, at the time (1576) of publication of the Six livres. He later accompanied Prince François, by then Duke of Anjou, to England in 1581, in his second attempt to woo Queen Elizabeth I. On this visit, Bodin saw the English Parliament. He brushed off a request to secure better treatment for English Catholics, to the dismay of Robert Persons, given that Edmund Campion was in prison at the time. Bodin saw some of Campion's trial, he is said also to have witnessed Campion's execution in December 1581, making the hanging the occasion for a public letter against the use of force in matters of religion. Bodin became a correspondent of Francis Walsingham; and Michel de Castelnau passed on to Mary, Queen of Scots a prophecy supposed to be Bodin's, on the death of Elizabeth, at the time of the Babington Plot.

Prince François became Duke of Brabant in 1582, however, and embarked on an adventurous campaign to expand his territory. The disapproving Bodin accompanied him, and was trapped in the Prince's disastrous raid on Antwerp that ended the attempt, followed shortly by the Prince's death in 1584.

=== Last years ===
In the wars that followed the death of Henry III (1589), the Catholic League attempted to prevent the succession of the Protestant Henri de Navarre by placing another king on the throne. Bodin initially gave support to the powerful League; he felt it inevitable that they would score a quick victory.

Jean Bodin died in Laon, during one of the many plague epidemics of the time.

== Books ==
Bodin generally wrote in French, with later Latin translations. Several of the works have been seen as influenced by Ramism, at least in terms of structure.

Bodin wrote in turn books on history, economics, politics, demonology, and natural philosophy; and also left a (later notorious) work in manuscript on religion (see under "Religious tolerance"). A modern edition of Bodin's works was begun in 1951 as Oeuvres philosophiques de Jean Bodin by Pierre Mesnard, but only one volume appeared.

=== Methodus ad facilem historiarum cognitionem ===
In France, Bodin was noted as a historian for his Methodus ad facilem historiarum cognitionem (1566) (Method for the easy knowledge of history). He wrote, "Of history, that is, the true narration of things, there are three kinds: human, natural and divine". This book was one of the most significant contributions to the ars historica of the period, and distinctively put an emphasis on the role of political knowledge in interpreting historical writings. He pointed out that the knowledge of historical legal systems could be useful for contemporary legislation.

The Methodus was a successful and influential manual on the writing of technical history. It answered by means of detailed historiographical advice the skeptical line on the possibility of historical knowledge advanced by Francesco Patrizzi. It also expanded the view of historical "data" found in earlier humanists, with the immediacy of its concerns for the social side of human life.

Jean Bodin rejected the biblical Four Monarchies model, taking an unpopular position at the time, as well as the classical theory of a Golden Age for its naiveté. He also dropped much of the rhetorical apparatus of the humanists.

=== Economic thought: the Reply to Malestroit ===
The Réponse de J. Bodin aux paradoxes de M. de Malestroit (1568) was a tract, provoked by theories of Jean Cherruies "Seigneur de Malestroit", in which Bodin offered one of the earliest scholarly analyses of the phenomenon of inflation, unknown prior to the 16th century. The background to discussion in the 1560s was that by 1550 an increase in the money supply in Western Europe had brought general benefits. But there had also been appreciable inflation. Silver arriving via Spain from the South American mine of Potosí, together with other sources of silver and gold, from other new sources, was causing monetary change.

Bodin was after Martín de Azpilicueta, who had alluded to the issue in 1556 (something noticed also by Gómara in his unpublished Annals), an early observer that the rise in prices was due in large part to the influx of precious metals. Analysing the phenomenon, amongst other factors he pointed to the relationship between the amount of goods and the amount of money in circulation. The debates of the time laid the foundation for the "quantity theory of money". Bodin mentioned other factors: population increase, trade, the possibility of economic migration, and consumption that he saw as profligate.

=== The Theatrum ===
The Theatrum Universae Naturae is Bodin's statement of natural philosophy. It contains many particular and even idiosyncratic personal views, for instance that eclipses are related to political events. It argued against the certainty of the astronomical theory of stellar parallax, and the terrestrial origin of the "comet of 1573" (i.e., the supernova SN 1572). This work shows major Ramist influences. Consideration of the orderly majesty of God leads to encyclopedism about the universe and an analogue of a memory system.

Problems of Bodin became attached to some Renaissance editions of Aristotelian problemata in natural philosophy. Further, Damian Siffert compiled a Problemata Bodini, which was based on the Theatrum.

=== Les Six livres de la République ===
Jean Bodin's best-known work was "The Six Books of the Republic" (Les Six livres de la République), written in 1576. The discussion regarding the best form of government which took place in those years around the St. Bartholomew's Day massacre (1572) gave the inspiration. Bodin's, classical, definition of sovereignty is: "la puissance absolue et perpetuelle d'une République" (the absolute and perpetual power of a Republic). His main ideas about sovereignty are found in chapter VIII and X of Book I, including his statement "The sovereign Prince is accountable only to God".

The Six livres were an immediate success and were frequently reprinted. A revised and expanded Latin translation by the author appeared in 1586. With this work, Bodin became one of the founders of the pragmatic inter-confessional group known as the politiques, who ultimately succeeded in ending the Wars of Religion under King Henry IV, with the Edict of Nantes (1598). Against the monarchomachs who were assailing kingship in his time, such as Theodore Beza and François Hotman, Bodin succeeded in writing a fundamental and influential treatise of social and political theory. In its reasoning against all types of mixed constitution and resistance theory, it was an effective counter-attack against the monarchomach position invoking "popular sovereignty".

The structure of the earlier books has been described as Ramist in structure. Book VI contains astrological and numerological reasoning. Bodin invoked Pythagoras in discussing justice and in Book IV used ideas related to the Utopia of Thomas More. The use of language derived from or replacing Niccolò Machiavelli's città (Latin civitas) as political unit (French cité or ville) is thoughtful; Bodin introduced republic (French république, Latin respublica) as a term for matters of public law (the contemporary English rendering was commonweal(th)). Bodin, although he referred to Tacitus, was not writing here in the tradition of classical republicanism. The Ottoman Empire is analysed as a "seigneurial monarchy". The Republic of Venice is not accepted in the terms of Gasparo Contarini: it is called an aristocratic constitution, not a mixed one, with a concentric structure, and its apparent stability was not attributable to the form of government.

The ideas in the Six livres on the importance of climate in the shaping of a people's character were also influential, finding a prominent place in the work of Giovanni Botero (1544–1617) and later in Baron de Montesquieu's (1689–1755) climatic determinism. Based on the assumption that a country's climate shapes the character of its population, and hence to a large extent the most suitable form of government, Bodin postulated that a hereditary monarchy would be the ideal regime for a temperate nation such as France. This power should be "sovereign", i.e., not be subject to any other branch, though to some extent limited by institutions like the high courts (Parlement) and representative assemblies (États). Above all, the monarch is "responsible only to God", that is, must stand above confessional factions.

In 1581, his Apologie de René Herpin pour la République de Jean Bodin, written under the pseudonym of René Herpin, was published as a response to critics.

The Six livres soon became widely known. Gaspar de Anastro made a Spanish translation in 1590. Richard Knolles put together an English translation (1606); this was based on the 1586 Latin version, but in places follows other versions. It appeared under the title The Six Bookes of a Common-weale.

=== De la démonomanie des sorciers ===
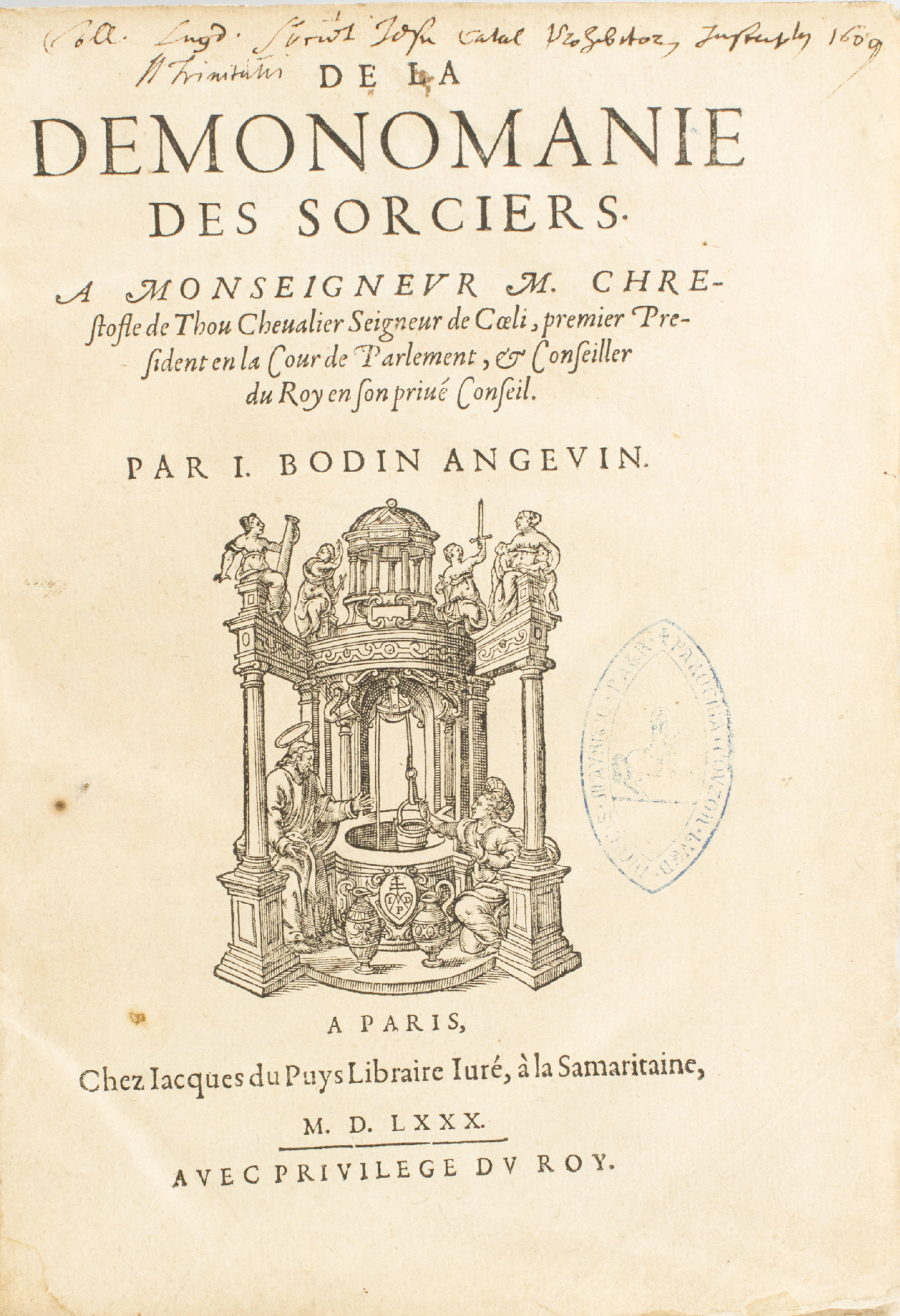
Title page of De la démonomanie des sorciers (1580)

Bodin's major work on sorcery and the witchcraft persecutions was On the Demonomania of the Sorcerers (De la démonomanie des sorciers), first issued in 1580, with ten editions published by 1604. In it he elaborates the influential concept of "pact witchcraft" based on a deal with the Devil and the belief that the evil spirit would use a strategy to impose doubt on judges to look upon magicians as madmen and hypochondriacs deserving of compassion rather than chastisement.

The book relates histories of sorcerers, but does not mention Faust and his pact. It gave a report of a 1552 public exorcism in Paris, and of the case of Magdalena de la Cruz of Cordova, an abbess who had confessed to sexual relations with the Devil over three decades. Bodin cited Pierre Marner on werewolf accounts from Savoie. He denounced the works of Cornelius Agrippa, and the perceived traffic in "sorceries" carried out along the Spanish Road, running along eastern France for much of its length.

He wrote in extreme terms about procedures in sorcery trials, opposing the normal safeguards of justice. This advocacy of relaxation was aimed directly at the existing standards laid down by the Parlement of Paris (physical or written evidence, confessions not obtained by torture, unimpeachable witnesses). He asserted that not even one witch could be erroneously condemned if the correct procedures were followed, because rumours concerning sorcerers were almost always true. Bodin's attitude has been called a populationist strategy typical of mercantilism.

The book was influential in the debate over witchcraft; it was translated into German by Johann Fischart (1581), and in the same year into Latin by François Du Jon as De magorum dæmonomania libri IV. It was quoted by Jean de Léry, writing about the Tupinamba people of what is now Brazil.

One surviving copy of the text, located in the University of Southern California's Special Collections Library, is a rare presentation copy signed by Bodin himself, and is one of only two known surviving texts that feature such an inscription by the author. The USC Démonomanie dedication is to a C.L. Varroni, thought to be a legal colleague of Bodin's.

== Views ==
=== Law and politics ===
Jean Bodin became well known for his analysis of sovereignty, which he took to be indivisible, and to involve full legislative powers (though with qualifications and caveats). With François Hotman (1524–1590) and François Baudouin (1520–1573), on the other hand, Bodin also supported the force of customary law, seeing Roman law alone as inadequate.

He hedged the absolutist nature of his theory of sovereignty, which was an analytical concept; if later his ideas were used in a different, normative fashion, that was not overtly the reason in Bodin. Sovereignty could be looked at as a "bundle of attributes"; in that light the legislative role took centre stage, and other "marks of sovereignty" could be discussed further, as separate issues. He was a politique in theory, which was the moderate position of the period in French politics; but drew the conclusion that only passive resistance to authority was justified.

Bodin's work on political theory saw the introduction of the modern concept of "state" but was in the fact on the cusp of usage (with that of Corasius), with the older meaning of a monarch "maintaining his state" not having dropped away. Public office belonged to the commonwealth, and its holders had a personal responsibility for their actions. Politics is autonomous, and the sovereign is subject to divine and natural law, but not to any church; the obligation is to secure justice and religious worship in the state.

Bodin studied the balance of liberty and authority. He had no doctrine of separation of powers and argued in a traditional way about royal prerogative and its proper, limited sphere. His doctrine was one of balance as harmony, with numerous qualifications; as such it could be used in different manners, and was. The key was that the central point of power should be above faction. Rose sees Bodin's politics as ultimately theocratic, and misunderstood by the absolutists who followed him.

Where Aristotle argued for six types of state, Bodin allowed only monarchy, aristocracy and democracy. He advocated, however, distinguishing the form of state (constitution) from the form of government (administration). Bodin had a low opinion of democracy.

Families were the basic unit and model for the state; on the other hand John Milton found in Bodin an ally on the topic of divorce. Respect for individual liberty and possessions were the hallmark of the orderly state, a view Bodin shared with Hotman and George Buchanan. He argued against slavery.

In matters of law and politics, Bodin saw religion as a social prop, encouraging respect for law and governance.

=== On change and progress ===
Bodin praised printing as outshining any achievement of the ancients. The idea that the Protestant Reformation was driven by economic and political forces is attributed to him. He is identified as the first person to realize the rapid rate of change of early modern Europe.

In physics, he is credited as the first modern writer to use the concept of physical laws to define change, but his idea of nature included the action of spirits. In politics, he adhered to the ideas of his time in considering a political revolution in the nature of an astronomical cycle: a changement (French) or simply a change (as translated 1606) in English; from Polybius Bodin took the idea of anacyclosis, or cyclic change of constitution. Bodin's theory was that governments had begun as monarchical, had then been democratic, before becoming aristocratic.

=== Religious tolerance ===
==== Public position ====
In 1576, Bodin was engaged in French politics, and then argued against the use of compulsion in matters of religion, if unsuccessfully. Wars, he considered, should be subject to statecraft, and matters of religion did not touch the state.

Bodin argued that a state might contain several religions; this was a very unusual position for his time, if shared by Michel de l'Hôpital and William the Silent. It was attacked by Pedro de Rivadeneira and Juan de Mariana, from the conventional opposing position of a state obligation to root out religious dissent. He argued in the Six livres that the Trial of the Knights Templar was an example of unjustified persecution, similar to that of the Jews and medieval fraternities.

==== Private position in the Colloquium ====
In 1588, Bodin completed in manuscript a Latin work Colloquium heptaplomeres de rerum sublimium arcanis abditis (Colloquium of the Seven about Secrets of the Sublime). It is a conversation about the nature of truth between seven educated men, each with a distinct religious or philosophical orientation - a natural philosopher, a Calvinist, a Muslim, a Roman Catholic, a Lutheran, a Jew, and a skeptic. Because of this work, Bodin is often identified as one of the first proponents of religious tolerance in the western world. Truth, in Bodin's view, commanded universal agreement; and the Abrahamic religions agreed on the Old Testament (Tanakh). Vera religio (true religion) would command loyalty to the point of death; his conception of it was influenced by Philo and Maimonides. His views on free will are also bound up with his studies in Jewish philosophy. Some modern scholars have contested his authorship of the text. The "Colloquium of the Seven regarding the hidden secrets of the sublime things" offers a peaceful discussion with seven representatives of various religions and worldviews, who in the end agree on the fundamental underlying similarity of their beliefs.

Bodin's theory, as based in considerations of harmony, resembles that of Sebastian Castellio. He has been seen as a scriptural relativist, and deist, with Montaigne and Pierre Charron; also in the group of learned Christian Hebraists with John Selden, Carlo Giuseppe Imbonati, and Gerhard Vossius. By reputation, at least, Bodin was cited as an unbeliever, deist or atheist by Christian writers who associated him with perceived free-thinking and sceptical tradition of Machiavelli and Pietro Pomponazzi, Lucilio Vanini, Thomas Hobbes and Baruch Spinoza: Pierre-Daniel Huet, Nathaniel Falck, Claude-François Houtteville. Pierre Bayle attributed to Bodin a maxim about the intellectual consequences of the non-existence of God (a precursor of Voltaire's, but based on a traditional commonplace of French thinkers). Wilhelm Dilthey later wrote that the protagonists in the Colloquium anticipate those of Gotthold Ephraim Lessing's Nathan der Weise.

The Colloquium was one of the major and most popular manuscripts in clandestine circulation in the early modern period, with more than 100 copies catalogued. it had an extensive covert circulation, after coming into intellectual fashion. The 1911 Encyclopædia Britannica states "It is curious that Leibniz, who originally regarded the Colloquium as the work of a professed enemy of Christianity, subsequently described it as a most valuable production". Its dissemination increased after 1700, even if its content was by then dated. It was interpreted in the 18th century as containing arguments for natural religion, as if the views expressed by Toralba (the proponent of natural religion) were Bodin's; wrongly, according to Rose, whose reconstruction of Bodin's religious views is a long way from belief in a detached deity. Grotius had a manuscript. Gottfried Leibniz, who criticized the Colloquium to Jacob Thomasius and Hermann Conring, some years later did editorial work on the manuscript. Henry Oldenburg wanted to copy it, for transmission to John Milton and possibly John Dury, or for some other connection in 1659. In 1662 Conring was seeking a copy for a princely library. It was not to be published in full until 1857, by Ludwig Noack, from manuscripts collected by Heinrich Christian von Seckenberg.

==== Personal religious convictions ====
Bodin was influenced by philosophic Judaism to believe in the annihilation of the wicked 'post exacta supplicia'.

19th-century author Eliphas Levi esteemed Bodin as a student of Jewish esoterism: "The Kabalist Bodin who has been considered erroneously of a feeble and superstitious mind, had no other motive in writing his Demonomania than that of warning people against dangerous incredulity. Initiated by the study of the Kabalah into the true secrets of Magic, he trembled at the danger to which society was exposed by the abandonment of this power to the wickedness of men."

=== Cultural and universal history and geography ===
Bodin was a polymath, concerned with universal history which he approached as a jurist. He belonged to an identifiable French school of antiquarian and cultural history, with Lancelot Voisin de La Popelinière, Louis Le Caron, Louis Le Roy, Étienne Pasquier and Nicolas Vignier.

Bodin's theory of the "Frankish Gauls", proposing a non-German genealogy for France, was still being reviled by Leibniz in the 18th century. Bodin argued that frank actually meant "free" in the Gallic language and, based on Caesar, he said the Gauls had crossed the Rhine to escape the Roman yoke, and so were called Franks, and the country of France derived its name from them (who were originally Gauls). Leon Poliakov discussed this in The Aryan Myth:

Etymological speculation and childish word games of this kind have been rife in western history ever since the Fathers of the Church, but it was the humanists of the Renaissance who first utilized them in the service of a new born chauvinism. It may be remarked, furthermore, that Bodin's theory attributes to the Frankish Gauls certain virtues which were unknown to the enslaved Gauls.

Historical disciples included Jacques Auguste de Thou and William Camden. The genre thus founded, drawing social conclusions, identified itself as "civil history", and was influenced particularly by Polybius. The Methodus has been called the first book to advance "a theory of universal history based on a purely secular study of the growth of civilisation". Bodin's secular attitude to history therefore goes some way to explain his perceived relationship to Machiavelli. While Bodin's common ground with Machiavelli is not so large, and indeed Bodin opposed the Godless vision of the world in Machiavelli, they are often enough paired, for example by A. C. Crombie as philosophical historians with contemporary concerns; Crombie also links Bodin with Francis Bacon, as rational and critical historians. Both Bodin and Machiavelli treat religion as situated historically.

Bodin drew largely on Johann Boemus, and also classical authors, as well as accounts from Leo Africanus and Francisco Álvares. He showed little interest, however, in the New World. In terms of theories of cultural diffusion he influenced Nathanael Carpenter, and many subsequently, with his "south-eastern origin" theory of the transmission from peoples of the Middle East to Greece and Rome (and hence to Northern Europe). Another follower was Peter Heylyn in his Microcosmus (1621). In anthropology Bodin showed indications of polygenism as theory of human origins. In clearer terms, on the other hand, he believed that mankind was unifying, the drivers being trade, and the indications of the respublica mundana (world commonwealth) and international law as developing. This was within a scheme of Vaticinium Eliae or three periods of 2000 years for universal history, to which he had little commitment, though indicating its connection with the three climate regions and their predominance.

The "south-eastern" theory depended for its explanation on Bodin's climate theory and astrology: it was given in the Methodus, and developed in Book VI of the Six Livres. He made an identification of peoples and geographical sectors with planetary influences, in Book V of the Six Livres. His astrological theory is combined with the Hippocratic tradition; but not in the conventional way of Ptolemy. It has been suggested that he took them from a follower of Cardano, Auger Ferrier.

== Reception ==
Bodin's conception of sovereignty was widely adopted in Europe. In a form simplified and adapted by others, such as the French jurists Charles Loyseau (1564–1627) and Cardin Le Bret (1558–1655), it played an important role in the development of absolutism.

=== In France ===
Influentially, Bodin defended an orderly Gallican monarchy against Huguenots, and any external interference. These general ideas became political orthodoxy, in the reign of Henry IV of France, tending to the beginnings of absolutism. Bodin had numerous followers as political theorist, including Pierre Grégoire, in whom with François Grimaudet legislative authority starts to become closer to the divine right of kings, and William Barclay. Pierre Charron in La Sagesse of 1601 uses the idea of state from Bodin but with fewer limitations on royal power; Charron in this work argued for a secular neo-stoicism, putting together ideas of Montaigne and Lipsius with those of Bodin. Charles Loyseau in the years 1608–10 published absolutist works with the emphasis on orderliness in society, going much beyond Bodin's writing of thirty years earlier, a trend that continued into the 17th century.

As a demonologist, his work was taken to be authoritative and based on experience as witch-hunting practitioner. As historian, he was prominently cited by Nicolas Lenglet Du Fresnoy in his 1713 Methode pour etudier l'Histoire. Montesquieu read Bodin closely; the modern sociology hinted at in Bodin, arising from the relationship between the state apparatus on the one hand, and society on the other, is developed in Montesquieu.

=== In Germany ===
Jean Bodin's rejection of the Four Monarchies model was unpopular, given the German investment in the Holy Roman Emperor as fourth monarch, the attitude of Johannes Sleidanus. The need to accommodate the existing structure of the Empire with Bodin as theorist of sovereignty led to a controversy running over nearly half a century; starting with Henning Arnisaeus, it continued unresolved to 1626 and the time of Christopher Besoldus. He drew a line under it, by adopting the concept of composite polyarchy, which held sway subsequently. Leibniz rejected Bodin's view of sovereignty, stating that it might amount only to territorial control, and the consequence drawn by writers in Bodin's tradition that federalism was chimeric.

=== In England ===
Generally, the English took great interest in the French Wars of Religion; their literature came into commonplace use in English political debate, and Amyas Paulet made immediate efforts to find the Six livres for Edward Dyer. Shortly Bodin's works were known in England: to Philip Sidney, Walter Ralegh, and to Gabriel Harvey who reported they were fashionable in Oxford. His ideas on inflation were familiar by 1581. Somerville makes the point that not all those who discussed sovereignty in England at this period necessarily took their views from Bodin: the ideas were in the air at the time, and some such as Hadrian à Saravia and Christopher Lever had their own reasoning to similar conclusions. Richard Hooker had access to the works, but doesn't reference them. John Donne cited Bodin in his Biathanatos.

Bodin's view of parallelism of French and English monarchies was accepted by Ralegh. Roger Twysden dissented: in his view, the English monarchy had never fitted Bodin's definition of sovereignty. Richard Beacon in Solon His Follie (1594), directed towards English colonisation in Ireland, used text derived from the Six livres, as well as much theory from Machiavelli; he also argued, against Bodin, that France was a mixed monarchy. Bodin influenced the controversial definitions of John Cowell, in his 1607 book The Interpreter, that caused a furore in Parliament during 1610. Edward Coke took from Bodin on sovereignty; and like him opposed the concept of mixed monarchy.

While Bodin's ideas on authority fitted with the theory of divine right of kings, his main concern was not with the choice of the sovereign. But that meant they could cut both ways, being cited by parliamentarians as well as royalists. Henry Parker in 1642 asserted the sovereignty of Parliament by Bodinian reasoning. James Whitelocke used Bodin's thought in discussing the King-in-Parliament. The royalist Robert Filmer borrowed largely from Bodin for the argument of his Patriarcha. John Locke in arguing decades later against Filmer in Two Treatises of Government didn't go behind his work to attack Bodin; but his ally James Tyrrell did, as did Algernon Sidney. Another royalist user of Bodin was Michael Hudson. John Milton used Bodin's theory in defending his anti-democratic plan for a Grand Council, after Oliver Cromwell's death.

Sir John Eliot summarized work of Arnisaeus as critic of Bodin, and wrote in the Tower of London following Bodin that a lawful king, as opposed to a tyrant, "will not do what he may do", in his De iure majestatis. Robert Bruce Cotton quoted Bodin on the value of money; Robert Burton on politics in the Anatomy of Melancholy.

Richard Knolles in the introduction to his 1606 translation commended the book as written by a man experienced in public affairs. William Loe complained, in preaching to Parliament in 1621, that Bodin with Lipsius and Machiavelli was too much studied, to the neglect of Scripture. Richard Baxter on the other hand regarded the reading of Bodin, Hugo Grotius and Francisco Suárez as a suitable training in politics, for lawyers.

Bodin's views on witchcraft were taken up in England by the witch-hunter Brian Darcy in the early 1580s, who argued for burning rather than hanging as a method of execution, and followed some of Bodin's suggestions in interrogating Ursula Kemp. They were also radically opposed by Reginald Scott in his sceptical work Discoverie of Witchcraft (1584). Later Francis Hutchinson was his detractor, criticising his methodology.

=== In Italy ===
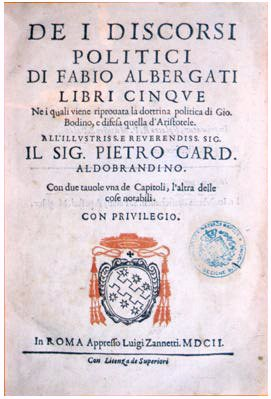
Bodin mentioned on the title page of Fabio Albergati's Discorsi politici, in 1602. Albergati wrote against Bodin from 1595, comparing his political theories unfavourably with those of Aristotle.

In Italy Bodin was seen as a secular historian like Machiavelli. At the time of the Venetian Interdict, Venetians agreed with the legislative definition of sovereignty. In particular Paolo Sarpi argued that Venice's limited size in territorial terms was not the relevant point for the actions it could undertake on its own authority.

Later Giambattista Vico was to take Bodin's cultural history approach noticeably further.

==== The Papacy ====
Works of Bodin were soon placed on the Index Librorum Prohibitorum for various reasons, including discussion of Fortune (against free will), and reason of state. The Methodus went on the Index in 1590; Robert Bellarmine as censor found it of some merit in its learning, but the author to be a heretic or atheist, critical of the papacy and much too sympathetic to Charles Du Moulin in particular. Other works followed in 1593. All his work was placed on the Index in 1628; the prohibition on the Theatrum continued into the 20th century. Venetian theologians were described as followers of Machiavelli and Bodin by Giovanni Amato.

Bellarmine's Tractatus de potestate summi pontificis in temporalibus reiterated, against Bodin's sovereignty theory, an indirect form of the traditional papal deposing power to release subjects from the duty of obedience to tyrants. Jakob Keller, in an apologetical work on behalf of limited justifications for tyrannicide, treated Bodin as a serious opponent on the argument that subjects can only resist a tyrant passively, with views on the Empire that were offensive.

=== In Spain ===
In 1583, Bodin was placed on the Quiroga Index. Against tyrannicide, Bodin's thought was out of step of conventional thinking in Spain at the time. It was recognized, in an unpublished dialogue imagined between Bodin and a jurist of Castile, that the government of Spain was harder than that of France, the other major European power, because of the more complex structure of the kingdom.

Jean Bodin's view of witchcraft was hardly known in Spain until the 18th century.

== See also ==
- Jeanne Harvilliers
- Antoine de Montchrestien
- Trois-Eschelles
