= Monopoly on violence =

Core legal concept and definition of a state

A Guatemalan policeman holding a suspect at gunpoint during a security checkpoint exercise. Due to the monopoly on violence held by the state, the policeman is allowed to use force and the threat of force legally where reasonable, while the suspect is not.

In political philosophy, a monopoly on violence or monopoly on the legal use of force is the property of a polity that is the only entity in its jurisdiction to legitimately use force, and thus the supreme authority of that area.

While the monopoly on violence as the defining conception of the state was first described in sociology by Max Weber in his essay Politics as a Vocation (1919), the monopoly of the legitimate use of physical force is a core concept of modern public law, which goes back to French jurist and political philosopher Jean Bodin's 1576 work Les Six livres de la République and English philosopher Thomas Hobbes's 1651 book Leviathan. Weber claims that the state is the "only human Gemeinschaft which lays claim to the monopoly on the legitimate use of physical force. As such, states can resort to coercive means such as incarceration, expropriation, humiliation, and death threats to obtain the population's compliance with its rule and thus maintain order. However, this monopoly is limited to a certain geographical area, and in fact this limitation to a particular area is one of the things that defines a state." In other words, Weber describes the state as any organization that succeeds in holding the exclusive right to use, threaten, or authorize physical force against residents of its territory. Such a monopoly, according to Weber, must occur via a process of legitimation.

== Max Weber's theory ==
Max Weber wrote in Politics as a Vocation that a fundamental characteristic of statehood is the claim of such a monopoly. An expanded definition appears in Economy and Society:

A compulsory political organization with continuous operations will be called a 'state' [if and] insofar as its administrative staff successfully upholds a claim to the monopoly of the legitimate use of physical force (das Monopol legitimen physischen Zwanges) in the enforcement of its order.

Weber applied several caveats to this definition:

- He intended the statement as a contemporary observation, noting that the connection between the state and the use of physical force has not always been so close. He uses the examples of feudalism, where private warfare was permitted under certain conditions, and of religious courts, which had sole jurisdiction over some types of offenses, especially heresy and sex crimes (thus the nickname "bawdy courts"). Regardless, the state exists wherever a single authority can legitimately authorize violence.
- For the same reasons, "monopoly" does not mean that only the government may use physical force, but that the state is that human community which successfully claims for itself to be the only source of legitimacy for all physical coercion or adjudication of coercion. For example, the law might permit individuals to use force in defense of one's self or property, but this right derives from the state's authority. This conflicts directly with enlightenment principles of individual sovereignty that delegates power to the state by consent, and concepts of natural law that hold that individual rights deriving from sapient self-ownership preexist the state and are only recognised and guaranteed by the state which may be restricted from limiting them by constitutional law.

== Relation to state capacity ==
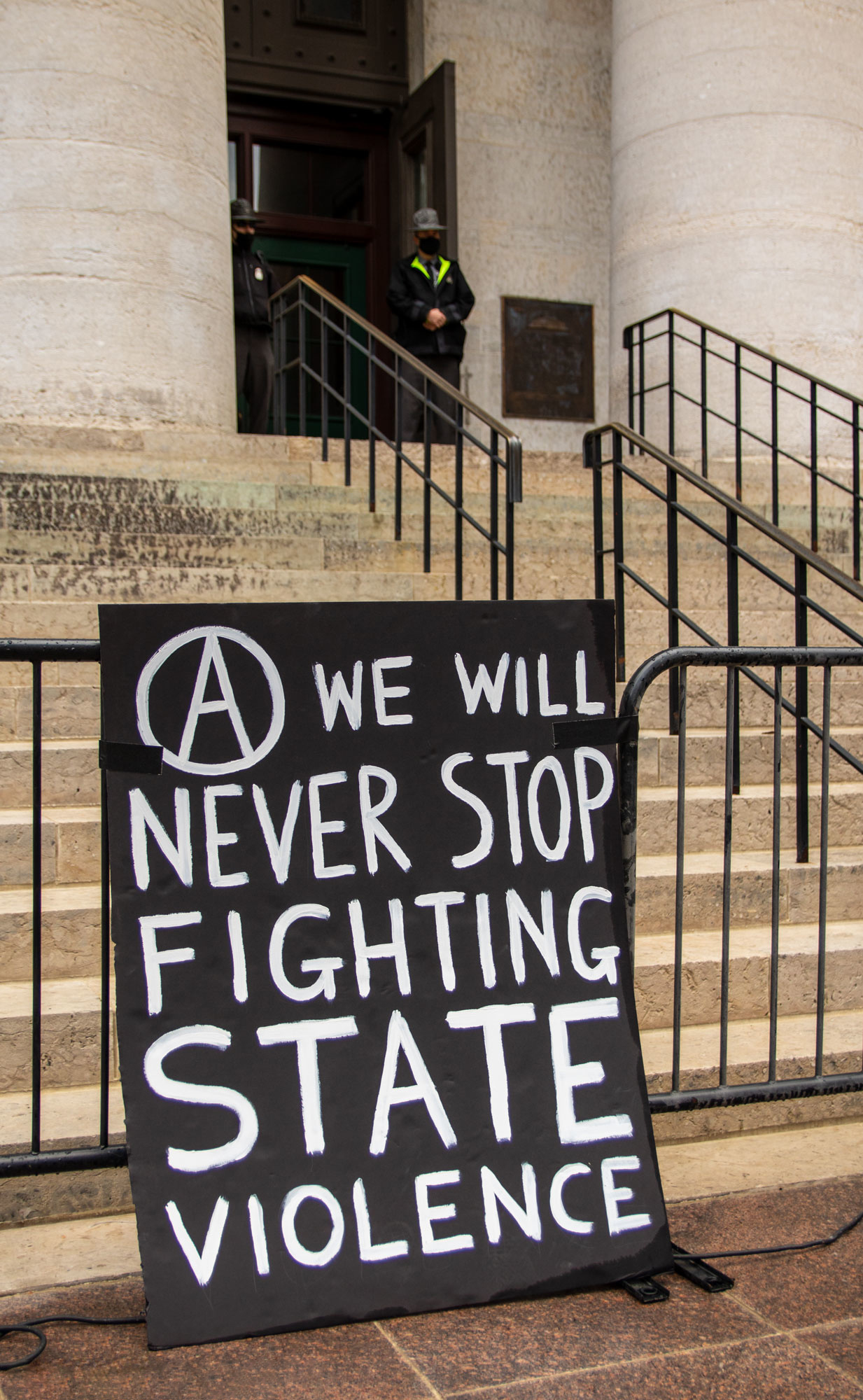
Anarchist placard at the Ohio Statehouse, 12 December 2020

The capacity of a state is often measured in terms of its fiscal and legal capacity, fiscal capacity meaning the state's ability to recover taxation, and legal capacity meaning the state's supremacy as sole arbiter of conflict resolution and contract enforcement. Without some sort of coercion, the state would not otherwise be able to enforce its legitimacy in its desired sphere of influence. In early and developing states, this role was often played by the "stationary bandit" who defended villagers from roving bandits, in the hope that the protection would incentivize villagers to invest in economic production, and the stationary bandit could eventually use its coercive power to expropriate some of that wealth.

The Italian philosopher-politician Benedetto Croce dramatically summarised the reality in one sentence: "Behind every law stands a pistol".

In regions where the state does not establish full control of violence, non-state actors such as the Sicilian Mafia in southern Italy create and fill a market for private protection.

In unorganized and underground markets, violence is used to enforce contracts in the absence of accessible legal conflict resolution. Charles Tilly continues this comparison to say that warmaking and statemaking are actually the best representations of what organized crime can grow into. The relationship between the state, markets and violence has been noted as having a direct relationship, using violence as a form of coercion. Anarchists view a direct relationship between capitalism, authority, and the state; the notion of a monopoly of violence is largely connected to anarchist philosophy of rejection of all unjustified hierarchy.

== Other ==
According to Raymond Aron, international relations are characterized by the absence of widely acknowledged legitimacy in the use of force between states.

Martha Lizabeth Phelps takes Weber's ideas on the legitimacy of private security a step further, claiming that the use of private actors by the state remains legitimate if and only if military contractors are perceived as being controlled by the state.

In the Encyclopedia of Violence, Peace, & Conflict, Jon D. Wiseman points out that a state's monopoly on violence is conferred by the people of that state in exchange for protection of their person and property, which in turn grants states the ability to coerce and exploit people through, for example, taxation.

== See also ==
- Coercion
- Police power (United States constitutional law)
- "Political power grows out of the barrel of a gun"
- Power (social and political)
