= Absolutism (European history) =

Form of unrestrained monarchical power

King Louis XIV of France, often considered by historians as an archetype of absolutism

Absolutism or the Age of Absolutism (c. 1610 – c. 1789) is a historiographical term used to describe a form of monarchical power that is unrestrained by all other institutions, such as churches, legislatures, or social elites. The term 'absolutism' is typically used in conjunction with some European monarchs during the transition from feudalism to capitalism, and monarchs described as absolute can especially be found in the 16th century through the 19th century with several notable and important Medieval precursors. Absolutism is characterized by the ending of feudal partitioning, consolidation of power with the monarch, rise of state power, unification of the state laws, and a decrease in the influence of the church and the nobility.

Historian Martyn Rady argues absolutism was a term applied post-hoc to monarchs before the French Revolution, with the adjective 'absolute' going back to the Middle Ages. Deriving from the Latin absolutus or 'absolved', it had a predominantly legal meaning, describing power that took no heed of the law's constraints.

Absolute monarchs are also associated with the rise of professional standing armies, professional bureaucracies, the codification of state laws, and the rise of ideologies that justify the absolutist monarchy. Absolutist monarchs typically were considered to have the divine right of kings as a cornerstone of the philosophy that justified their power (as opposed to the previous order when the kings were considered vassals of the pope and the emperor).

Absolute monarchs spent considerable sums on extravagant houses for themselves and their nobles. In an absolutist state, monarchs often required nobles to live in the royal palace, while state officials ruled the nobles' lands in their absence. This was designed to reduce the effective power of the nobility by causing nobles to become reliant upon the largesse of the monarch for their livelihoods.

There is a considerable variety of opinion by historians on the extent of absolutism among European monarchs. Some, such as Perry Anderson, argue that quite a few monarchs achieved levels of absolutist control over their states, while historians such as Roger Mettam dispute the very concept of absolutism. In general, historians who disagree with the appellation of absolutism argue that most monarchs labeled as absolutist exerted no greater power over their subjects than other non-absolutist rulers, and these historians tend to emphasize the differences between the absolutist rhetoric of monarchs and the realities of the effective use of power by these absolute monarchs. The Renaissance historian William Bouwsma summed up this contradiction: "Nothing so clearly indicates the limits of royal power as the fact that governments were perennially in financial trouble, unable to tap the wealth of those most able to pay, and likely to stir up a costly revolt whenever they attempted to develop an adequate income."

== Monarchs often depicted as absolute rulers ==
Portrait	Name	Nickname	Country	Reign
	Frederick II	the Wonder of the World (Latin: Stupor Mundi)	Kingdom of Sicily Holy Roman Empire	1198–1250
	Philip IV	the Fair or the Iron King	Kingdom of France	1285–1314
	Louis XI	the Universal Spider or the Cunning	Kingdom of France	1461–1483
	Henry VIII	–	Kingdom of England	1509–1547
	Charles V	–	(Holy Roman Empire); Holy Roman Empire (Spain); Spanish Empire	1516–1558
	Philip II	the Prudent	(Spain); Spanish Empire	1556–1598
	Elizabeth I	the Virgin Queen	Kingdom of England	1558–1603
	Louis XIII	the Just	Kingdom of France	1610–1643
	Louis XIV	the Sun King	Kingdom of France	1643–1715
	Frederick III	–	(Denmark–Norway); Kingdom of Denmark-Norway	1648–1670
	Leopold I	–	Holy Roman Empire	1658–1705
	Charles XI	–	(Sweden); Swedish Empire	1660–1697
	Peter I	the Great	(Russian Empire); Tsardom of Russia	1682–1725
	John V	the Magnanimous or the Portuguese Sun King	Kingdom of Portugal	1706–1750
	Charles XII	Carolus Rex	(Sweden); Swedish Empire	1697–1718
	Frederick II	the Great	Kingdom of Prussia	1740–1786
	Catherine II	the Great	Russian Empire	1762–1796
	Joseph II	–	Holy Roman Empire	1765–1790
	Miguel I of Portugal	the Traditionalist (Note: Other nicknames include The Absolutist and The Usurper)	Kingdom of Portugal	1828–1834

== Characteristics of "absolutism" ==
The nationalization process, which manifested itself, among other things, in the formation of standing armies, the establishment of a bureaucratic apparatus dependent solely on the ruler, the integration of the church into the state and a mercantilist economic system, is a characteristic of "absolutism". In addition, there would have been a change in the self-image of the baroque prince to an intensification of court life, which reached its heyday at the Versailles court of Louis XIV.

"Absolutism" is still commonly described as a widespread form of rule in Europe, which reached its peak in the Baroque era. This type of typification began with the historian Wilhelm Roscher, who first attempted to periodize the "absolutist age" in the 19th century and to assign the enlightened epoch a separate historical position. He put forward the thesis of a series of stages that begins with denominational absolutism, turns into courtly absolutism and finally ends in enlightened absolutism. The prime example of "courtly absolutism" is the rule of the French King Louis XIV. Later, pure "absolutism" developed into so-called "enlightened absolutism", in which general well-being became the primary goal of the otherwise absolute ruling monarch: The King saw himself as the first servant of his state (self-description by Frederick II of Prussia).

== Philosophical foundation of absolutism ==
While the rulers claimed to have received their power by the grace of God, the original absolutism was already theoretically founded by the French jurist and professor of law Jean Bodin (1530–1596) as a response to the writings of the monarchists. Bodin first formulated the thesis of sovereignty, according to which the state – represented by the monarch - has the task of directing the common interests of several households in the right direction and thus exercising their sovereign power, that is, the state represents an absolute, indivisible and perpetual. Furthermore, in his work Six Books of the Republic, he stated the sovereign's claim to omnipotence, on the basis of which the later absolutist systems of rule were built. However, Bodin did not grant the absolutist rulers a right to princely arbitrariness, but rather demanded in his works respect for natural rights, the divine commandments and the protection of family and property.

== Enlightened absolutism ==
Enlightened absolutism (also called enlightened despotism) refers to the conduct and policies of European absolute monarchs during the 18th and early 19th centuries who were influenced by the ideas of the Enlightenment, espousing them to enhance their power. The concept originated during the Enlightenment period in the 18th and into the early 19th centuries. The term usually refers to an authoritarian leader who exercised their political power based upon the principles of the Enlightenment.

Enlightened monarchs distinguished themselves from ordinary rulers by claiming to rule for their subjects' well-being. John Stuart Mill stated that despotism is a legitimate mode of government in dealing with barbarians, provided the end be their improvement.

Enlightened absolutists' beliefs about royal power were typically similar to those of regular despots, both believing that they were destined to rule. Enlightened rulers may have played a part in the abolition of serfdom in Europe.

The enlightened despotism of Emperor Joseph II of the Holy Roman Empire is summarized as, "Everything for the people, nothing by the people".

== See also ==
- Absolute monarchy
- Sovereignty
- Thomas Hobbes (17th century theorist)
- Divine right of kings
- King's Law

== Bibliography ==
- Anderson, Perry. Lineages of the Absolutist State. London: Verso, 1974.
- Kimmel, Michael S. Absolutism and Its Discontents: State and Society in Seventeenth-Century France and England. New Brunswick, NJ: Transaction Books, 1988.
- Mettam, Roger. Power and Faction in Louis XIV's France. New York: Blackwell Publishers, 1988.
- Mill, John Stuart (1989). J. S. Mill: 'On Liberty' and Other Writings. Cambridge University Press. ISBN 978-0-521-37917-5.
- Miller, John (ed.). Absolutism in Seventeenth Century Europe. New York: Palgrave Macmillan, 1990.
- Perry, Marvin; Chase, Myrna; Jacob, James; Jacob, Margaret; Daly, Jonathan (2015). Western Civilization: Ideas, Politics, and Society, Volume I: To 1789. Cengage Learning. ISBN 978-1-305-44548-2.
- Wilson, Peter H. Absolutism in Central Europe. New York: Routledge, 2000.
- Zmora, Hillay. Monarchy, Aristocracy, and the State in Europe – 1300–1800. New York: Routledge, 2001.
