= Jean-Paul Perrin =

French preacher and Protestant historian

Jean-Paul Perrin (1580-?), sometimes incorrectly called Jean Paul Perrin Lionnois as he was originally from Lyon, was a French preacher and Protestant historian in the 16th and 17th centuries, and pastor of a congregation at Nyons in Dauphiné.

== Works ==
He is best known for his Histoire des Vaudois, commissioned by the Provincial Synod of the Reformed Church of Dauphiné in March 1605, completed around 1609 and published on January 1, 1618, in Geneva.

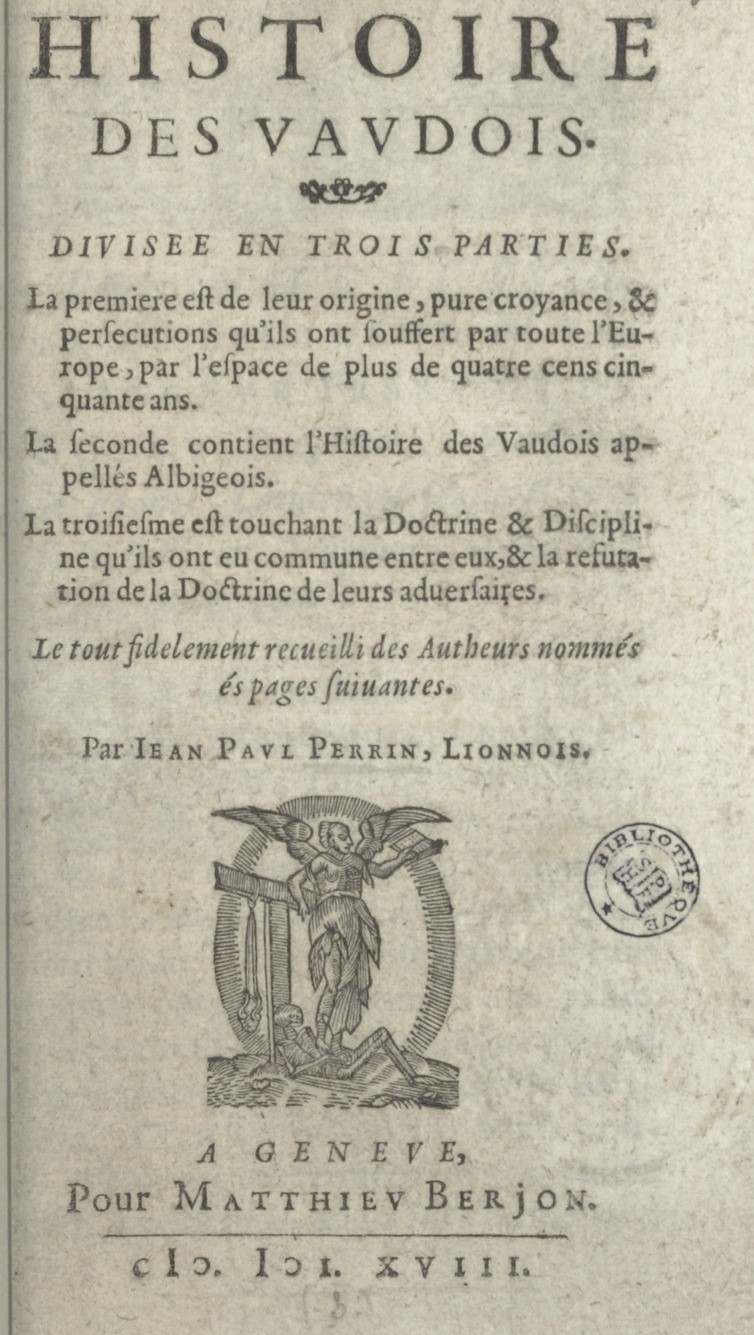

This 596-page work, also known as Histoire des Chrestiens Albigeois, is based on numerous sources gathered mainly between 1602 and 1603 by Calvinists (including some Waldenses) with a view to defending the thesis that the Roman Catholic Church is not descended from the primitive Church, but has departed from it, unlike the Albigenses and the Waldenses and other groups before them, who, according to Perrin, would have maintained the true faith particularly in the Alpine valleys and would have mostly rallied to the Protestant Reformation or Anabaptism in the 16th century.

Despite the fact that most of these original sources disappeared following the dragonnades, this work is considered highly credible by historians for several reasons: it was revised by numerous Protestant pastors from Southern France over a period of 9 years; it often overlaps with the writings of Jean Crespin, Nicolas Vignier and Philips of Marnix; it served as a reference for the writings of Thieleman Van Braght (Martyrs Mirror, 1660), Jean Léger (Histoire générale des Églises Évangéliques des Vallées du Piémont ou Vaudoises, 1669) or Antoine Monastier (Histoire de l'Église Vaudoise, 1847).
