= Jeanne Harvilliers =

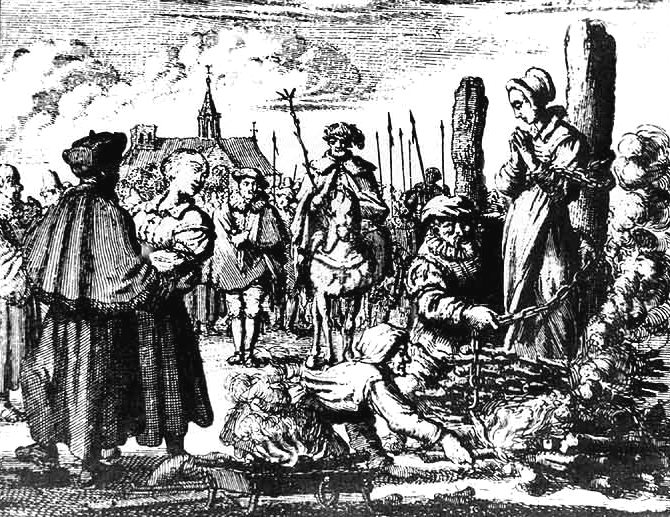
Woman being burned at the stake in the 16th-century, just like Jeanne Harvilliers. (The woman depicted is Maria van Beckum).

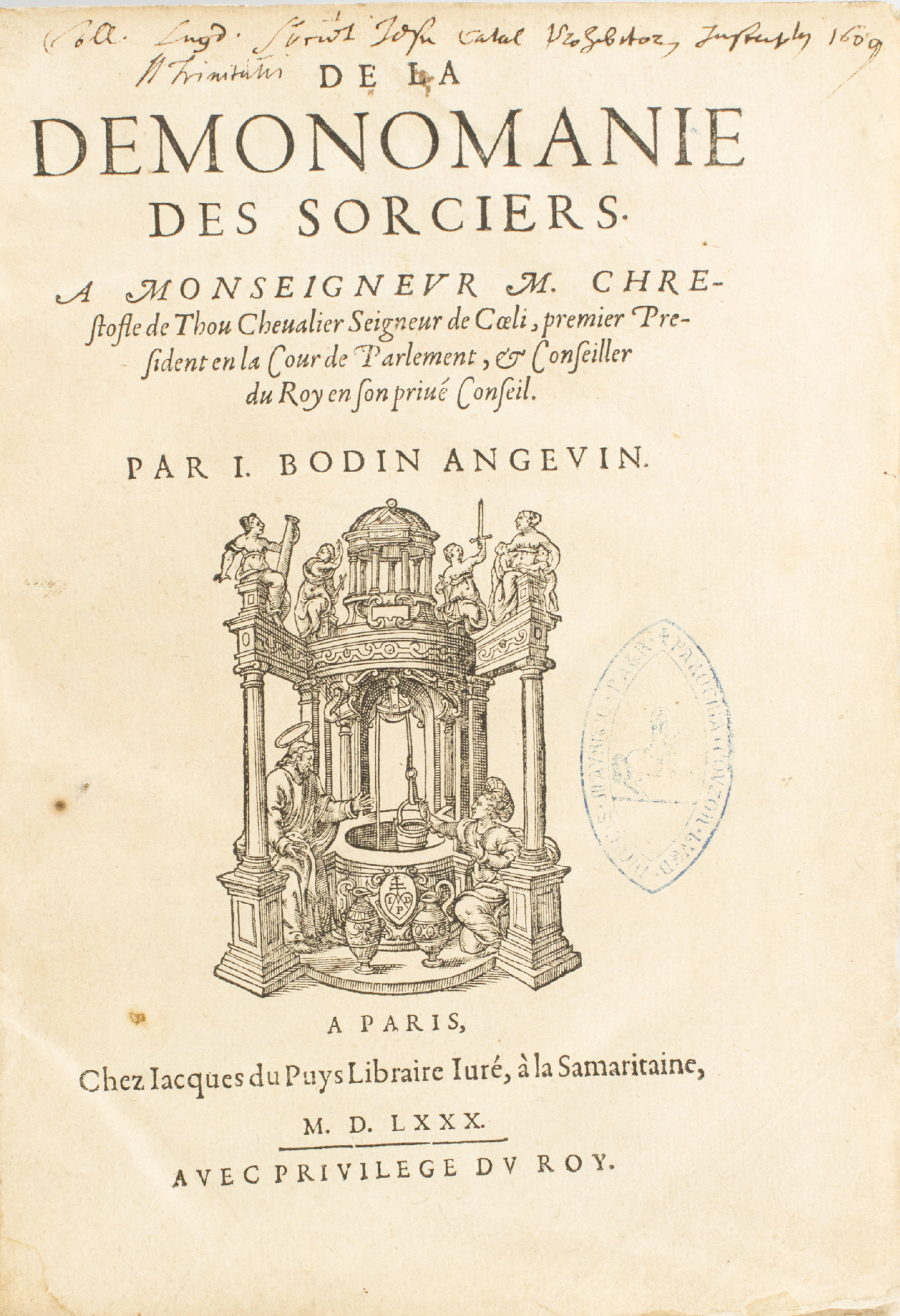
Title page of De la démonomanie des sorciers (1580), were Jeanne Harvilliers appears.

Jeanne Harvilliers (c. 1528 – 30 April 1578), was a French alleged witch, known as sorcière de Ribemont ('the witch of Ribemont') or la sorcière de Verberie ('the witch of Verberie'). She was executed for sorcery by burning in Ribemont. Jean Bodin presided at her trial and used her case as a reference case in his famous book about witch hunting, De la démonomanie des sorciers (1580).

== Biography ==
She was born in Verberie to a vagrant prostitute mother. She and her mother were both arrested in Senlis in 1548, where her mother was burned at the stake for sorcery. She herself admitted and repented, because of which she was whipped and released. She lived as a vagrant, frequently changed her name, and performed alleged magical tasks for money. She married a man in Laonnois and had a daughter, Rosalie. In 1578, she was arrested changed for having caused the illness and death of the local farmer François Preudhomme. Villagers reported her for having cast a spell on Preudhomme, who claimed to have felt sick after passing her. She acted as the nurse of François Preudhomme during his illness, and promised to cure him. She failed, and François Preudhomme died. After his death, she was arrested when she was hiding in a barn.

Jean Bodin described her:

"You could still see the remains of her former beauty. Dark skin. Big eyes who shone with a fire, energy and sparkle you could hardly bare, un aquiline profile, truly exquisite features, teeth which enamel reminded you of pearls, and hair, once black as the feathers of the raven, now gray, which flowed long and undulating around her body, forming a astonishing beauty, which in combination with the peculiar dress stood out among the other inhabitants of the district."

During her interrogation, she made a long confession, which was described in full by her judge, Jean Bodin. In the confession, she claimed to have been initiated to sorcery by her mother at age twelve, who introduced her to the Devil, whom she described as a man in black. She confessed to have attended the satan's sabbath and having a sexual relationship with Satan ever since. She said that Satan gave her permission to marry. She also confessed to having caused the illness of François Preudhomme. She claimed that she had been hired by the farmer André Brulart to cast a spell on François Preudhomme because Preudhomme had abused Brulart's daughter, and that she had done so with the help of a powder she was given by the Devil. When she nursed Preudhomme, she asked the Devil to help her cure Preudhomme again. When he answered it was impossible, she asked him to leave, and he answered that he would never come again.

Jeanne Harvilliers was burnt alive at the stake for sorcery in Ribemont on 30 April 1578. Her exact words on the day of execution was described by Jean Bodin:

”Farewell, may heaven forgive you. During my life, I was an Egyptian, a girl, a vagabond; I was banished, I was beaten with canes, I was marked with iron; I begged for bread from door to door; I was hunted from village to village like a dog. Who then would have believed my words? But today, fettered to the stake, ready to die, my words will not fall on the ground. Believe this call of truth: I am innocent of the crimes ascribed to me, I have done nothing to warrant the treatment given to me".

== Legacy ==
She was depicted by Judith Magre who played Jeanne Harvilliers in the TV-show Jeanne ou la Revolte by Luc Godevais in 1974.

== See also ==
- Des Eschelles Manseau, also a reference case in the De la démonomanie des sorciers by Jean Bodin.
