= Pierre Grégoire =

Pierre Grégoire may refer to:

- Pierre Grégoire (politician)
- Pierre Grégoire (jurist)
