= Des Eschelles Manseau =

French magician executed for witchcraft

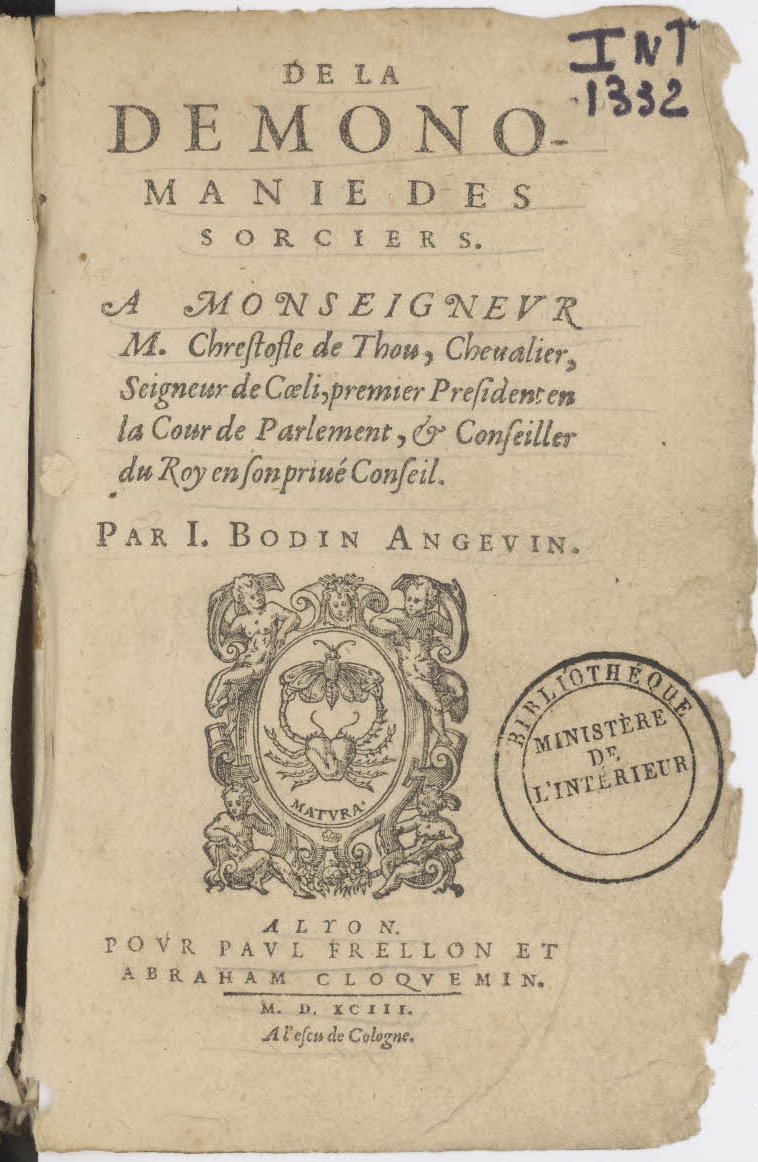
Eschelles appears in De la démonomanie des sorciers; title page of 1593 edition at the Archives nationales in France

Des Eschelles Manseau, also known as Trois-Eschelles (died 1571), was a French magician who was executed for witchcraft.

== Biography ==
Trois-Eschelles was from Maine. He appears to have been performing as a magician and claimed to be able to perform magic. He performed before the king, Charles IX of France, at the royal court, where he attracted a lot of attention. He was however exiled from the royal court by the king.

He was arrested and charged with sorcery. He was accused of having performed "impossible acts". Gaspard II de Coligny commented that Trois-Eschelles was arrested after having poisoned the bed of two male courtiers. He was sentenced to death of witchcraft. The king pardoned him on condition that he revealed his accomplices. He exposed 150 people for witchcraft by identifying the Devil's mark on their bodies. Only a handful of those people he identified where actually arrested and executed, among them Honoré or Honorat de Quinze-Vingts.

The king brought him back to court, where he was made to entertain the courtiers with stories about witchcraft, the witche's sabbath, sorcery and poison. His tenure at court does not appear to have lasted long, however, and he was reportedly eventually executed by hanging despite the initial clemency of the king.

== Legacy ==
Trois-Eschelles was noted as an important witchcraft case by Jean Bodin, who referred to him eleven times in Démonomanie des sorciers. Jean Bodin claimed that the wizard Des Eschelles Manseau named between 100,000 and 300,000 wizards and that the clemency of the king toward Trois-Eschelles was an illustrative example on what could happen when princes did not take sorcery seriously, and how the whole kingdom was in danger of being placed in danger by the wizards because of the clemency of the king.

== See also ==
- Toussaint le Juge
- Jeanne Harvilliers, also a reference case in the De la démonomanie des sorciers by Jean Bodin
