= Names of Rus', Russia and Ruthenia =

The word Rus' or Rus referred initially to a group of Scandinavian Vikings, also known as Varangians, who founded the medieval state of Kievan Rus' in Eastern Europe in the 10th century. The term gradually acquired the meaning of the aforementioned dynastic polity itself, and also the geographic region of its heartlands Kiev, Pereiaslavl' and Chernihiv. Russia is a Hellenized rendering of the same word, and Ruthenia is its Latinized form.

Following the decline of Kievan Rus' in the 12th century, its territory fragmented into multiple polities. The northeastern principality of Vladimir-Suzdal played a crucial role in the eventual rise of the Grand Duchy of Moscow, which, by the 14th to 16th centuries, had consolidated power over most of northeastern Rus'. The name Russia began to appear in official documents during this time, alongside the older term Rus'. By the 15th century, Muscovite rulers adopted the title "Grand Prince of all Rus'," signaling their claim over the legacy of Kievan Rus'. The term Russia gradually replaced Rus', and by the 16th century, under Ivan IV, the state officially became the Tsardom of Russia. Despite this, the term Muscovy persisted in Europe, especially in Latin Catholic regions, but Russia was increasingly recognized across Northern Europe and the courts of the Holy Roman Empire.

The name Ruthenia originated as a Latinized form of Rus' and was commonly used in Western European documents to refer to the eastern Slavic lands during medieval times. Over time, the name became more localized, especially after the 19th century, to refer to Carpathian Ruthenia—a region in the northeastern Carpathian Mountains inhabited by Slavs with a Rusyn identity.

Initially the ecclesiastical title "Metropolitan of Kiev and all Rus'" was used for the head of the church based in Kiev until the metropolitan see moved to Moscow in the 14th century, where it became "Patriarch of Moscow and all Rus'" with the establishment of the Russian Orthodox Church. In contrast, the southwestern regions of former Kievan Rus' adopted the title "Metropolitan of Kiev, Galicia and all Ruthenia", while modern Ukrainian Orthodox churches have shifted to using titles reflecting "Ukraine" instead of "Rus'."

== Etymology ==
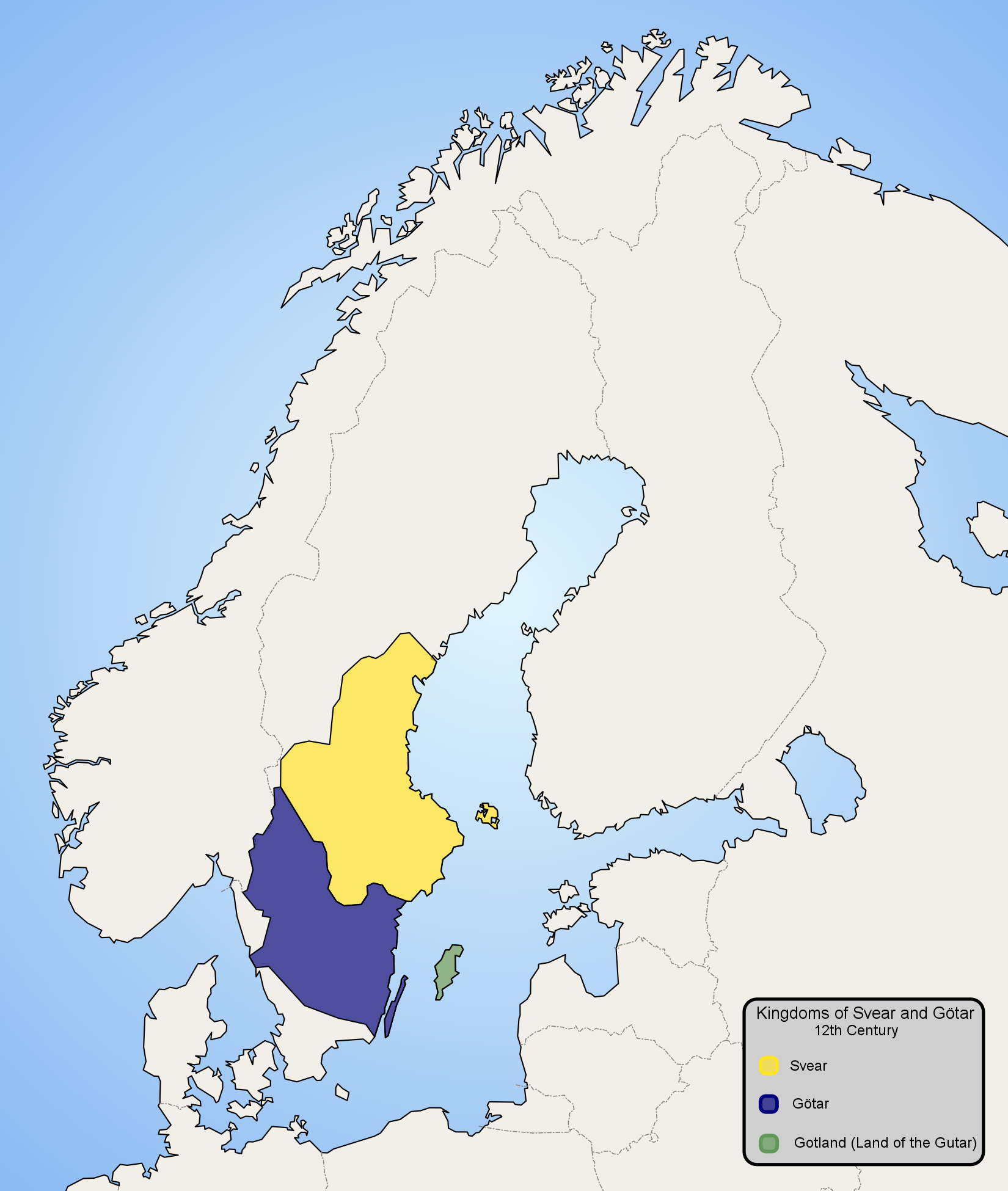
Scandinavia with what later became Sweden, here in the 9th century. Roslagen is located in Uppland, the southeastern part of the yellow area of Svealand. Swedes Geats Gotlanders

The most common theory about the origins of the name Rus' is the Germanic version. The name Rus', like the Proto-Finnic name for Sweden (*roocci), supposed to be descended from an Old Norse term for "the men who row" (rods-) as rowing was the main method of navigating the rivers of Eastern Europe, and that it could be linked to the Swedish coastal area of Roslagen or Roden, as it was known in earlier times. The name Rus' would then have the same origin as the Finnish, Estonian, Võro and Northern Sami names for Sweden: Ruotsi, Rootsi, Roodsi and Ruoŧŧa. The local Finnic and Permic peoples in northern Russia proper use the same (Rus'-related) name both for Sweden and Russia (depending on the language): thus the Veps name for Sweden and Swedish is Ročinma / Ročin, while in the Komi language spoken further east the etymologically corresponding term Roćmu / Roć means already Russia and Russian instead. The Finnish scholar Tor Karsten has pointed out that the territory of present-day Uppland, Södermanland and Östergötland in ancient times was known as Roðer or roðin. Thomsen accordingly has suggested that Roðer probably derived from roðsmenn or roðskarlar, meaning seafarers or rowers. Ivar Aasen, the Norwegian philologist and lexicographer, noted proto-Germanic root variants Rossfolk, Rosskar, Rossmann.

George Vernadsky theorized about the association of Rus and Alans. He claimed that Ruxs in Alanic means "radiant light", thus the ethnonym Roxolani could be understood as "bright Alans". He theorized that the name Roxolani a combination of two separate tribal names: the Rus and the Alans.

According to the Oxford English Dictionary, the English name Russia first appeared in the 14th century, borrowed from Medieval Latin Russia, which was in turn a rendition of the Byzantine Greek name for Rus', Ρωσία (Rosía). The word Ruthenia originated as a Latin designation of the region its people called Rus'. Rusia or Ruthenia appears in the 1520 Latin treatise Mores, leges et ritus omnium gentium, per Ioannem Boëmum, Aubanum, Teutonicum ex multis clarissimis rerum scriptoribus collecti by Johann Boemus. In the chapter De Rusia sive Ruthenia, et recentibus Rusianorum moribus ("About Rus', or Ruthenia, and modern customs of the Rus'"), Boemus tells of a country extending from the Baltic Sea to the Caspian Sea and from the Don River to the northern ocean. It is a source of beeswax, its forests harbor many animals with valuable fur, and the capital city Moscow (Moscovia), named after the Moskva River (Moscum amnem), is 14 miles in circumference. Danish diplomat Jacob Ulfeldt, who traveled to Russia in 1578 to meet with Tsar Ivan IV, titled his posthumously (1608) published memoir Hodoeporicon Ruthenicum ("Voyage to Ruthenia").

=== Early evidence ===
In Old East Slavic literature, the East Slavs refer to themselves as "[muzhi] ruskie" ("Rus' men") or, rarely, "rusichi." The East Slavs are thought to have adopted this name from the Varangian elite, which was first mentioned in the 830s in the Annales Bertiniani. The Annales recount that Louis the Pious's court at Ingelheim am Rhein in 839 (the same year as the first appearance of Varangians in Constantinople), was visited by a delegation from the Byzantine emperor. The delegates included two men who called themselves "Rhos" ("Rhos vocari dicebant"). Louis inquired about their origins and learned that they were Swedes. Fearing that they were spies for their brothers the Danes, he jailed them. They were also mentioned in the 860s by Byzantine Patriarch Photius under the name "Rhos."

Rusiyyah or Rūs (روس) was used by Ahmad ibn Fadlan for what was assumed to be Varangians he met by the Volga River, and by the Persian traveler Ahmad ibn Rustah who visited Veliky Novgorod and described how the Rus' exploited the Slavs.

As for the Rus, they live on an island ... that takes three days to walk round and is covered with thick undergrowth and forests; it is most unhealthy... They harry the Slavs, using ships to reach them; they carry them off as slaves and... sell them. They have no fields but simply live on what they get from the Slav's lands... When a son is born, the father will go up to the newborn baby, sword in hand; throwing it down, he says, "I shall not leave you with any property: You have only what you can provide with this weapon."

When the Varangians arrived in Constantinople, the Byzantines considered and described the Rhos (Greek Ῥῶς) as a different people from the Slavs.

The earliest written mention of the word Rus' appears in the Primary Chronicle under the year 912. When describing the peace treaty signed by the Varangian Oleg of Novgorod during his campaign on Constantinople, it contains the following passage, "Oleg sent his men to make peace and sign a treaty between the Greeks and the Rus', saying thus: [...] "We are the Rus': Karl, Inegeld, Farlaf, Veremud, Rulav, Gudi, Ruald, Karn, Frelav, Ruar, Aktevu, Truan, Lidul, Vost, Stemid, sent by Oleg, the great prince of Rus', and all those under him[.]"

Later the Primary Chronicle states that they conquered Kiev and created what is now called Kievan Rus'. The territory they conquered was named after them as were, eventually, the local people (cf. Normans).

However, the Synod Scroll of the Novgorod First Chronicle, which is partly based on the original list of the late 11th Century and partly on the Primary Chronicle, does not name the Varangians asked by the Chuds, Slavs and Krivichs to reign their obstreperous lands as the "Rus'". One can assume that there was no original mention of the Varangians as the Rus' due to the old list predating the Primary Chronicle and the Synod Scroll only referred to the Primary Chronicle if the pages of the old list were blemished.

Other spellings used in Europe during the 9th and 10th centuries were as follows: Ruzi, Ruzzi, Ruzia and Ruzari. Sources written in Latin routinely confused the Rus' with the Rugii, an ancient East Germanic tribe related to the Goths. Olga of Kiev, for instance, was called "queen of the Rugii" (regina Rugorum) in the Lotharingian Chronicle compiled by the anonymous continuator of Regino of Prüm.

=== Alternate anti-Normanist theories ===
A number of alternative etymologies have been suggested. These are derived from the "anti-Normanist" school of thought in Russian historiography during the 19th century and in the Soviet era. These hypotheses are considered unlikely in Western mainstream academia. Slavic and Iranian etymologies suggested by "anti-Normanist" scholars include:

- The Roxolani, a Sarmatian (i. e., Iranian) people who inhabited southern Ukraine, Moldova and Romania.
- Several river-names in the region contain the element rus/ros and these might be the origin of the name of the Rus'. In Ukraine, the Ros and Rusna, near Kiev and Pereiaslav, respectively, whose names are derived from a postulated Slavic term for "water", akin to rosa (dew), rusalka (water nymph), ruslo (stream bed). (A relation of rosa to the Sanskrit rasā́- "liquid, juice; mythical river" suggests itself; compare Avestan Raŋhā "mythical stream" and the ancient name of the Volga River, Ῥᾶ Rā, from a cognate Scythian name).
- Rusiy (Русый), light-brown, said of hair color (the translation "reddish-haired", cognate with the Slavic "ryzhiy", "red-haired", is not quite exact).
- A postulated proto-Slavic word for "bear", cognate with arctos and ursus.

The name Rus' may have originated from the Iranian name of the Volga River (by F. Knauer, Moscow 1901).

The Russian-American historian, George Vernadsky, has suggested a derivation from the Roxolani, stating that the first part of the name Roxolani comes from the Iranian "rukhs", meaning "light" and thus the name Roxolani meant "the light Alans".

The Russian linguist Igor Danilevsky, in his Ancient Rus as Seen by Contemporaries and Descendants, argued against these theories, stating that the anti-Normanists neglected the realities of the Ancient Slavic languages and that the nation name Rus' could not have arisen from any of the proposed origins.

- The populace of the Ros River would have been known as Roshane;
- Red-haired or bear-origined people would have ended their self-name with the plural -ane or -ichi, and not with the singular -s' (red hair is one of the natural hair colors of Scandinavians and other Germanic peoples);
- Most theories are based on a Ros- root, and in Ancient Slavic an o would never have become the u in Rus'.

Danilevskiy further argued that the term followed the general pattern of Slavic names for neighboring Finnic peoples—the Chud', Ves', Perm', Sum', etc.—but that the only possible word that it could be based on, Ruotsi, presented a historical dead-end, since no such tribal or national name was known from non-Slavic sources. "Ruotsi" is, however, the Finnish name for Sweden. Danilevskiy shows that the oldest historical source, the Primary Chronicle, is inconsistent in what it refers to as the "Rus'": in adjacent passages, the Rus' are grouped with Varangians, with the Slavs, and also set apart from the Slavs and Varangians. Danilevskiy suggests that the Rus' were originally not a nation but a social class, which can explain the irregularities in the Primary Chronicle and the lack of early non-Slavic sources.

== From Rus' to Russia ==
In modern English historiography, common names for the ancient East Slavic state include Kievan Rus, (sometimes retaining the apostrophe in Rus', a transliteration of the soft sign, ь), or Kievan Ruthenia. The term Kievan Rus' was established by modern historians to distinguish the period from the 9th century to the beginning of the 12th century, when Kiev was the center of a large state.

Initially, the Rus' lands referred only to the Middle Dnieper region centered on Kiev, and forming a triangle with Pereiaslav, and Chernihiv. The 12th century chroniclers "record princes from Vladimir–Suzdal’ in the Northeast, Novgorod in the North, and Galicia–Volhynia in the Southwest, among others, as going to the Rus’ Land when Kiev is meant." This narrow usage of Rus’ ceased after the Mongols conquered Kiev in the second half of the thirteenth century. The vast polity of Kievan Rus' was subsequently divided by geographical distance into several more distant principalities. The most influential were, in the south-west, Kingdom of Galicia–Volhynia, in the north, the Novgorod Republic, and in the north-east, Vladimir-Suzdal.

=== Northeast principalities ===
In the 14th–16th centuries most of northeastern Rus' principalities were united under the power of the Grand Duchy of Moscow, once a part of Vladimir-Suzdal, and formed a large state. While the oldest endonyms were Rus' (Russian: Русь) and the Rus' land or Russian land (Russian: Русская земля, romanized: Russkaia zemlia), a new form of its name, Rusia or Russia, appeared in the 15th century, and became common thereafter. In the 1480s Muscovite state scribes Ivan Cherny and Mikhail Medovartsev mention Russia under the name "Росиа"', Medovartsev also mentions "the sceptre of Russian lordship (Росийскаго господства)". In the following century Russia co-existed with the old name Rus' and appeared in an inscription on the western portal of the Transfiguration Cathedral of the Spaso-Preobrazhensky Monastery in Yaroslavl (1515), on the icon case of the Theotokos of Vladimir (1514), in the work by Maximus the Greek, the Russian Chronograph written by Dosifei Toporkov (?–1543/44) in 1516–22 and in other sources.

By the 15th century, the rulers of the Grand Duchy of Moscow had incorporated the northern parts of the former Kievan Rus'. Ivan III of Moscow was the first local ruler to claim the title of "Grand Prince of all Rus'" This title was used by the Grand Dukes of Vladimir since the early 14th century, and the first prince to use it was Mikhail of Tver. Ivan III was styled by Maximilian I, Holy Roman Emperor as rex albus and rex Russiae. Later, Rus' — in the Russian language specifically — evolved into the Byzantine-influenced form, Rossiya (Russia is Ῥωσσία (Rhōssía) in Greek).

=== Tsardom of Russia ===
In 1547, Ivan IV assumed the title of "Tsar and Grand Duke of all Rus'" (Царь и Великий князь всея Руси) and was crowned on 16 January, thereby proclaiming the Tsardom of Russia, or "the Great Russian Tsardom", as it was called in the coronation document, by the Ecumenical Patriarch of Constantinople Jeremiah II and in numerous official texts, but the state partly remained referred to as Moscovia (English: Muscovy) throughout Europe, predominantly in its Catholic part, though this Latin version of the term was never used in Russia, instead it was referred as Moscow State (Russian: Московское государство. The two names "Russia" and "Moscovia" appear to have co-existed as interchangeable during the later 16th and throughout the 17th century with different Western maps and sources using different names, so that the country was called "Russia, or Moscovia" (Latin: Russia seu Moscovia) or "Russia, popularly known as Moscovia" (Latin: Russia vulgo Moscovia). In England of the 16th century, it was known both as Russia and Muscovy. Such notable Englishmen as Giles Fletcher the Elder, author of the book Of the Russe Common Wealth (1591), and Samuel Collins, author of The Present State of Russia (1668), both of whom visited Russia, were familiar with the term Russia and used it in their works. So did numerous other authors, including John Milton, who wrote A brief history of Moscovia and of other less-known countries lying eastward of Russia, published posthumously, starting it with the words: "The Empire of Moscovia, or as others call it, Russia...".

In the Russian Tsardom, the word Russia replaced the old name Rus' in official documents, though the names Rus' and Russian land were still common and synonymous to it, and often appeared in the form Great Russia (Russian: Великая Россия), which is more typical of the 17th century, whereas the state was also known as Great-Russian Tsardom (Russian: Великороссийское царствие).

According to historians like Alexander Zimin and Anna Khoroshkevich, the continuous use of the term Moscovia was a result of traditional habit. The term Moscovia was used in many parts of Europe prior to the reign of Peter I. In Northern Europe and at the court of the Holy Roman Empire, however, the country was also known under name Russia or Rossia. Sigismund von Herberstein, ambassador of the Holy Roman Emperor in Russia, used both Russia and Moscovia in his work on the Russian tsardom and noted: "The majority believes that Russia is a changed name of Roxolania. Muscovites ("Russians" in the German version) refute this, saying that their country was originally called Russia (Rosseia)". Pointing to the difference between Latin and Russian names, French captain Jacques Margeret, who served in Russia and left a detailed description of L'Empire de Russie of the early 17th century that was presented to King Henry IV, stated that foreigners make "a mistake when they call them Muscovites and not Russians. When they are asked what nation they are, they respond 'Russac', which means 'Russians', and when they are asked what place they are from, the answer is Moscow, Vologda, Ryasan and other cities". The closest analogue of the Latin term Moscovia in Russia was "Tsardom of Moscow", or "Moscow Tsardom" (Московское царство), which was used along with the name "Russia", sometimes in one sentence, as in the name of the 17th century Russian work On the Great and Glorious Russian Moscow State (Russian: О великом и славном Российском Московском государстве).

== From Rus' to Ruthenia ==
=== Ruthenian principalities ===
In the 13th–14th centuries, parts of the core Rus' land and many of southwestern Rus' principalities were united under the power of the Kingdom of Rus' or Ruthenia (Latin: Regnum Rusiae), historiographically better known as the Kingdom of Galicia–Volhynia. Roman the Great was variously named dux Rutenorum, princeps Ruthenorum or rex Ruthenorum by Polish chroniclers. Danylo of Galicia was crowned Rex Ruthenorum or "king of the Rus'" in 1253. Alternatively, Danylo and his brother Vasylko Romanovych were styled Princeps Galiciae, Rex Russiae, and Rex Lodomeriae in Papal documents, while the population of Halych and Volhynia was called Rusciae christiani and populus Russiae amongst other names. The Gesta Hungarorum (c. 1280) stated that the Carpathian mountains between Hungary and Halych were situated in finibus Ruthenie ("on the borders of Ruthenia").

Galicia–Volhynia declined by mid-14th century due to the Galicia–Volhynia Wars after the poisoning of king Yuri II Boleslav by local Ruthenian nobles in 1340. Iohannes Victiensis Liber (page 218) records the death of Boleslav as Hoc anno rex Ruthenorum moritur (...) ("In that year the king of the Ruthenians died (...)"). Grand Duke of Lithuania Gediminas adopted the title King of the Lithuanians and many Ruthenians, ect. or King of Lithuanians and Ruthenians, Prince and Duke of Semigalia in the 1320s. The Grand Duchy of Lithuania, Rus', Samogitia incorporated the majority of Ruthenian territory, and the Kingdom of Poland later absorbed Galicia as the Rus Voivodeship. The latter became the Ruthenian Voivodeship (Latin: Palatinatus Russiae) in 1434.

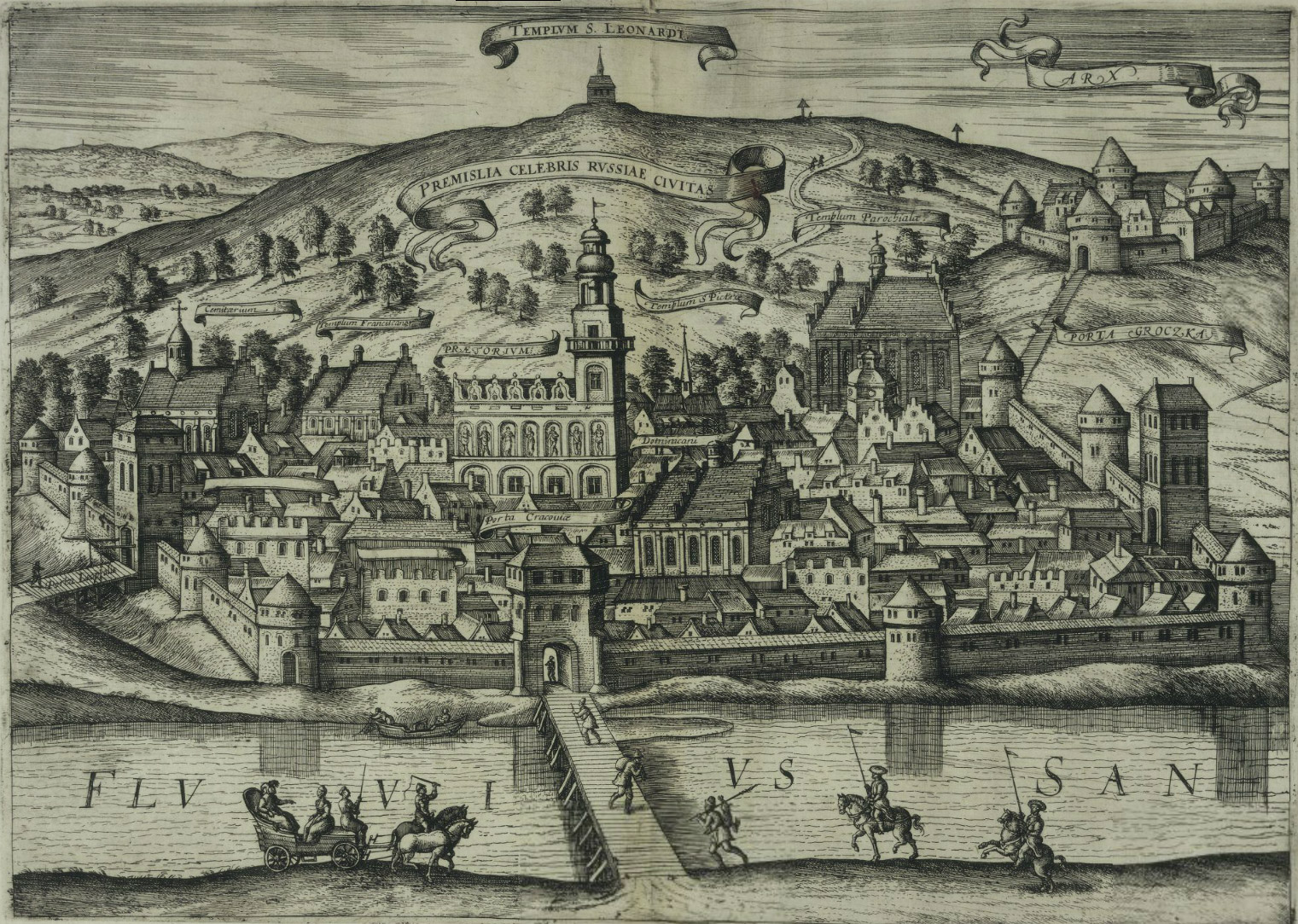
Engraving of 1617 with the inscription "Premislia celebris Rvssiae civitas" (Peremyshl – the famous city of Rus)

While gradually most of the territories of the Grand Duchy of Lithuania, Rus', Samogitia retained the name Rus', some of them got more color-specific names:

- "White Rus" (Russia (Ruthenia) Alba, Belarus, Ruś Biała). This would eventually become the name of the country Belarus.
- "Black Rus" (Russia (Ruthenia) Nigra, Chorna Rus, Ruś Czarna)
- "Red Rus" (Russia (Ruthenia) Rubra, Chervona Rus, Ruś Czerwona)

Although the name Ruthenia arose as a Latinized form of the name Rus' in Western European documents in medieval times, Russia was still the predominant name for Western Rus' territories up until 19th century.

=== Later usage ===
Later usage of the name "Ruthenia" became narrowed to Carpathian Ruthenia (Karpats'ka Rus'), the northeastern part of the Carpathian Mountains, in the Kingdom of Hungary where the local Slavs had Rusyn identity. Carpathian Ruthenia incorporated the cities of Mukachevo (Hungarian: Munkács), Uzhhorod (Hungarian: Ungvár) and Prešov (Pryashiv; Hungarian: Eperjes). Carpathian Rus' had been part of the Kingdom of Hungary since 907, and had been known as "Magna Rus'" but was also called "Karpato-Rus'" or "Zakarpattya".

== Ecclesiastical titles ==
Originally, the metropolitan based in Kiev (Kyiv) called himself "metropolitan of Kiev and all Rus'", but in 1299, the Kievan metropolitan chair was moved to Vladimir by Metropolitan Maximos, Metropolitan of Kiev and All Rus'. One line of metropolitans settled in Moscow in 1325 and continued titling themselves "of Kiev and all Rus'". Patriarch Callistus I of Constantinople in 1361 created two metropolitan sees with their own names (in Greek) for the northern and southern parts: respectively, Μεγάλη Ῥωσσία (Megálē Rhōssía, Great Russia) in Vladimir and Kiev and Μικρὰ Ῥωσσία (Mikrà Rhōssía, Russia Minor or Little Russia) with the centers in Halych and Novogrudok.

After the 15th–16th century Moscow–Constantinople schism, the Muscovite church became autocephalous in 1589, renamed itself the Moscow Patriarchate (today better known as the Russian Orthodox Church) and switched to the title of "Patriarch of Moscow and all Rus'". On the other hand, the southwestern territories of former Kievan Rus' would undergo Polonisation and experience the 1596 Union of Brest, leading to the creation of the Ruthenian Uniate Church (Belarusian: Руская Уніяцкая Царква; Ukrainian: Руська Унійна Церква; Latin: Ecclesia Ruthena unita; Polish: Ruski Kościół Unicki). The primate of this church was titled "Metropolitan of Kiev, Galicia and all Ruthenia". The Annexation of the Metropolitanate of Kiev by the Moscow Patriarchate happened in c. 1685–1722.

When the Ukrainian Autocephalous Orthodox Church proclaimed itself in 1917, its primates styled themselves "Metropolitan of Kiev and All Ukraine", thus replacing "Rus'" with "Ukraine", until 1936. From 1991 to 2000, two further patriarchs of the UAOC called themselves "Patriarch of Kiev and all Rus-Ukraine", but then "Rus" was definitively dropped from the name. After the Unification Council of 2018 which established the Orthodox Church of Ukraine (OCU), the title of Metropolitan of Kiev and All Ukraine was first held by Epiphanius of Kyiv. His rival Filaret (Denysenko) of the Ukrainian Orthodox Church – Kyiv Patriarchate (UOC-KP) continues claiming the title "Patriarch of Kiev and All Rus'-Ukraine". Onufriy (Berezovsky) of the Ukrainian Orthodox Church (Moscow Patriarchate) (UOC-MP) also claims the title of "Metropolitan of Kiev and All Ukraine", and in 2022 the UOC formally cut ties with the Russian Orthodox Church.

== See also ==
- Name of Ukraine
- House of Reuss – a German noble family whose name come from Reußen
- Gathering of the Russian lands – for the succession of Rus'
