= Pierre Mesnard =

French philosopher (1900–1969)

- Born: November 3, 1900; Surgères
- Died: March 12, 1969 (aged 68); Tours
- Occupation: Philosopher

Education
- Education: École normale supérieure

Pierre Mesnard (November 3, 1900 – March 12, 1969) was a French academic, historian of philosophy, and philosopher (characterologist).

== Life ==
Pierre Mesnard studied at the lycée in Poitiers. After voluntarily enlisting in 1918, he became a student in 1920 at the École Normale Supérieure, where he studied under the guidance of Lalande, Brunschvicg, Bréhier, and Bouglé. He obtained his philosophy degree in 1922, the agrégation in 1924, and his doctorate in 1936. He made several study trips and missions to Eastern and Central European countries.

He was a lecturer at the University of Iaşi in Romania, a teacher at the lycées of Rochefort, Poitiers, and Bône from 1930 to 1937, then a professor at the Faculty of Letters in Algiers, which he left for the army, serving as a reserve officer for the four years of the war, before returning to teach in Algiers in 1946.

In 1956, he founded the Center for Advanced Renaissance Studies in Tours. As a professor at the University of Poitiers, he participated in the creation of the Institute of Political Science, where he also taught. He was the director of the journal La Caractérologie at the Presses Universitaires de France. His notable work and contributions earned him election to the Académie des sciences morales et politiques in November 1964.

== Works ==
=== Philosophy ===
- L'essor de la philosophie politique au XVIe siècle, Paris, Boivin, 1936.
- Essai sur la morale de Descartes, Paris, Boivin, 1936.
- Le cas Diderot. Étude de caractériologie littéraire, Paris, P.U.F., 1952.
- Kierkegaard, Paris, P.U.F., 1970.

=== Translations and editions ===
- Jean Bodin, La Méthode de l'Histoire, Paris, Les Belles Lettres, 1941 (traduction et introduction).
- Jean Bodin, Œuvres philosophiques, Paris, P.U.F., 1951 (traduction et édition). Contient le texte latin et la traduction de Discours au Sénat et au peuple de Toulouse; Juris universi distributio; Methodus ad facilem historiarum cognitionem.
- René Descartes, Les passions de l'âme, Paris, Hatier-Boivin, 1955 (révision, introduction et annotation).
- Érasme, La philosophie chrétienne, Paris, J. Vrin, 1970 (traduction, introduction et annotation).
