= Toussaint le Juge =

Toussaint le Juge (died 1632) was a French man who was executed for witchcraft.

In 1631, Anthoine Crestien reported his mother Mazette le Bas, his stepfather Didier Aubertin, and Toussaint le Juge and Barbe Dodin, for witchcraft after having summoned spirits in the house of Mazette le Bas. The trial became one of the biggest witch trials in Paris, involving 25 people and lasting for four years.

Toussaint le Juge was the only one of the accused in the case to be sentenced to death. Initially sentenced to become a galley slave, his final verdict was a death sentence. He was strangled and burnt at the stake in Paris on 25 June, 1632.

Witch trials were uncommon in the city of Paris. The Parlement of Paris were to confirm the death sentences of appeals in witchcraft cases in Northern France, and had done so for the last time in the case of Catherine Bouillon of Orleans in 1625. However, Parisians put on trial for witchcraft were normally not given death sentences, and the execution of Toussaint le Juge was to be the last one until the 1670s.

== See also ==
- Des Eschelles Manseau
