= William Barclay (jurist) =

Scottish jurist

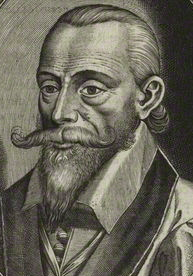
William Barclay.

William Barclay (1546–1608) was a Scottish jurist.

== Life ==
Barclay was born in Aberdeenshire in 1546. Educated at the University of Aberdeen, he went to France by 1572, and studied law at the University of Bourges, where he took his doctor's degree. Charles III, Duke of Lorraine, appointed him professor of civil law in the newly founded university of Pont-à-Mousson, and also made him Counsellor of State and master of requests. Here, he was colleague to the French jurist Pierre Grégoire, with whom he entered into a dispute with the Jesuit faction in the university. In 1603 he was obliged to leave France, having incurred the enmity of the Jesuits, through his opposition to their proposal to admit his son John a member of their society.

Arriving in England, Barclay was offered considerable preferment by James VI on condition of becoming a member of the Church of England. This offer he refused, and he returned to France in 1604, when he was appointed professor of civil law in the university of Angers. He died at Angers in 1608.

== Works ==
William Barclay’s principal work was De Regno et Regali Potestate (1600), a strenuous defence of the rights of kings, in which he refutes the doctrines of those he terms monarchomachs: George Buchanan, "Junius Brutus" (Hubert Languet or Philippe de Mornay) and Jean Boucher, a leading member of the French Catholic League; he also wrote De potestate papae: an & quatenus in reges & principes seculares jus & imperium habeat (published in 1609, after his death), in opposition to the usurpation of temporal powers by the pope, which called forth the celebrated reply of Cardinal Bellarmine; also commentaries on some of the titles of the Pandects.
