= William Loe =

Dr. William Loe (5 November 1575, Kent – September 1645), sometimes written as William Leo or Lowe, was a preacher in the Stuart court. Although lesser known today than other notable preachers, such as John Donne and Lancelot Andrewes, at least a dozen of his sermons were printed and read by the public.

== Life ==
William Loe was likely born in Kent in 1575. In 1600, he was appointed as pastor of Churcham. In 1618, became pastor at Hamburg, Germany, serving the community of English traders. Sometime before 1619, he left this position and was appointed Chaplain to the King. After his controversial anti-Catholic sermon, The King's Sword, he was also assigned as a preacher at Putney. While Dean of Gloucester Cathedral, Loe ordered the removal of the communion table, showing his opposition to Laudian reforms.

Loe was noted for his wit and rhetorical finesse. His memory survives in a widely reported anecdote:

"It is of Loe that the story is told that, having to preach in a church near London at a morning service, where a Mr. Adam was to preach in the same church in the afternoon, he selected for his text the words, 'Adam, where art thou?' to which his colleague, or possibly candidate for the same post, responded later in the day by a discourse from the words 'Lo, here am I."

== Bibliography ==
=== Sermons ===
- The Joy of Jerusalem and Woe of the Worldlings (1609)
- Come and see (1614)
- The Merchant Reall (1620)
- Vox Clamantis (1621)
- The Kings Sword (Published 1623, delivered January 1622.)
- The Kings Shoe (1623)
- The Merchants Manuell (1628)
- The Incomparable Jewell (1632)

=== Others ===
- The Mysterie of Mankind, Made into a Manual (1619)
- Songs of Sion (1620) - republished in 1870, digitisation available
