= Pierre Grégoire (jurist) =

French jurist and philosopher (c.1540–1597)

Pierre Grégoire (also Pedro Gregoire, Petrus Gregorius Tholosanus) (c.1540–1597) was a French jurist and philosopher.

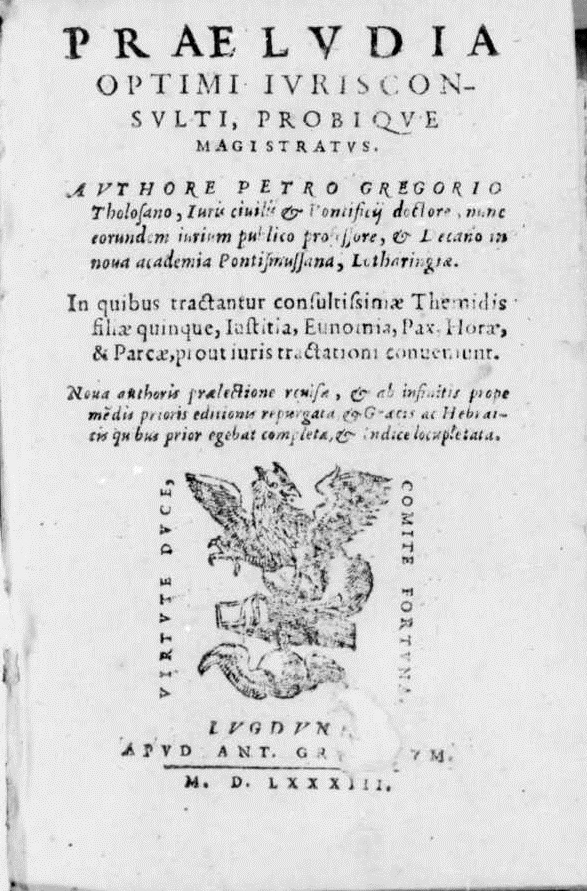
Praeludia, 1583

== Career and key ideas ==
Grégoire was born to a poor Catholic family in Toulouse. He studied the law and made a career for himself as an influential and at times controversial Catholic jurist. He taught law at Cahors and Toulouse from 1566 until 1582 when his patron, Charles III of Lorraine, procured a professorship in civil and canon law for him at the university of Pont à Mousson. Here Grégoire found himself colleague to the Scottish jurist William Barclay, best known for his invention of the term ‘monarchomach’ and his political treatise De Regno et Regali Potestate (1600). Barclay and Grégoire jointly entered into a dispute with the Jesuit masters of the university, and Grégoire famously threatened to abandon Pont à Mousson altogether in protest at their governance. He was reintegrated into the law faculty in 1587 and remained there until his death. Grégoire's patron, Lorraine, had close ties to the Guise family and supported the cause of the Catholic League, to which Grégoire (as a consequence) had some affiliation. However, he later distanced himself from the movement.

Grégoire's De Republica (1596–1597; 1609; 1642) is a detailed analysis of the function and purposes of a Christian commonwealth within a complex legal framework, and is often compared to Jean Bodin's République (1576). Grégoire considers the political community to be natural, and governed by a single person in its best form, stating his preference for monarchy as the ‘best’ of the constitutions described by Aristotle in his Politics. Using the organic metaphor of the body politic, he argued that a single head governed the ‘body’ of the people, thereby tapping into a common theme in theories of monarchy in this period that rule by many heads would be ‘monstrous.’ Grégoire takes an anti-Machiavellian line in the work, arguing specifically against his idea that religion could be used as a prop to political power. Echoing Aquinas’ concept that ‘grace perfects nature’, Grégoire claimed that living under a monarchy was the most natural form of political life, and it enabled subjects to attain eternal life more easily than under other constitutions.

Grégoire's theory of monarchy balances the idea that power originated with the people with the notion that, once transferred, it resides absolutely in the monarch. In tackling this dialectic, Grégoire produced a complex political philosophy whereby the monarch is prevented from corrupting the just, virtuous and pious nature of his office and destroying social and civil life by acting contrary to the fundamentals of human association. Grégoire's De Republica was a deeply influential work of political philosophy, and was Johannes Althusius’ most cited source in his Politica (1603).

== Works ==
His Syntaxes artis mirabilis (1578) was an encyclopedic work on the sciences where magic and demonology were included with astrology and mathematics. Grégoire is considered to be in the tradition of Raymond Lull. The work was placed on the Index of Forbidden Books.

In his De Republica he expresses political views in favour of monarchy, and uses the analogy of family and state. His faculty was dominated by Jesuits, and Grégoire turned away from the policies of the Catholic League. A critic of Machiavelli and not a conventional Gallican, he drew on both Jean Bodin and François Hotman, for an eclectic moderate Catholic position supporting the papal deposing power restricted to the Holy Roman Emperor, and the publication in France of the Tridentine decrees.

- Réponse au conseil donné par Charles du Moulin sur la dissuasion de la juridiction du concile de Trente en France, Lyon, 1584.
- Syntaxes artis mirabilis, in libros septem digestae. Per quas de omni re proposita,... disputari aut tractari, omniumque summaria cognitio haberi potest, Lyon, Antoine Gryphe, 1575–1576, in three parts, the first two in a single volume : I) Syntaxes artis mirabilis 8 ff. + 190 p. II) Commentaria in prolegomena syntaxeon mirabilis artis 1 f, 304 p., III) Syntaxeon artis mirabilis, 8 ff., 1055, 125 p. Later edition: Commentaria in syntaxes artis mirabilis per quas de omnibus disputatur habeturque cognitio autore Petro Gregorio Tholosano impressum Lugduni per Antonium Grifium 1585. Later edition at Cologne, Lazarus Zetner 1610. Google Books
- Syntagma juris universi (1582). t. I t. II
- Praeludia (in Latin). Lyon: Antoine Gryphius. 1583.
- De republica libri sex et viginti, Lyon et Pont-à-Mousson, 1596. New edition 1597. Lyon 1609.
- Institutiones breves et novae rei beneficiariae ecclesisticae (1602)
- Opera Omnia. Geneva 1622
