= Nicolas Vignier =

French lawyer, historiographer and theologian

Nicolas Vignier (1530–1596) was a French lawyer, historiographer and theologian.

== Life ==
He was born in Bar-sur-Seine, in the modern-day department of Aube, in 1530. He died in 1596.

He initially trained to be a doctor; but after conversion to Catholicism, became personal historiographer to Henry III of France.

After his death, his works were printed by his son, Nicolas Vignier Jr.

== Works ==
- Traicté de l'ancien estat de la petite Bretagne, et du droict de la couronne de France sur icelle. Contre les faussetez et calomnies des deux histoires de Bretagne, composées par le feu Sr. Bertrand d'Argentré, président au siège de Rennes. À Paris, chez Adrian Périer, 1619.
- Summary of the history of Francis according to the order of time in four books, the historial extraicts Library Nicolas Vignier ... with traicté origin, estat and remains of François, Paris, S. Nivelle, 1579.
- Of nobility, age, remarks and honor the merits of the third house of France, Paris, 1587.
- The splendor of the ancient Hebrews, Greeks and Romans. With a treatise on the year and month. In Paris, in A. The Angelier, 1588;

== See also ==
fr:Nicolas Vignier fils, the article in French Wikipedia about his son
