= On the Demonomania of the Sorcerers =

1580 book on demonology and witchcraft by Jean Bodin

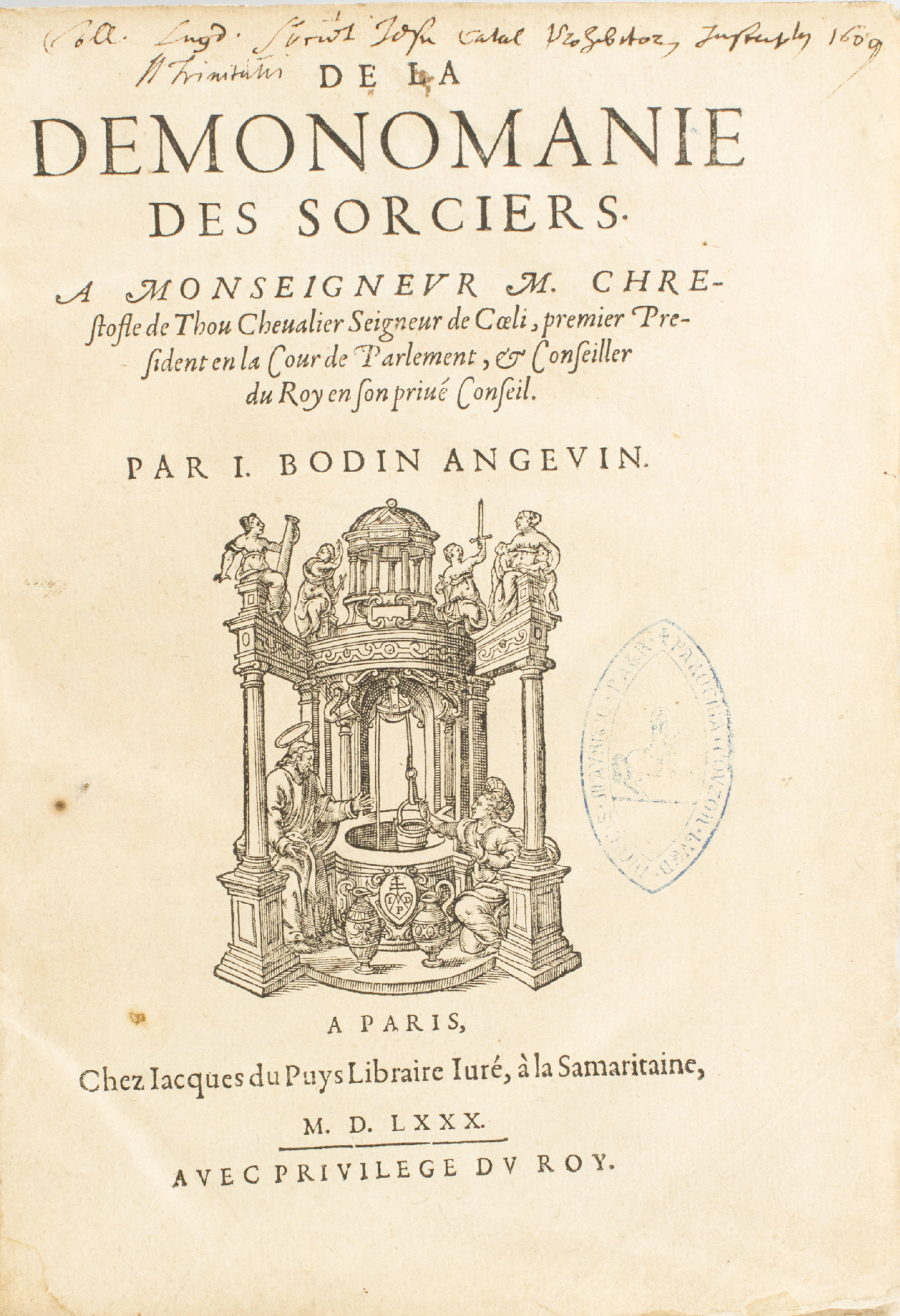
- Title page of the first edition, 1580.
- Author: Jean Bodin
- Original title: De la démonomania des sorciers
- Language: French
- Publication date: 1580
- Publication place: France

On the Demonomania of the Sorcerers (French: De la démonomanie des sorciers) is a treatise on witchcraft and demonology by French jurist and political philosopher Jean Bodin. First published in 1580, the book became an influential and authoritative source on witch-hunting and prosecution, and it probably had greater reach than any other work on witches in that era.

== Editions ==
On the Demonomania of the Sorcerers was first published in French in 1580. By 1604, it had ten editions. It was translated into German by Johann Fischart (1581) under the title De Daemonomania magorum, and in the same year into Latin by François Du Jon as De magorum dæmonomania libri IV.

== Content ==
On the Demonomania of the Sorcerers is divided in four books. In the first, Bodin begins by defining "witch" and "witchcraft." It constitutes one of the earliest legal definitions of witch: "one who, through diabolical means, knowingly seeks to achieve something".

He also describes spirits, classifying them as either benevolent or malevolent. Additionally, he enumerates the various powers that can be obtained by appealing to demons, particularly divinatory and prophetic abilities.

The second book is dedicated to magic. It defines magic and its various forms—such as white and black magic—and explores practices like demon invocation and making pacts with demons. It also addresses lycanthrophy, the supposed ability to transform into a werewolf.

The third book focuses on the ways to prevent or remedy the malevolent actions of witches. It also addresses exorcisms, aimed at expelling spirits that have taken hold of a person.

The fourth book focuses on the legal treatment of witches. Bodin takes a particularly harsh stance, advocating not only for the use of torture but also for painful forms of execution.
