= Johann Boemus =

German humanist (c. 1485 – 1535)

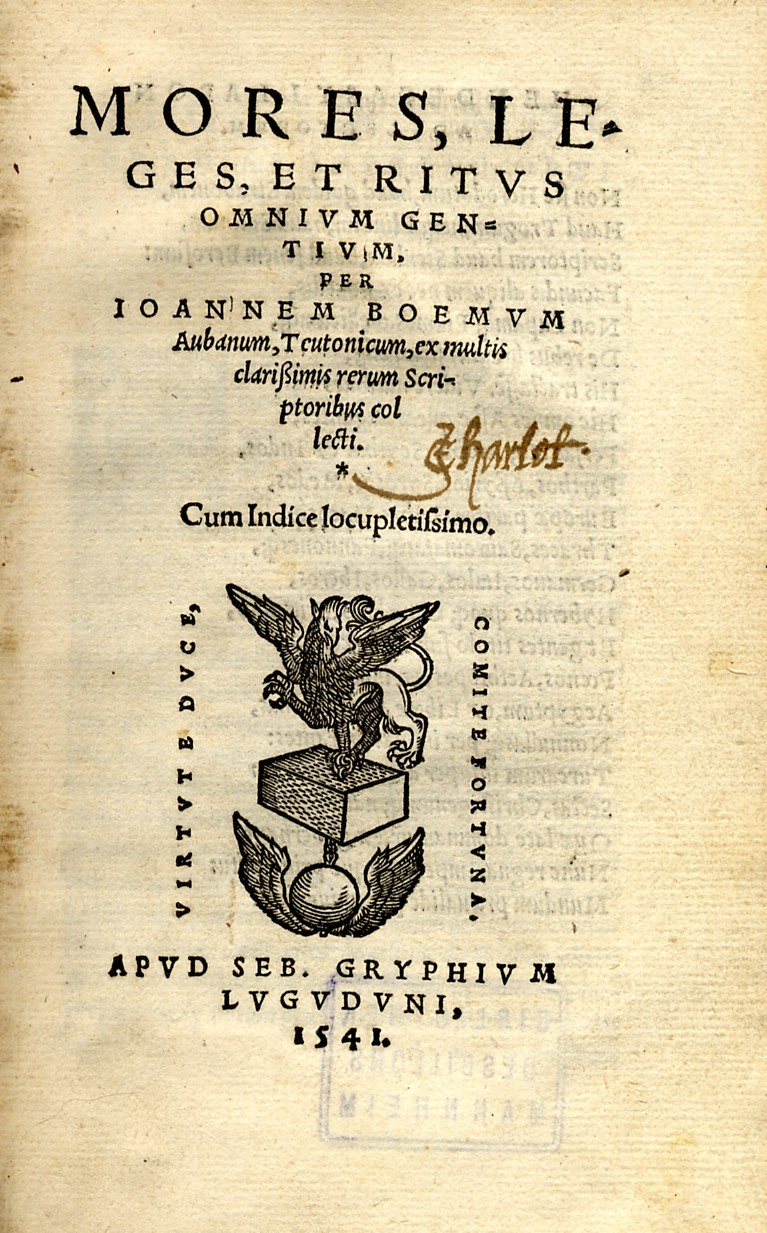
Title page of Johannes Boemus: Mores, Leges Et Ritus Omnium Gentium. - Lyon, 1541.

Johann Boemus (also Bohm or Bohemus; c. 1485 – 1535) was a German humanist, canon of Ulm Minster, traveller, and Hebraist. He was compiler and author of the first ethnographic compendium of the early modern period in Europe.

His Omnium Gentium Mores, Leges et Ritus was published in 1520. It was reprinted multiple times in the sixteenth century, including a 1571 edition. There were later editions, accumulating related treatises by other scholars. It influenced Sebastian Muenster's Cosmography, and helped inspire the Hauptchronik of Sebastian Franck. It helped set the stage for subsequent investigations of the connections of law to culture, including Paul Henri Mallett's Northern Antiquities (1770).

There were English translations by William Waterman (1555) (The Fardle of Facions) and Edward Aston, The Manners, Lawes and Customs of all Nations (London: G. Eld, 1611). This book is cited as the first scientific approach to ethnography available in English.
