= The Six Books of the Republic =

Political philosophy book written by Jean Bodin

- Original title: Les Six Livres de la République
- Genre: Political philosophy
- Publication date: 1576

The Six Books of the Republic or Six Books of the Commonwealth (original title in French: Les Six Livres de la République) is a work of political philosophy written by Jean Bodin, a French historian, jurist, and philosopher, and published in 1576. It is considered one of the classics of political philosophy.

== Publication history ==
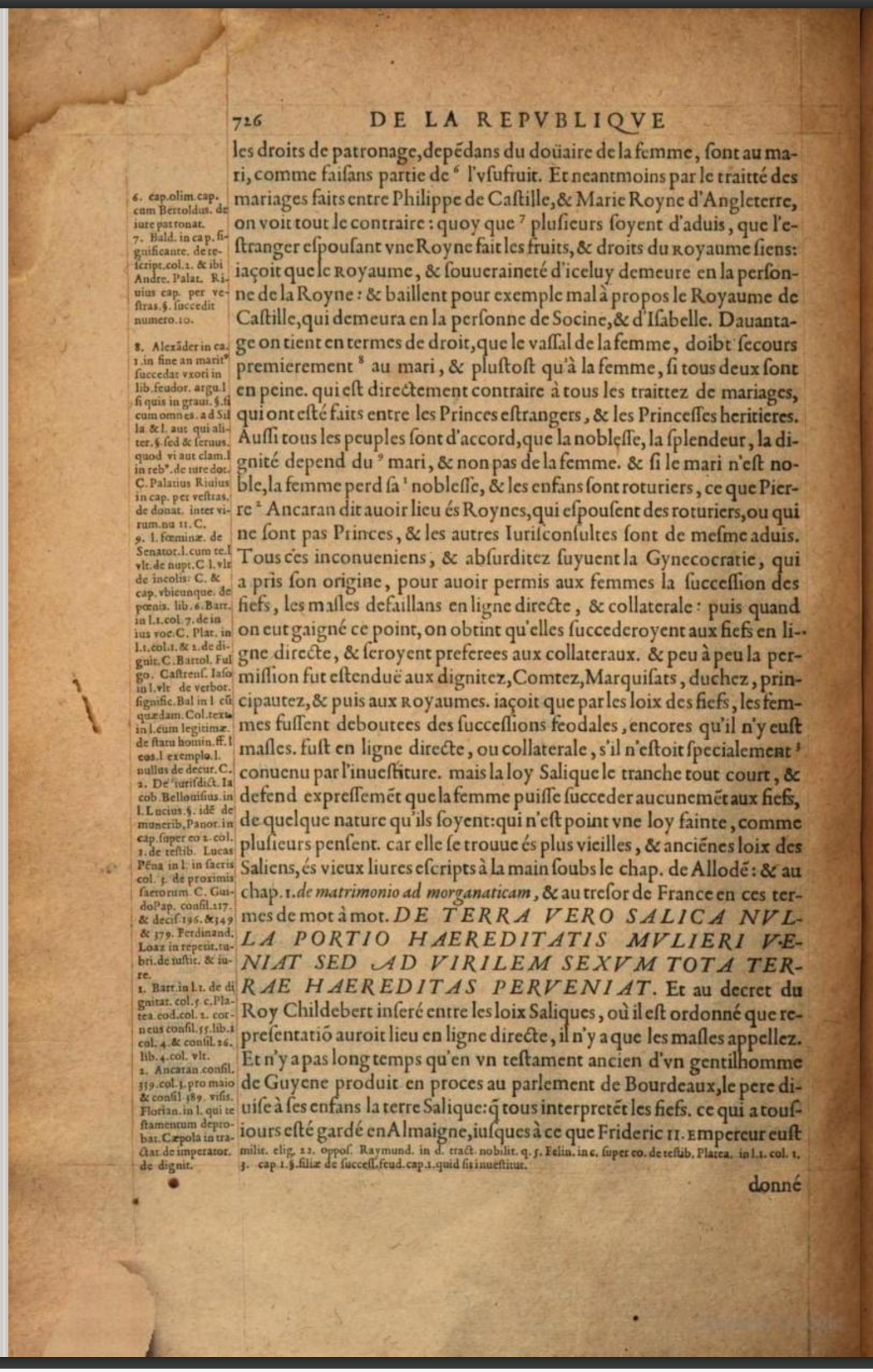
An inside page from the original edition of the treatise (1576)

The Six Books of the Republic is considered the masterwork of Jean Bodin, who was recognized at the time of its publication as one of the leading European intellectuals. He wrote the Books in French, rather than in Latin—the scholarly language of the time—so that they could be shared and read by as many people as possible.

By the late 1570s, this work was being studied at the University of Cambridge and the University of London. For academic audiences, Bodin himself translated the book into Latin, which was published in 1586. Between 1576 and 1629, the work saw at least fourteen French editions and nine Latin editions. It was also translated into Italian (1588), Spanish (1590), German (1592 and 1611), and English (1606).

== Objective ==
The Six Books opens with a letter to “Monseigneur Du Faur, Lord of Pibrac, Counselor to the King in his Privy Council,” in which the author justifies his endeavor by expressing a desire to “save this Kingdom.” At the time, France was deeply divided by religious conflict between Catholics and Huguenots, which had led to the Wars of Religion and culminated in the St. Bartholomew’s Day Massacre in 1572.

Rejecting the scholastic method—still widely taught in universities—as well as the utopianism embodied by Thomas More, Bodin reshaped political thought using the historical method, particularly the constitutional history of the major European states. This monumental work, foundational to modern political theory, continues to serve as a reference for jurists and philosophers today.

Bodin develops the key concept of the modern state, whose existence is defined by sovereignty, and whose main attribute is the "power to make and break the law." He also introduces a new classification of political regimes: democracy, monarchy, and aristocracy.

== Synopsis ==
- Book I: The primary goal of a well-ordered Republic. Comparison with the household. On marital authority; paternal authority; lordly authority and whether slavery should be tolerated in a Republic. Definition of the citizen. On treaties between Princes. On sovereignty.
- Book II: Types of Republics: seigniorial monarchy, royal monarchy, tyrannical monarchy; aristocratic state; popular (democratic) state.
- Book III: Senate, magistracies, and administration.
- Book IV: Growth and decline of Republics; the Prince’s relationship with his subjects; how to deal with seditions.
- Book V: Variations in Republics based on differences in topography, climate, and populations. Laws on polygamy. Assignment of official positions. Disposition of the property of the condemned.
- Book VI: Finances and the integrity of currency. Comparison of the three forms of Republics. Distributive justice.

The original French edition of 1576 includes an index of 70 pages.

== Theses ==
=== Sovereignty ===
Jean Bodin places the notion of sovereignty, which characterizes the State, at the center of his reflection. Bodin does not base the State on a social contract—although this concept was known in his time and developed by Protestants—nor on the state of nature. Sovereignty is defined as indivisible (non-shareable), perpetual, and absolute. It has no other condition than the law of God and the law of nature. Sovereignty has several attributes:

- Power to make the law: The primary mark of sovereignty is to “make the law,” without being subject to the command or guardianship of anyone. As a corollary, the idea of equality is added: a small king is just as sovereign as the greatest monarch on earth.
- Respect for the laws of nature: Sovereignty does not imply arbitrary power: thus, the absolute power of sovereign princes and lords does not extend in any way to the laws of God and nature. From this it follows that in the international order, sovereignty is also subject to law: “the sovereign prince is bound by contracts he makes either with his subjects or with foreigners.” The prince is bound by just and reasonable treaties and agreements. In this way, Bodin presents, on the international level, sovereigns who are independent and equal, yet subject to law in their mutual relations.
- Notion of the national state: Depending on whether the people under the same sovereign power are subject to the same laws and customs or not, the state is either unitary or federative; of course, it occupies a territory, but this point does not attract Bodin’s attention. What matters to him is the union of a people under a sovereign lord, the will to live together.

=== Definition of good government ===
Bodin rejects Machiavellianism and seeks to restore the idea that the king’s observance of Justice is a necessary condition for the Republic to function. He thus defines the Republic as the rightful government of several households and what they have in common, with sovereign power. The public decision-maker can only make decisions aimed at the common good, and can only decide on matters that are common, never on private interests.

Therefore, rightful government must conform to the law of the God of Christianity, aiming for justice and order. The Republic must always be well-ordered and strive to achieve higher values, both morally and intellectually.

The Republic is therefore also an art of governing: If the Prince must, in his dealings with his subjects, imitate the wisdom of God in governing the world, he must appear before his subjects only rarely, and with a majesty appropriate to his greatness and power.

=== Relations between nations ===
Bodin places foremost the balance between sovereign powers: the security of Princes and Republics lies in an equal counterbalance of power among them. The respect of treaties is mandatory and does not require the ancient practice of oath-taking. However, it is necessary to ensure that the conditions are not unbearable for any of the parties.

On the commercial level, he is in favor of trade between States and believes that restrictions on trade should be limited to the imperatives of the public interest.

He also considers that there is a true interdependence among the different regions of the world, marked by an unequal distribution of wealth, which implies the necessity of commercial relations, but also of relations of friendship and charity: We must give a part of our goods to foreigners and teach them our arts and techniques, for we owe them this charity by natural obligation.

Entering the field of the law of the sea, Bodin argues that territorial sovereignty extends even to the sea, up to thirty leagues from the land.

== Legacy ==
Widely discussed in France, England, and the Germanic countries, it inspired the work of jurists and theorists of the modern State, notably Grotius, Pufendorf, Hobbes, and Locke. It was found in the libraries of the first Puritan colonists of New England as early as 1620.

Legohérel believes that Bodin played a foundational role in international law, because, much more than Grotius, he established a close connection between the law of nations and the practice of Nations.

=== Criticism ===
Bodin’s work has been subject to some criticism. Jean-Jacques Chevallier notes that Bodin has been accused of having prolonged and placed the final stone on the edifice of royal jurists who justified absolute monarchy. The Six Books allegedly contain a doctrine that philosophically justified royal absolutism. Bodin defended himself during his lifetime, writing in the dedicatory epistle at the beginning of the 1578 edition: "I am astonished that I have been reproached for having attributed to the power of one more than was proper to a courageous citizen." He adds: "I was the first of all, at a time when it was dangerous to do so, to refute the opinions of those who, writing about the extension of fiscal rights and royal prerogatives, attributed to kings an unlimited power, superior to divine and natural laws."
