= Judith Man =

English translator

Judith Man (fl. 1640) was an English translator. Her 1640 Epitome of the History of Faire Argenis and Polyarchus was a translation of Nicolas Coeffeteau's 1623 Histoire de Poliarque et d'Argénis, itself an abridged translation of John Barclay's Latin book Argenis.

== Life ==
Judith Man is likely to have been a relative of Peter Man, solicitor to Thomas Wentworth, 1st Earl of Strafford. She says that she was eighteen years old at Christmas 1639, when she made her translation, and a member of the Strafford household. An English Protestant, she had travelled in France with her parents as a child.

Man dedicated her translation to Wentworth's eldest daughter, Anne. Her preface justified translation as an appropriate activity for a woman, combining diversion and self-improvement. Only two extant copies of the translation survive, at the Huntington Library and the Bodleian Library.

Nothing is known of her later life.

== Works ==
- Epitome of the History of Faire Argenis and Polyarchus, 1640
