= Oath of Allegiance of James I of England =

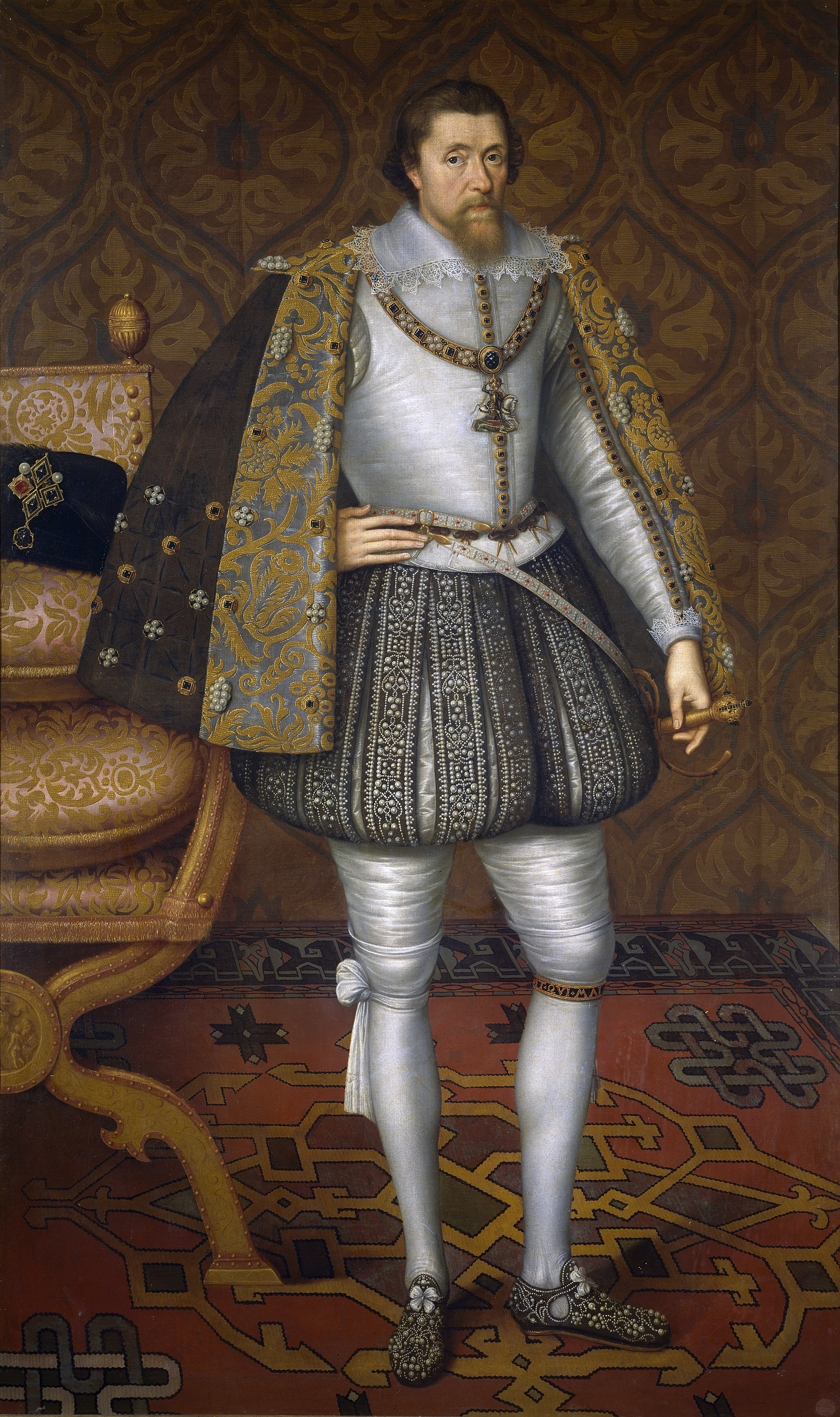
James I

The Oath of Allegiance of 1606 was an oath requiring English Catholics to swear allegiance to James I over the Pope. It was adopted by Parliament the year after the Gunpowder Plot of 1605 (see Popish Recusants Act 1605). The oath was proclaimed law on 22 June 1606, it was also called the Oath of Obedience (Latin: juramentum fidelitatis). Whatever effect it had on the loyalty of his subjects, it caused an international controversy lasting a decade and more.

== Oath ==
The oath was proclaimed law on 22 June 1606. It contained seven affirmations, and was targeted on "activist political ideology". The oath in part read:

I, A.B. do truly and sincerely acknowledge, profess, testify, and declare in my conscience before God and the world, that our Sovereign Lord King James, is lawful and rightful King of this realm, and of all other in his Majesties Dominions and Countries; And that the Pope neither of himself, nor by any authorities of the Church or See of Rome, or by any means with any other hath any power or authority to depose the King, or to dispose any of his Majesty's kingdoms, or dominions, or to authorize any foreign prince to invade or annoy him, or his countries, or to discharge any of his Subjects of their allegiance and obedience to his Majesty, or to authorize any foreign prince to invade him &c., or to give license to any to bear arms, raise tumults, &c. &c. Also I do swear that notwithstanding any sentence of excommunication or deprivation I will bear allegiance and true faith to his Majesty &c. &c. And I do further swear that I do from my heart abhor, detest, and abjure, as impious and heretical this damnable doctrine and position,--that princes which be excommunicated by the pope may be deposed or murdered by their subjects or by any other whatsoever. And I do believe that the pope has no power to absolve me from this oath. I do swear according to the plain and common sense, and understanding of the same words &c. &c. &c"

— Popish Recusants Act 1605 (3 Jas. 1. c. 4)

== Papal response ==
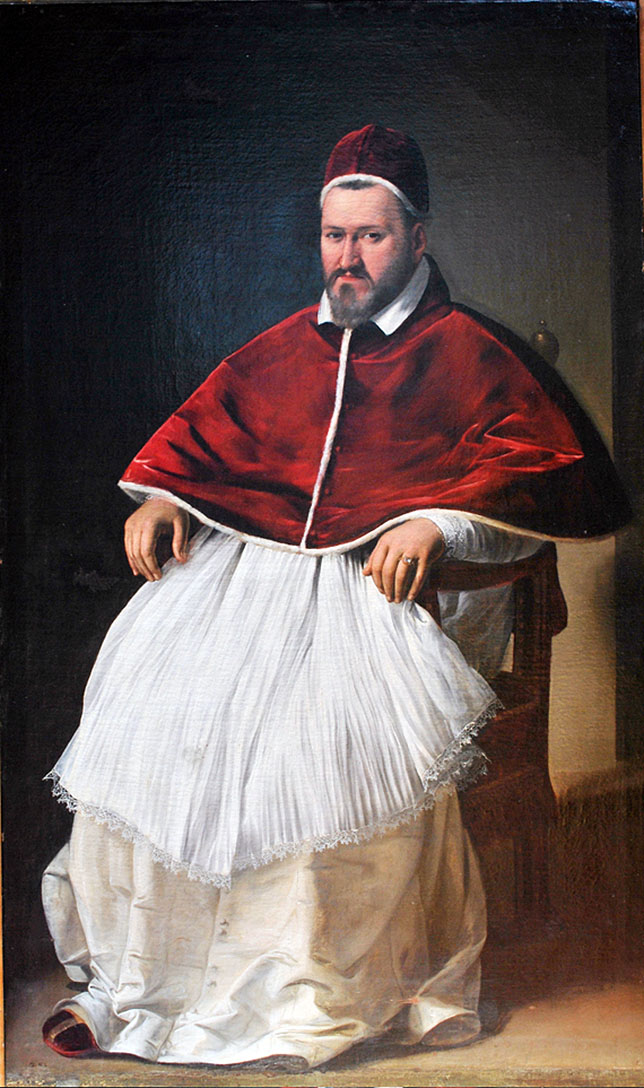
Pope Paul V

Both Pope Paul V and Cardinal Bellarmine wrote letters condemning the oath. On 22 September 1606, Pope Paul V condemned the formula: "It cannot be taken, as it contains many things evidently contrary to faith and salvation.

James then asserted that his oath was not meant to encroach upon anyone's conscientious convictions. Hereupon, minimizers began to maintain that the words of the oath might be interpreted by the intention of the law-giver that the oath might therefore be taken.

== Catholic views ==
The new oath of allegiance was drafted in such a way that it was bound to create divisions within the English Catholic community as to whether it could be taken in good conscience. Following the Gunpowder Plot, archpriest George Blackwell, then head of the English Catholic secular clergy, wrote to Rome and obtained a letter from Pope Paul V condemning the plot and calling on English Catholics not to disturb the peace. Blackwell had at first disapproved of the oath, but citing the Pope's call for civil obedience, advised his priests that the oath could licitly be taken. The Pope, however, condemned the new oath soon afterwards. After the pope's Brief, he disallowed it once more. Blackwell was captured on 24 June 1607 and interrogated over the following ten days about his opinion of the oath. At the end of that period he was tendered the oath, which he took, relying on James's statement that no encroachment on conscience was intended, and recommended others do the same. The pope then issued a new Brief (23 August 1607), repeating his prohibition. Bellarmine wrote a letter (18 September 1607) to Blackwell, an acquaintance from Flanders many years previously, reproaching him for having taken the oath in apparent disregard of his duty to the pope. Blackwell's position satisfied neither the Pope, who condemned it within days of Bellarmine's letter and replaced Blackwell by George Birkhead (February 1608), nor the English government, who imprisoned him.

In 1603, William Bishop, a secular priest, had drawn up a "Protestation of Allegiance" to Queen Elizabeth, signed by twelve other priests besides himself, in which they took up their stand against those who aimed at the conversion of England by political means. He was later examined on 4 May 1611, he said he was opposed to the Jesuits, but declined to take the oath of allegiance, as Blackwell and others had done, because he explicitly rejected the deposing power, but refused the oath as he wished to uphold the credit of the secular priests at Rome, and to get the English College there out of the hands of the Jesuits.

== Controversy ==
There is a range of views among contemporary scholars about King James's intention in requiring the oath. These include:

- (Programmatic) to forward a wider theological and ecumenical project (Patterson);
- (Persecuting) to give grounds for bearing down on English Catholics who faced the dilemma of swearing or not (Questier);
- (Anti-papalist) to target supporters of papal temporal authority (Somerville); or
- (Assertive) to assert his own spiritual authority (Tutino).

It is seen as aimed at resistance theorists as well as traitors; and a move to split "moderates" from "radicals" among English Catholics.

There were unintended consequences. According to W.B. Patterson, "James himself did not give up his vision of a peaceful and united Church at home and abroad which he had unfolded to Parliament at its opening session in 1604. But in defending the Oath of Allegiance, he allowed himself to be drawn into a bitter Europe-wide theological controversy." By the beginning of 1609, it had begun to touch on a whole range of European issues: English Catholics, Rhineland Calvinists, Gallicanism in France, the aftermath of the Venetian Interdict, and the uncertain Catholic orthodoxy of the Vienna court of Emperor Rudolph II. It had repercussions for international diplomacy; and in particular the handling of the Premonition had a negative effect on diplomatic relations between Great Britain and Venice, which had been improving during the Interdict.

=== Bellarmine drawn in ===
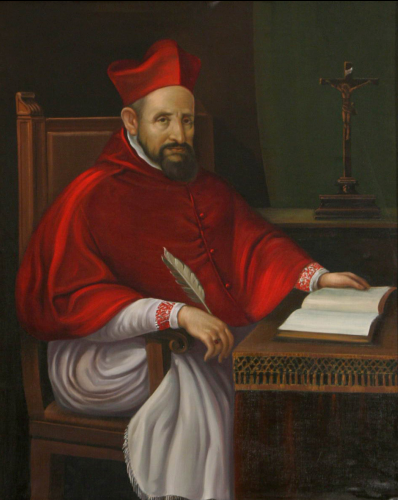
Robert Bellarmine

James attacked Bellarmine early in 1608 in a treatise Triplici nodo, triplex cuneus, the title of which identified it in a learned fashion as an answer to the missives sent to Blackwell. It was published anonymously in English around February 1608, and was then translated into Latin and French. It was the work of James, supported by advice from Lancelot Andrewes, Richard Bancroft and James Montague. The cardinal answered with a Responsio, using the pseudonym Matthaeus Tortus (i.e. Matteo Torti or Torto, his chaplain); he portrayed James as smooth in past correspondence with the papacy, but delivering little in practical terms. This accusation raked up a matter from before James's accession to the English throne.

In 1599 a letter signed by James had been sent to Pope Clement VIII, requesting him to give a cardinal's hat to William Chisholm, a kinsman of James Elphinstone, 1st Lord Balmerino, and expressing high regard for the Pope and the Catholic faith. Originally, it had been dismissed as a forgery. When the matter was brought up again in 1608, severe pressure was put by Dunbar and Robert Cecil, 1st Earl of Salisbury on Balmerino to induce him to take the whole blame on himself, and on the promise that his life and estates should be secured to him he consented to exculpate the king. The account he then gave was that he had written the letter, and had surreptitiously passed it in among papers awaiting the king's signature. Balmerino was disgraced and sentenced to death, but the sentence was never carried out, and he later retired to his estates. According to a second account of Bellarmine, James was well aware of the letter's contents and had signed without hesitation.

Besides the main disputants, a number of secondary writers joined the fray. On the Catholic side were Cardinal Duperron, Leonard Lessius, Jacob Gretser, Thomas Fitzherbert, Martin Becan, Gaspar Scioppi, Adolph Schulckenius, Nicolas Coeffeteau, and Andreas Eudaemon Joannes. Robert Persons wrote his Treatise tending to Mitigation (1608). No one was more closely identified with the Jesuit role in the English mission than Parsons, and he was already a central figure in the polemics around it. William Barlow made mischief by suggesting Parsons in any case was second fiddle to Robert Bellarmine.

Opposed to them were: Lancelot Andrewes, William Barlow, Robert Burhill, Pierre du Moulin, the poet John Donne (in his Pseudo-Martyr of 1610) and the Benedictine Thomas Preston, who wrote in defence of the oath.

=== James' response ===
Andrewes replied to Bellarmine in Tortura Torti (1609). James insisted that Andrewes included in Tortura Torti references to the idea that if a Pope meddled with the temporal allegiances of Catholics, this was with indication of an identification of the Antichrist of the Book of Revelation.

James politicised the whole debate with his Premonition in the same year, dedicated to the Emperor Rudolph II and all the monarchs of Christendom. In it James now dropped his anonymity, and posed as the defender of primitive and true Christianity. In the Premonition James shifted to a more equivocal position. His view was that the identification could not be required as a matter of faith. He spoke of it as conjectural; but as a belief to which he was committed, at least as long as the interference in temporal matters persisted. He balanced these statements with concessions on the Pope's spiritual status. Half of the book dwelled on this topic, expressed in terms offensive to Catholics. James's approach seemed to be a bargaining chip, or feeler for negotiations, to the diplomat Antoine Lefèvre de la Boderie.

=== Gallican reaction ===
After this, Bellarmine published, now also using his own name, his Apologia pro responsione ad librum Jacobi I (1609). James opposed to this a treatise by a learned Scottish Catholic, William Barclay, De potestate papae (1609). Barclay's views were on the Gallican side, and Bellarmine's answer, Tractatus de potestate summi pontificis in rebus temporalibus (1610), gave offence to French Gallicans; it was publicly burnt in Paris by a Decree of 26 November 1610. In reply to a posthumous treatise of Barclay, Bellarmine wrote a Tractatus de potestate summi pontificis in rebus temporalibus. It reiterated his assertions on the subject of papal power, and was prohibited in France. Another prominent rejection of Bellarmine's claim of papal superior authority was made by philosopher Thomas Hobbes in the third and fourth book of his Leviathan.

Francisco Suárez's answer to James was the Defensio fidei (1613), a major statement of the Catholic position, and also an important landmark in political thought. It suffered the same fate as Bellarmine's Tractatus, through an arrêt of 26 June 1614; but this decree was eventually withdrawn at the request of the Pope. It was burned in London, too, in 1613.

== Subsequent history ==
The main years of the controversy were 1608 to 1614, but publications directly connected with it appeared until 1620. Subsequently, it remained a topic of polemics, but Charles I was little interested in continuing his father's patronage of writers who addressed it. By the 1630s authors such as Du Moulin and David Blondel on these topics could expect no reward.

The oath was used against Catholics during the rest of the 17th century, for example in the cases of Robert Drury, Thomas Atkinson, John Almond, John Thulis, Edmund Arrowsmith, Richard Herst, George Gervase, Thomas Garnet, John Gavan, and Henry Heath; the last two left writings against it. George Calvert, 1st Baron Baltimore, a Catholic, found his attempt to settle in Virginia, where the oath had been introduced in 1609, was defeated by it. His son Cecilius Calvert, 2nd Baron Baltimore, on the other hand, ordered his adventurers to take the oath, but whether he insisted on this is uncertain.

Charles I of England generally recognised that Catholics could not conscientiously take the Oath of Supremacy, and frequently exerted his prerogative to help them to avoid it. On the other hand, his theory of the divine right of kings induced him to favour the Oath of Allegiance, and he was irritated with the Catholics who refused it or argued against it. Pope Urban VIII is said to have condemned the oath again in 1626, and the controversy continued. Preston still wrote in its defence; so also, at King Charles's order, did Sir William Howard (1634); this was probably the future William Howard, 1st Viscount Stafford. Their most important opponent was Jesuit Father Edward Courtney, who was therefore imprisoned by Charles. The matter is frequently mentioned in the dispatches and the "Relatione" of Panzani, the papal agent to Queen Henrietta Maria.

The Sorbonne, on 30 June 1681, shortly before approving the Gallican articles, censored the English oath, and found in it very little to object to.

Oath of Obedience and Popish Recusants Act 1605 were repealed by Religious Disabilities Act 1846.

== Sources ==
- Patterson, W. B. (1997). James VI and I and the Reunion of Christendom.
