= Bernard Sutholt =

German jurist

Bernard Sutholt was a German jurist.

== Career ==
Sutholt was born in Hamm, Westphalia. Around 1619, he received a doctorate in law from Heidelberg University where he studied under Bachovius. After that, he went to Leiden University, where he abandoned Calvinism after reading the works of Isaac Casaubon. From Casaubon, he went on to read the Church Fathers, especially Augustine of Hippo's The City of God.

Sutholt eventually became a professor of civil law and practical philosophy at an academy in Harderwijk, after being offered a position at Leiden. There, he undertook further theological study, reading John Barclay, Lessius, Tertullian, Bellarmine, and Bacon.

In 1625, the duke of Jülich appointed Sutholt as his counsellor.

== Works ==
- Oratio inauguralis de ratione interpretandi juris, & philosophiae cum juris studio conjunctione (1622)
- Dissertationes undeviginti, quibus universum jus institutionium ex principiis explicatur (second edition, 1633)
