= Francesco Pona =

Italian doctor, philosopher and writer (1595-1655)

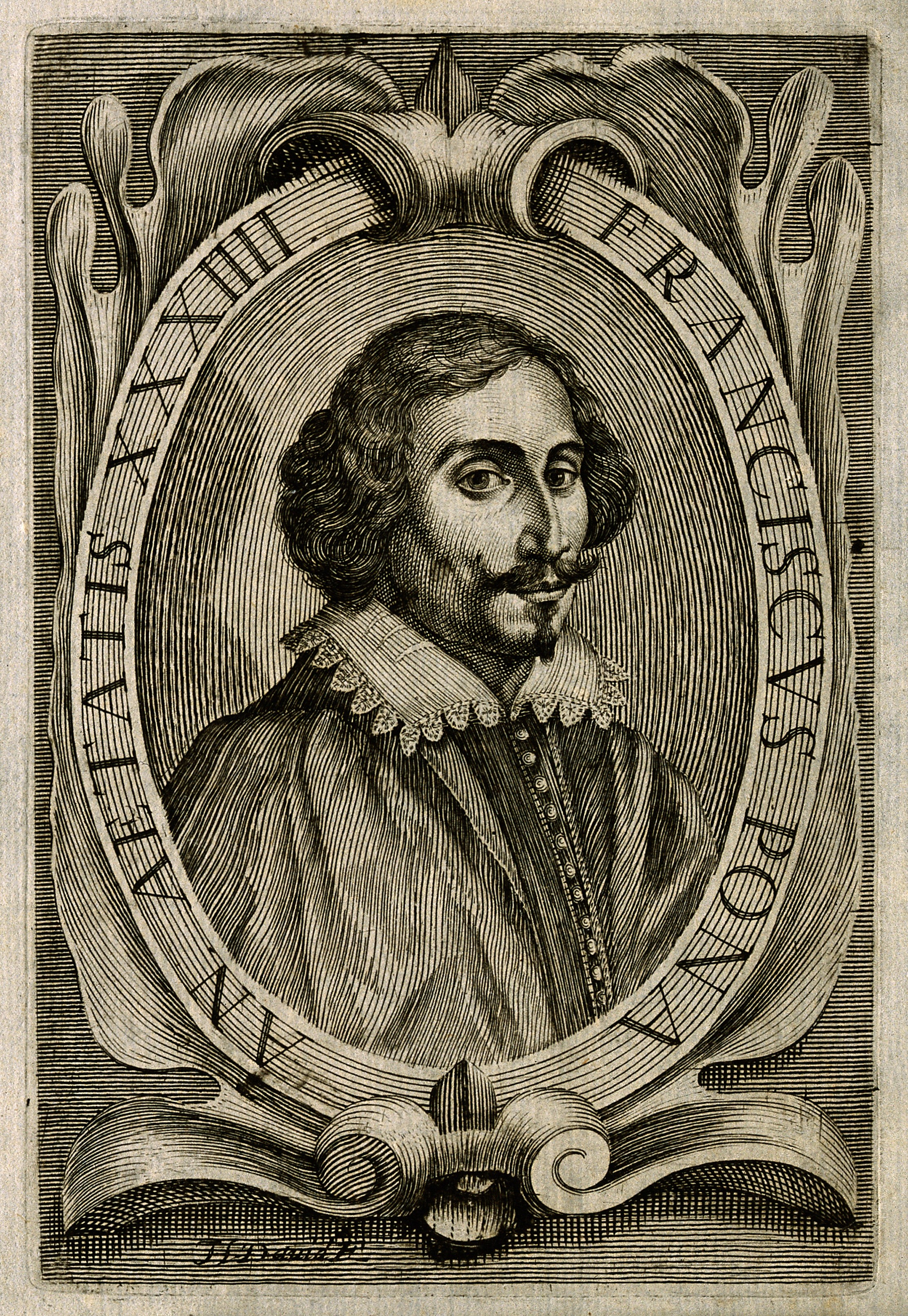
- Francesco Pona. Line engraving by H. David
- Born: 11 October 1595; Verona, Republic of Venice
- Died: 2 October 1655 (aged 59); Verona, Republic of Venice
- Resting place: San Fermo Maggiore, Verona
- Other name: Eureta Misoscolo
- Education: University of Padua; University of Bologna
- Occupations: Historian; Playwright; Physician; Writer
- Spouses: Flora Pona (m. 1617; died 1624) Elisabetta Mendadori (m. 1624)
- Parent(s): Giovanni Pona and Camilla Pona (née Gipsi)
- Writing career
- Language: Italian; Latin
- Period: 17th century; Seicento
- Genres: Poetry; treatise
- Notable works: La Lucerna (1625); L'Ormondo (1635)
- Movements: Baroque; Marinism

Francesco Pona (11 October 1595 – 2 October 1655) was an Italian medical doctor, philosopher, Marinist poet and writer from Verona, whose works ranged from scientific treatises and history to poetry and plays.

== Biography ==
A Veronese medical doctor and member of many academies, Pona was a prolific writer, producing medical and scientific texts, historiography, literary translation, drama, lyric poetry, prose romances, and tales. A follower of Cesare Cremonini, a heterodox Aristotelian professor at Padua, Pona was a leading member of the influential Accademia degli Incogniti - a society of Venetian intellectuals famous for the libertine and anti-clerical tendencies of many of its members. By the late-1620s, Pona converted to a strict Catholicism and abjured his juvenile production.

After his conversion Pona dedicated himself to composing moral works of religious inspiration and biographies of saints. Of particular importance are the morality play in four acts Parthenio (1627), displaying the triumph of virginity (the two main characters – Partenio and Virginità – get married, and eventually the latter guides her spouse to Heaven) and the sacred play in five-acts Il Christo Passo (1629).

In 1650 Pona received the title of historiographer from the emperor Ferdinand III. He died in Verona on 2 October 1655.

== Main works ==
Pona is best known for the horrific and macabre stories of La Lucerna (The Lamp, 1625). This is a dialogue between a young student, Eureta, and a soul imprisoned in his oil lamp. The soul tells the boy the story of its many reincarnations in various people, animals, and objects, emphasizing the pathological and cruel aspects of its experiences. Despite its heterodoxy (in March 1626 La Lucerna was included in the Index Librorum Prohibitorum by the Catholic Church), the work was so popular that it was reprinted in five editions before the end of the decade.

Ormondo (1635), with its five insert-stories, offers an interesting blend of romance and novella traditions. Pona is also known for his translations of Ovid's Metamorphoses (1617), Martianus Capella's De nuptiis Philologiae et Mercurii and John Barclay's Argenis (1629). Later in his life, he wrote an emblem book, Cardiomorphoseos, sive ex corde desumpta emblemata sacra (1645), called by a leading scholar "a point of suture between Renaissance imprese and Baroque emblems".

Pona's scientific works include Il gran contagio di Verona nel 1630 (1631), an accurate account of the plague that affected Verona in 1630. The essay granted him the honour of being part of the Collegio dei Medici, the most prestigious organization of doctors in Verona at that time. Pona was also the author of an accurate description of the Giusti Garden in Verona (Il Sileno, 1620).

== List of Works ==
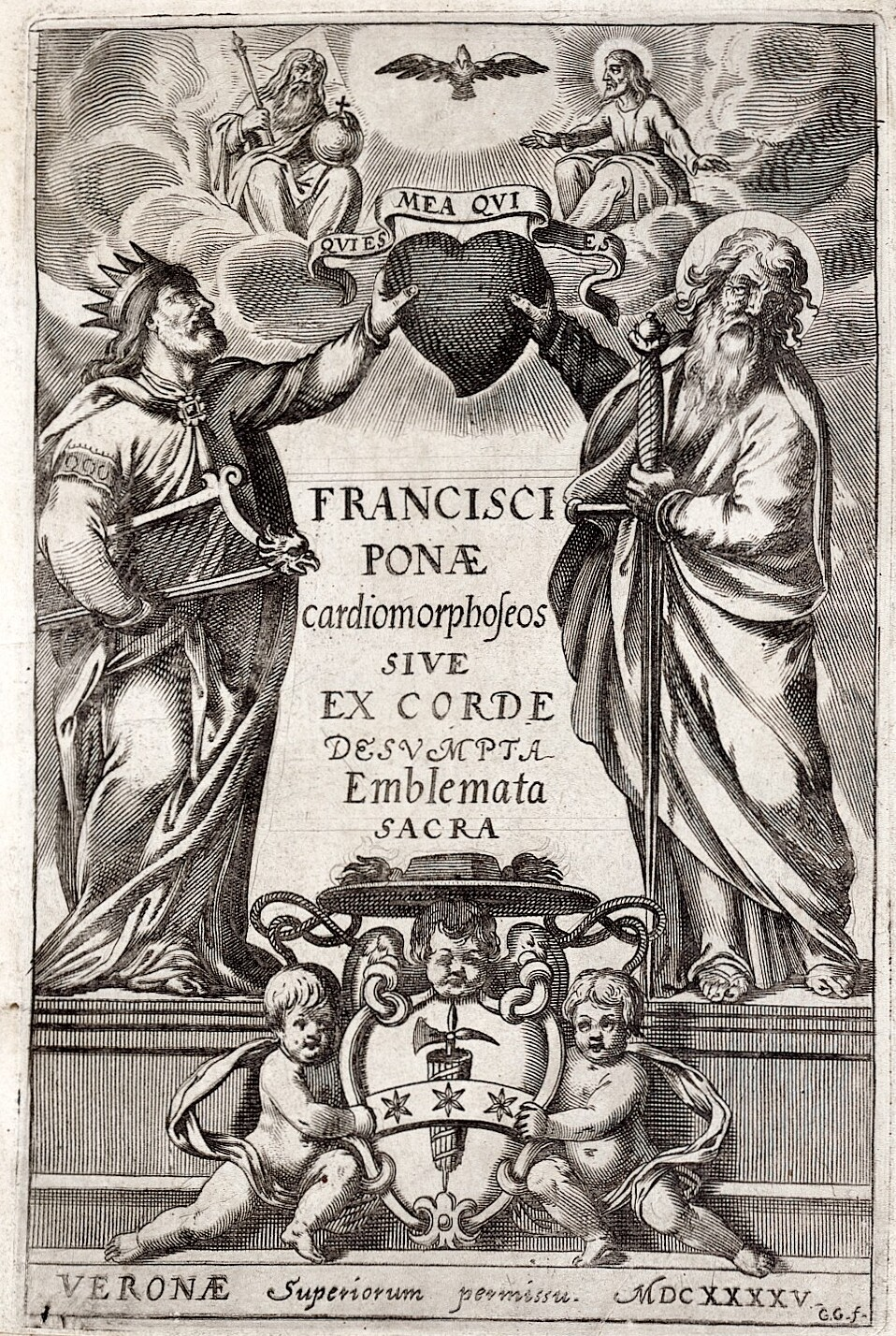
Cardiomorphoseos sive ex corde desumpta emblemata sacra, Verona, 1645

- Sileno overo Delle Bellezze del Luogo dell'Ill.mo Sig. Co. Gio. Giacomo Giusti. Pubblicato, con l'occasione delle Nozze de gl'Ill.mi Sig.ri Il Sig. Conte Francesco Giusti e la Signora Antonia Lazise. Verona: Angelo Tamo. 1620.
- Il Paradiso de' Fiori overo Lo archetipo de' Giardini. Verona: Angelo Tamo. 1622.
- La Lucerna, 1625: a dialogue reporting the imagined discussions over four evenings between a speaker-narrator (a soul imprisoned in an oil lamp) and the student Eureta, allowing the author to tell a series of observations, stories, curious or memorable facts and the lives of modern, mythological or historical people, each of whom the author makes represent a specific behavioural trait or illustrate a particular moral teaching.
- La Maschera iatropolitica, overo cervello e cuore principj rivali. Venezia: Marco Ginammi. 1627.
- Medicinæ anima sive rationalis praxis epitome, selectiora remedia ad usum principum continens. Verona: Emanuel Lerma. 1629.
- Pona, Francesco (1629). Elogia utroque Latii stylo conscripta ad ill. Jac. Goddium patrit. Florentinum. Verona.
- Il gran Contagio di Verona nel Milleseicento, e trenta. Descritto da Francesco Pona Filosofo Medico di Collegio. Verona: per Bartolommeo Merlo. 1631.
- La Messalina. Venice: Giacomo Sarzina. 1633.
- La Cleopatra, tragedia. Venice: presso il Sarzina. 1635.
- La Galeria delle Donne celebri. Rome: Mascardi. 1641.
- Trattato de' veleni e la cura. Verona: Per Bartolomio Merlo. 1643.
- Cardiomorphoseos siue ex corde desumpta emblemata sacra. Verona: Merlo. 1645.
- L'Antilucerna dialogo di Eureta Misoscolo. Verona: per Francesco Rossi. 1648.
- L'Adamo. Verona: Merlo. 1650.
- Academico-medica Saturnalia. Verona: Bartolomeo Merlo. 1652.
- Dell'eccellenza, et Perfettione ammirabile della Donna. Verona: Rossi. 1653.

== Bibliography ==
- Bondi, Fabrizio (2015). "PONA, Francesco". Dizionario Biografico degli Italiani (in Italian). Vol. 84: Piovene–Ponzo. Rome: Institute of the Italian Encyclopaedia. ISBN 978-88-12-00032-6.
- Capucci, M. (2002). "Pona, Francesco". The Oxford Companion to Italian Literature. Oxford University Press.
- Albani, Hélène (1989). "Un roman baroque oublié: l'«Ormondo» de Francesco Pona (1635) entre nouveauté et conformisme". Esperienze Letterarie. XIV (4): 37–57.
- Maggi, Armando (2000). "Visual and verbal communication in Francesco Pona's Cardiomorphoseos". Word & Image. 16 (2): 212–224. doi:10.1080/02666286.2000.10435683.
- Gallinaro, Ilaria (2004). "Il "Cardiomorphoseos" di Francesco Pona". Lettere Italiane. 56 (4): 570–601. JSTOR 26266967.
- Buccini, Stefania (2006). "Francesco Pona autore di teatro". Scena del mondo : studi sul teatro per Franco Fido. Ravenna: Longo. pp. 1–11. doi:10.1400/55563.
- Buccini, Stefania (2006). "Pona ritrovato: Il primo di agosto celebrato da alcune giovani ad una fonte". Seicento e Settecento. I: 25–32.
- Buccini, Stefania (2013). Francesco Pona: l'ozio lecito della scrittura. Florence: Leo S. Olschki. ISBN 9788822261304.
- Benzi, Gaia (2016). "Il Parthenio di Francesco Pona". Filologia e Critica. 2 (XLI): 271–289. doi:10.1400/266544.
