= Nicolas Coeffeteau =

French theologian, poet and historian

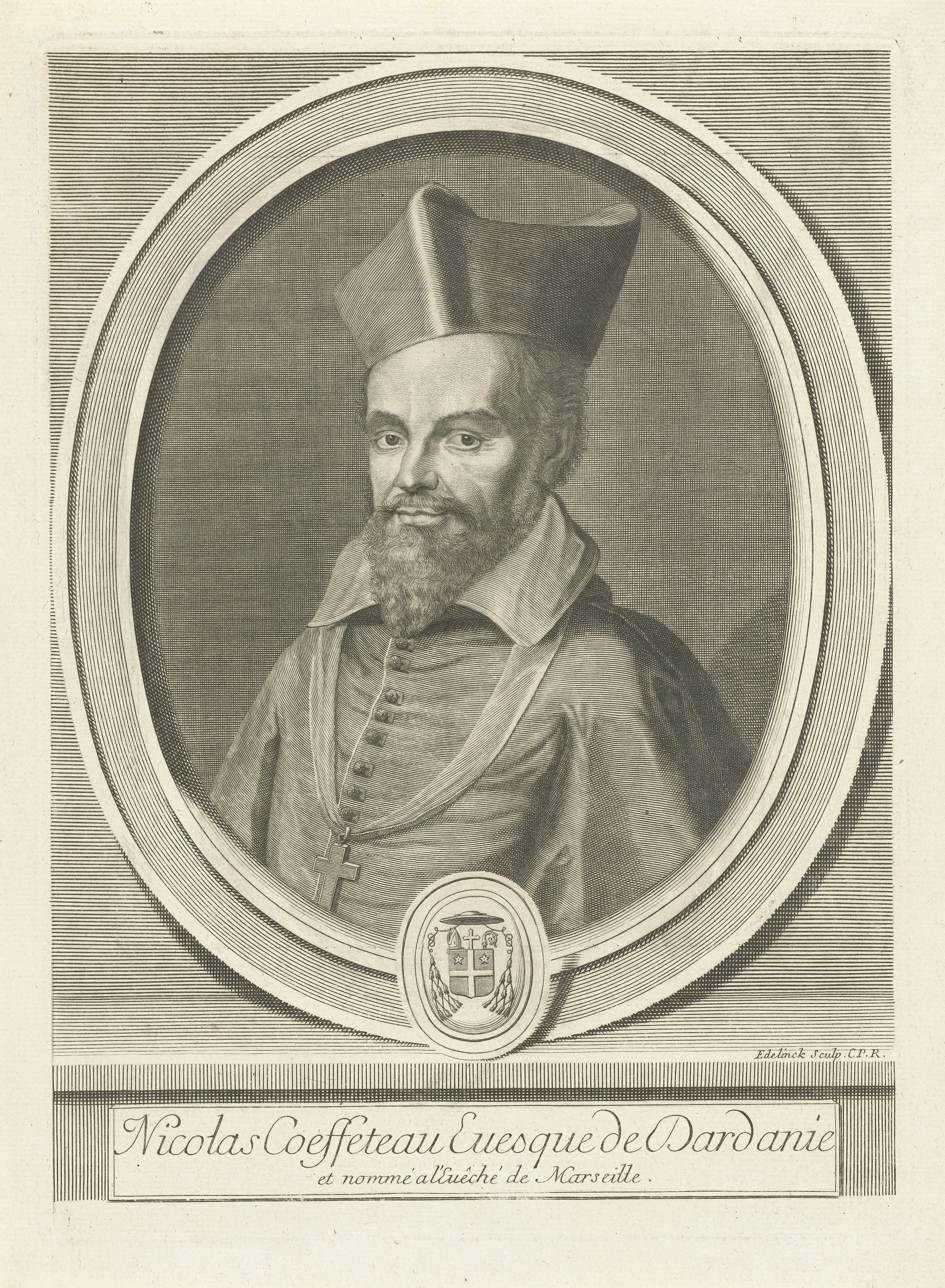
- Nicolas Coeffeteau. Engraving by Gerard Edelinck.
- Born: 1574; Saint-Calais
- Died: 1623 (aged 48–49)

Nicolas Coeffeteau (1574 – 21 April 1623) was a French theologian, poet and historian born at Saint-Calais.

He entered the Dominican order and lectured on philosophy at Paris, being also ordinary preacher to Henry IV, and afterwards ambassador at Rome.

In 1606 he was vicar-general of the congregation of France, and received from Marie de' Medici the revenues of the sees of Lombez and Saintes. He also administered the diocese of Metz, and was nominated to the diocese of Marseille in 1621, but ill health obliged him here to take a coadjutor.

Coeffeteau won considerable distinction in the controversy against the Protestant reformers and also wrote a History of Rome from Augustus to Constantine. Many of his theological writings were collected in one volume (Paris, 1622), and at the time of his death he was engaged on a translation of the New Testament which he left in manuscript. He was buried in the now demolished church of the Couvent des Jacobins in Paris.

He was acclaimed for his command of the French language. Claude Favre de Vaugelas cited him as one of the two masters of the language at the time -"Nicolas Coeffeteau, dominicain, évêque de Marseille, un des fondateurs de la prose française, 1574-1623".

== Works ==
- Premier Essay des questions théologiques traitées en nostre langue selon le stile de S. Thomas et des autres scolastiques (1607)
- Harangue funebre prononcee à Paris en l'eglise de sainct Benoist, au service faict pour le repos de l'ame de Henry IIII (1610). Texte en ligne :
- Response au livre intitulé Le Mystère d'iniquité, du sieur Du Plessis (1614)
- Response au manifeste publié par les Perturbateurs du repos de l'Estat (1617). Online text :
- Tableau des passions humaines, de leurs causes et de leurs effets (1620). Online text :
- Examen du livre du sieur Du Plessis contre la messe, composé il y a environ dix-huit ans par messire Jacques Davy, maintenant cardinal Du Perron et publié par messire Nicolas Coeffeteau (1620)
- Œuvres du R. P. en Dieu F. Nic. Coëffeteau, contenant un nouveau Traicté des noms de l'Eucharistie, auquel est refuté tout ce que les Srs Du Plessis, Casaubon et M. Pierre Dumoulin, ministre de Charenton, ont escrit sur ce sujet contre la doctrine de l'Église, avec divers autres traictez ci-devant publiez par le mesme autheur (1622)
- Histoire romaine, contenant tout ce qui s'est passé de plus mémorable depuis le commencement de l'empire d'Augustus, jusqu'à celui de Constantin le Grand. Avec l'Épitome de Florus (1623). Online text: . Mode texte :
- Les Merveilles de la Sainte Eucharistie discourues et défendues contre les infidelles (1631)

=== Translations ===
- Histoire romaine de Lucius Annaeus Florus mise en nostre langue par F. Nicolas Coeffeteau (1615)
- La Montaigne Saincte de la tribulation, qui est un traicté des afflictions et de leurs remèdes, composé premièrement en italien par le Révérend Père Jacques Affinati, et puis mis en françois par F.-N. Coeffeteau (translated from Giacomo Affinati d'Acuto, 1620)
- Histoire de Poliarque et d'Argénis, par F. N. Coeffeteau évêque de Marseille (abridged translation from John Barclay's book the Argenis, 1624)
- Tableau de la pénitence de la Magdeleine, par F. Nicolas Coëffeteau. Nouvelle édition enrichie de plusieurs discours (translated from De Maria Magdalena by Origen, 1625)
