= Cydonius =

Cydonius may refer to:

- Demetrios Kydones (1324–1398), Byzantine theologian, translator, writer, and statesman
- Prochorus Cydones (c. 1330–c. 1369), Eastern Orthodox monk, theologian, and linguist
- Andreas Eudaemon-Joannis (1566–1625), Greek Jesuit, natural philosopher, and controversialist
