= Joseph Justus Scaliger =

French classical scholar (1540–1609)

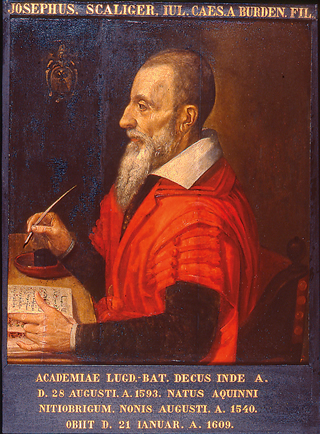
Scaliger by Jan Cornelisz. van 't Woudt (1608)

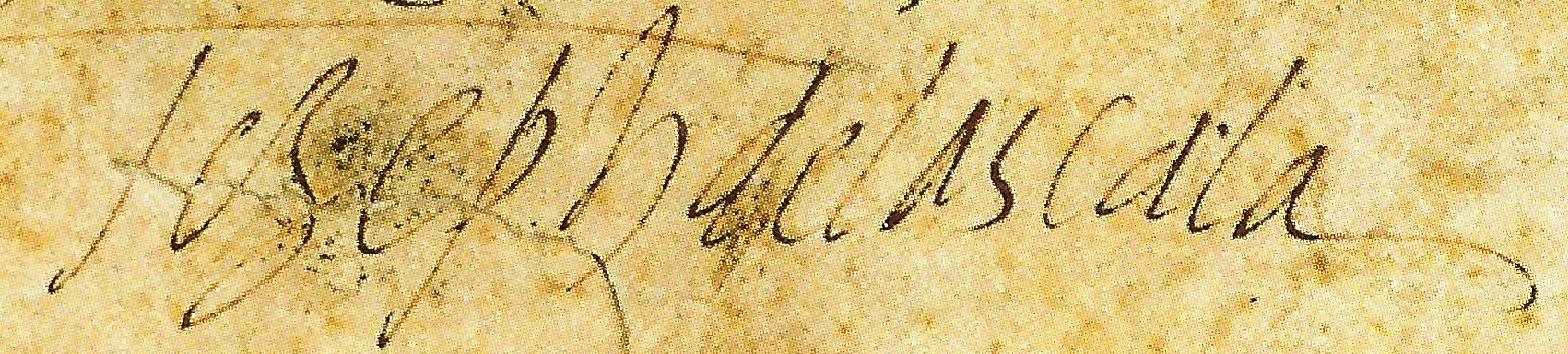
Scaliger signature Joseph de la Scala, on a receipt for the university library keys from librarian Paulus Merula, Leiden, 3 September 1598. Leiden University Libraries.

Joseph Justus Scaliger (/ˈskælɪdʒər/; 5 August 1540 – 21 January 1609) was a Franco-Italian philologist and historian, known for expanding the notion of classical history from Greek and Ancient Roman history to include Persian, Babylonian, Jewish and Ancient Egyptian history. A Protestant convert, he spent the last sixteen years of his life in the Netherlands.

== Early life ==
In 1540, Scaliger was born in Agen, France, to Italian scholar and physician Julius Caesar Scaliger and his wife, Andiette de Roques Lobejac. His only formal education was three years of study at the College of Guienne in Bordeaux, which ended in 1555 due to an outbreak of the bubonic plague. Until his death in 1558, Julius Scaliger taught his son Latin and poetry; he was made to write at least 80 lines of Latin a day.

== University and travels ==
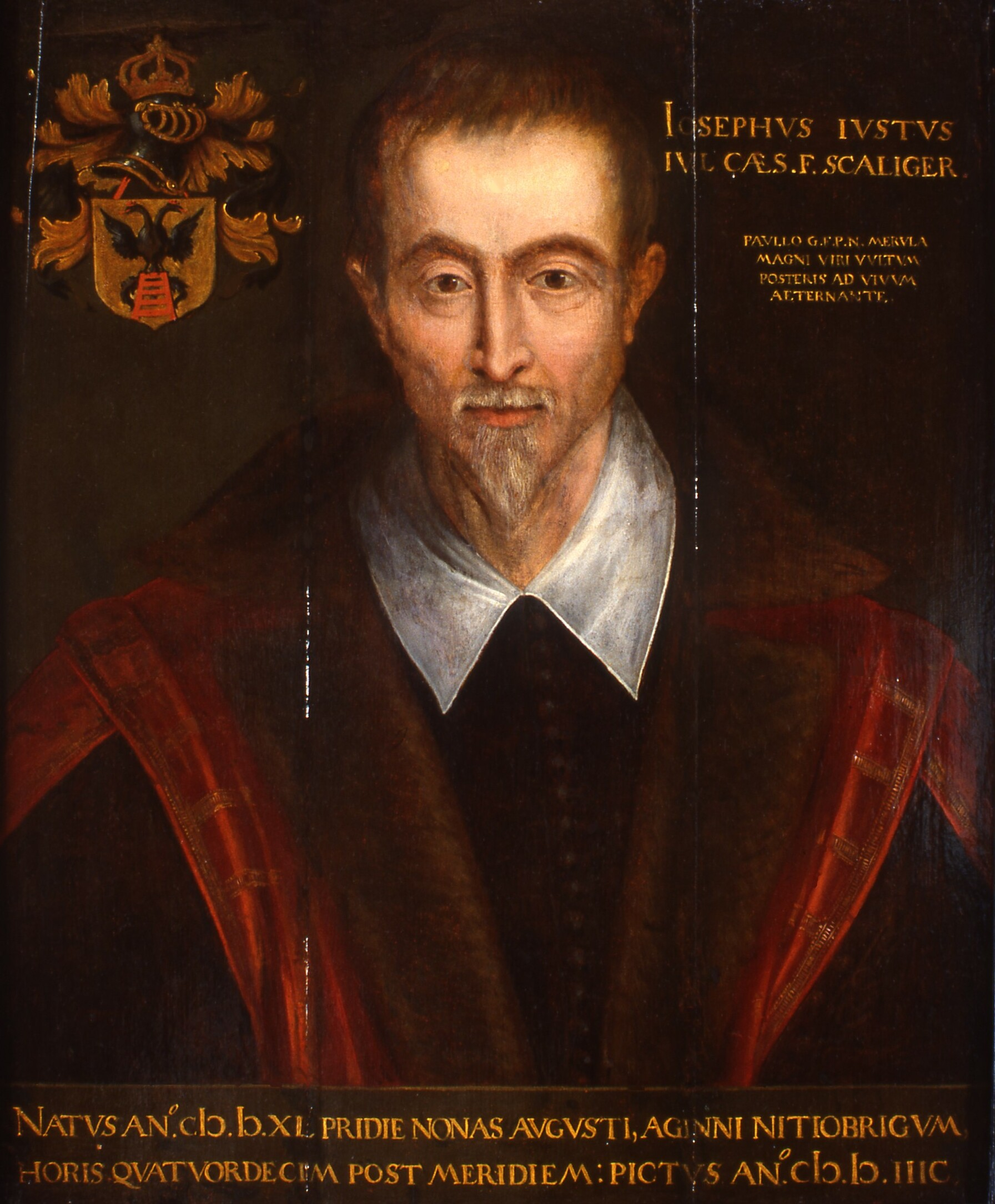
Portrait of Josephus Justus Scaliger, 1597

After his father's death, Scaliger spent four years at the University of Paris, where he studied Greek under Adrianus Turnebus. After two months, he concluded that he was not in a position to profit from Turnebus's lectures. He read Homer in twenty-one days, and afterwards read other classical Greek poets, orators, and historians, forming a grammar for himself as he went along. At the suggestion of Guillaume Postel, after learning Greek, he learned Hebrew, and then Arabic, becoming proficient in both.

According to Christie and Sandys, his most important teacher was Jean Dorat, who imparted both knowledge and enthusiasm. It was to Dorat that Scaliger owed his home for the next thirty years of his life, for in 1563 the professor recommended him to Louis de Chasteigner, the young lord of La Roche-Posay, as a companion in his travels. The two men formed a close friendship which lasted until Louis's death in 1595. The travellers first went to Rome. There they found Marc Antoine Muret, who, when at Bordeaux and Toulouse, had been an occasional visitor of Julius Caesar Scaliger at Agen. Muret introduced the younger Scaliger to a number of useful contacts.

After visiting a large part of Italy, the travellers moved on to England and Scotland, passing through the town of La Roche-Posay on their way. During his time in the British Isles, Scaliger formed an unfavourable opinion of the English, objecting in particular to what he regarded as their harshness and their inhospitable treatment of foreigners. He was also disappointed at finding only a few Greek manuscripts and, in his opinion, few learned men. It was not until a much later period that he became close to Richard Thomson and other Englishmen. Over the course of his travels, he became a Protestant.

== France, Geneva, and back to France ==
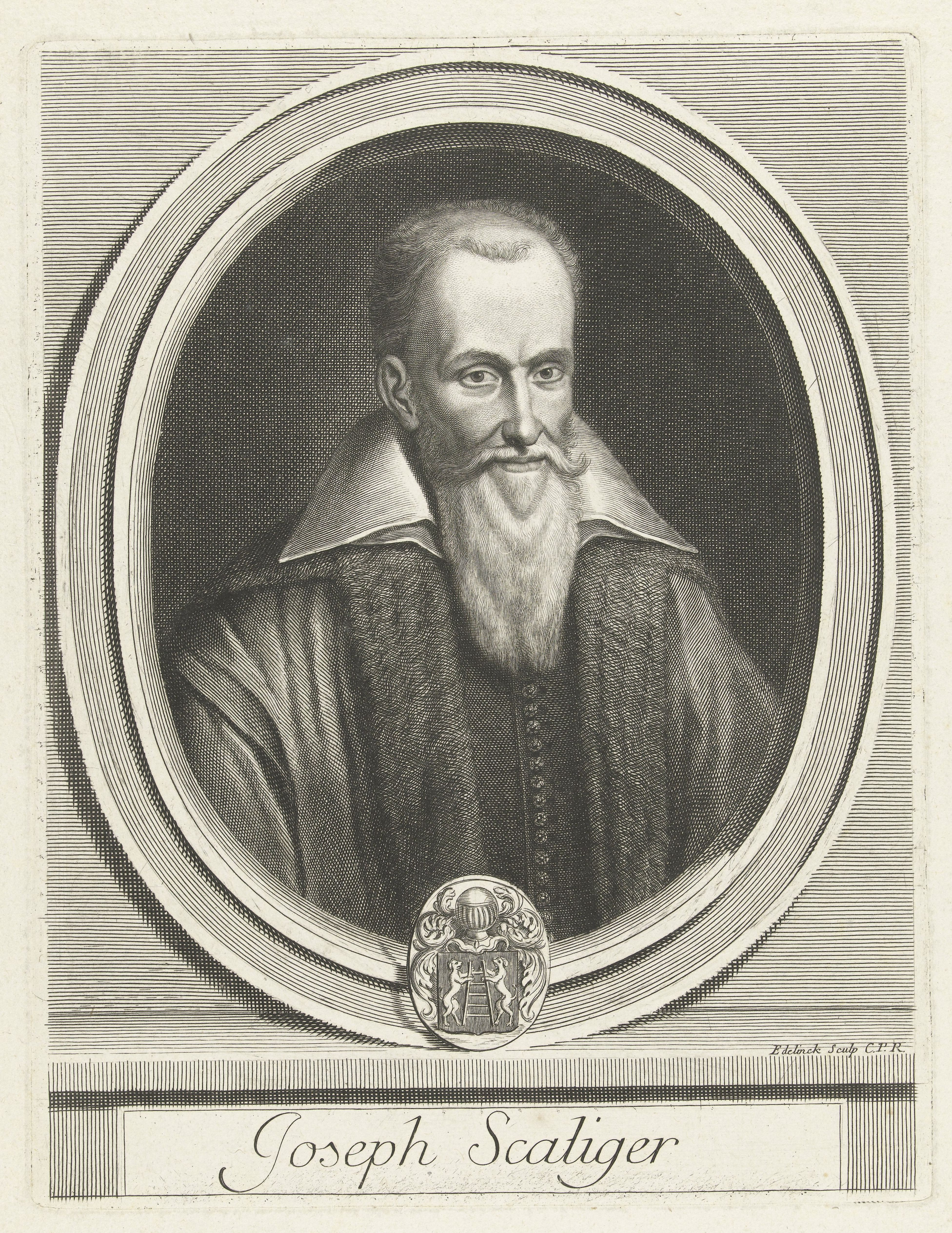
Scaliger, in a print by Gérard Edelinck (late 17th century)

On his return to France, he spent three years with the Chastaigners, accompanying them to their different châteaux in Poitou, as the calls of the civil war required. In 1570 he accepted the invitation of Jacques Cujas and proceeded to Valence to study jurisprudence. He remained three years, profiting not only from the lectures but even more from the library of Cujas, which filled seven or eight rooms and included five hundred manuscripts.

The St Bartholomew's Day Massacre – which occurred just before he was to accompany the bishop of Valence on an embassy to Poland – caused Scaliger to flee, alongside other Huguenots, to Geneva, where he was appointed a professor at the Academy of Geneva. There he lectured on Aristotle's Organon and Cicero's De Finibus. His students were reportedly satisfied, but Scaliger himself was not: he disliked lecturing and grew tired of the local preachers. In 1574 he returned to France and made his home for the next twenty years with Chastaigner.

Details of his life during this period appear in the Lettres françaises inédites de Joseph Scaliger, edited by Tamizey de Larroque (Agen, 1881). He moved constantly through Poitou and the Limousin as the civil war required, occasionally taking his turn as a guard and on at least one occasion trailing a pike on an expedition against the Leaguers, with no access to libraries and frequently separated from his own books. He had, however, what few contemporary scholars possessed: leisure and freedom from financial cares.

== Academic output ==
It was during this period of his life that he composed and published his books of historical criticism. His editions of the Catalecta (1575), of Festus (1575), and of Catullus, Tibullus and Propertius (1577) sought to establish the meaning and force of each author's text. He was among the first to set out and apply systematic rules of criticism and revision, and to change textual criticism from a series of haphazard guesses into what Mark Pattison called a "rational procedure subject to fixed laws".

These works established Scaliger's standing among his contemporaries as a Latin scholar and critic. His edition of Manilius (1579) and his De emendatione temporum (1583) went further, revising established ideas of ancient chronology by showing that ancient history was not confined to that of the Greeks and Romans, but also comprised that of the Persians, the Babylonians and the Egyptians, hitherto neglected, and that of the Jews, hitherto treated as a thing apart; and that the historical narratives and fragments of each of these, and their several systems of chronology, must be critically compared. According to Christie and Sandys, it was this innovation that distinguished Scaliger from his contemporaries, though neither they nor those who immediately followed appear to have appreciated it, valuing instead his emendatory criticism and his skill in Greek. His commentary on Manilius is a treatise on ancient astronomy and forms an introduction to De emendatione temporum; in that work, Scaliger investigates ancient systems of determining epochs, calendars and computations of time, drawing on the work of Nicolaus Copernicus and other contemporary astronomers.

In the remaining years of his life, he expanded on his work in the De emendatione. He reconstructed the lost Chronicle of Eusebius, a document of particular value for ancient chronology. He printed it in 1606 in his Thesaurus temporum, in which he collected, restored and arranged every chronological relic extant in Greek or Latin.

== The Netherlands ==
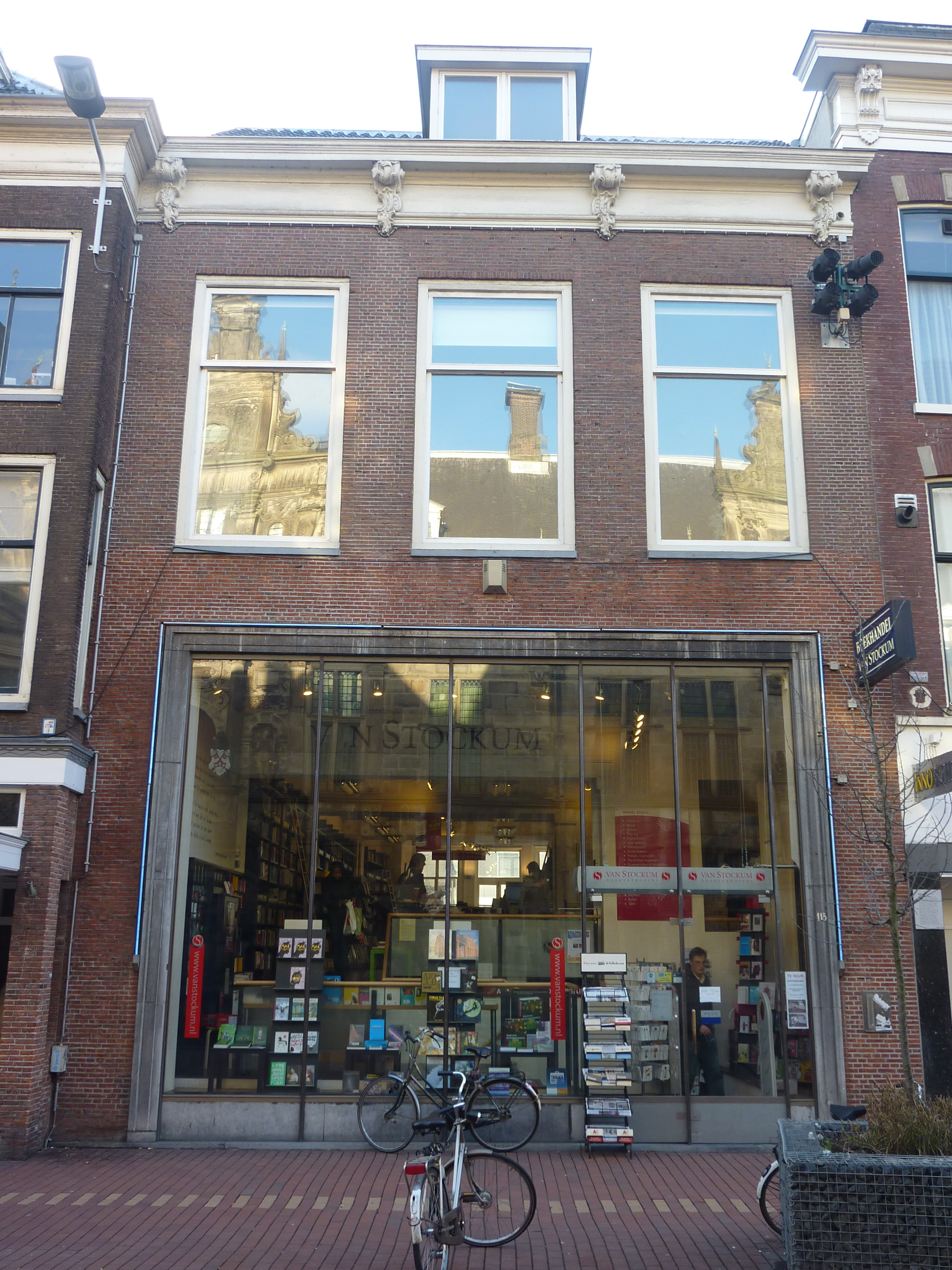
Scaliger's home in Leiden, Breestraat 113, in 2010.

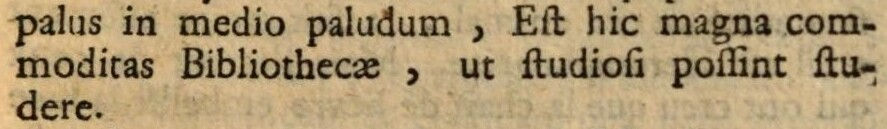
Scaliger's opinion on Leiden and its university library in 1606: [Leiden is situated in] a marsh in the midst of marshes, Here is the great convenience of a library so that students can study. Scaligerana Ou Bons Mots, etc., 1695.

When Justus Lipsius retired from the University of Leiden in 1590, the university and its protectors, the States-General of the Netherlands and the Prince of Orange, resolved to appoint Scaliger as his successor. He declined; he disliked lecturing, and some among his friends believed, mistakenly, that with the success of Henry IV learning would flourish in France and Protestantism would be no barrier to his advancement. The invitation was renewed a year later on the terms that Scaliger would not be required to lecture, and that the university wished only for his presence, leaving him free to dispose of his own time. Scaliger accepted this offer provisionally. Midway through 1593 he set out for the Netherlands, where he passed the remaining sixteen years of his life, never returning to France. He received a substantial income and was treated with considerable deference; his claimed rank as a prince of Verona, a sensitive issue for the Scaligeri, was recognised. As Leiden lies between The Hague and Amsterdam, Scaliger was able to move in the social circles of both cities as well as the scholarly circle of Leiden.

During the first seven years of his residence in Leiden, his reputation was at its highest point, and Christie and Sandys describe his literary judgment in this period as unquestioned and his opinion as capable of making or breaking a rising reputation. He was surrounded by young men eager to profit from his conversation. He encouraged Grotius, then a youth of sixteen, to edit Martianus Capella. Daniel Heinsius, at first his favourite pupil, became his closest friend, and he was said to have grieved deeply at the early death of the younger Dousa.

At the same time, Scaliger made numerous enemies. He had little tolerance for what he regarded as half-learning, or for dishonesty in argument or quotation, and his sarcasm and his written attacks reached those they were aimed at. Christie and Sandys also judged that he was not always right: he relied heavily on a memory that was occasionally unreliable, some of his emendations were unsound, and in laying the foundations of a science of ancient chronology he sometimes proceeded from weak hypotheses or an imperfect induction of facts. They add that he sometimes misunderstood the astronomical science of the ancients, and that of Copernicus and Tycho Brahe, and that he was not a mathematician.

== Disagreements with the Jesuits ==
The results of Scaliger's method of historical criticism challenged Catholic controversialists and the authenticity of a number of documents on which they relied. The Jesuits, who aspired to be the source of all scholarship and criticism, saw his writings and authority as an obstacle to their claims. Muret, in the latter part of his life, professed the strictest orthodoxy; Lipsius had been reconciled to the Church of Rome; Isaac Casaubon was supposed to be wavering, but Scaliger was known to be an irreconcilable Protestant. As long as his intellectual standing was unquestioned, according to Christie and Sandys, the Protestants held the advantage in learning and scholarship. His opponents therefore aimed less at answering his criticisms than at attacking him personally and destroying his reputation.

== Veronese descent ==
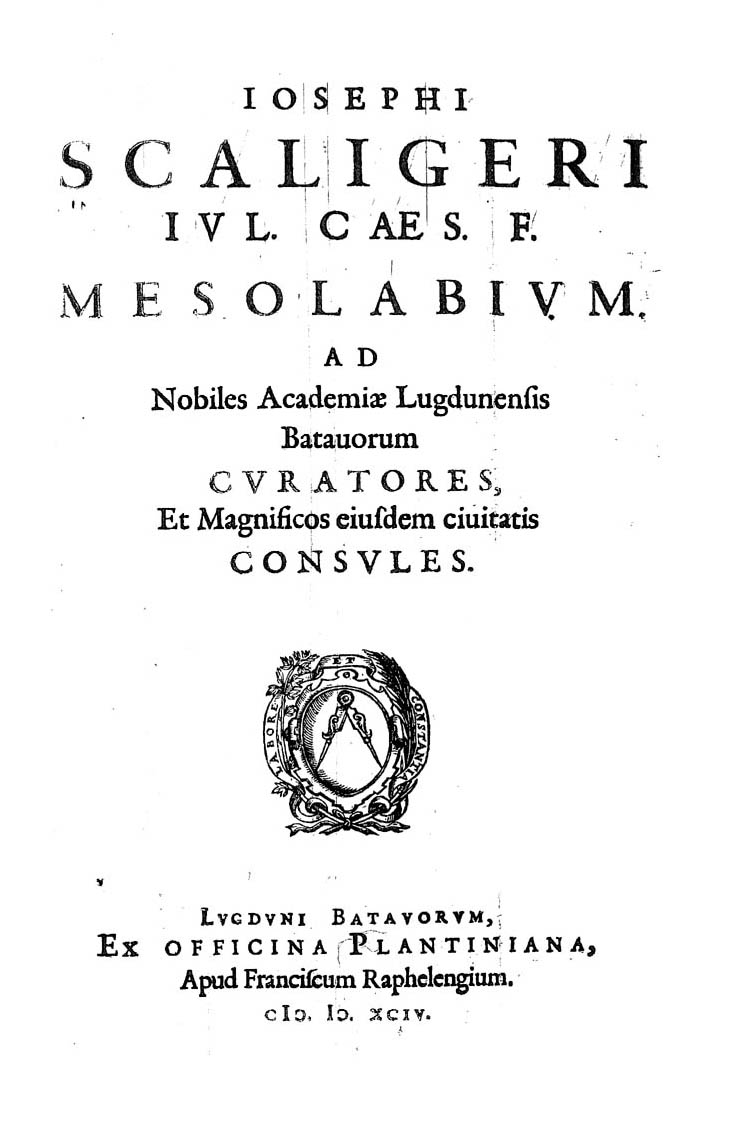
Mesolabium, 1594

In 1594, Scaliger had published his Epistola de vetustate et splendore gentis Scaligerae et JC Scaligeri vita. In 1601, Gaspar Scioppius, then in the service of the Jesuits, published his Scaliger Hypobolimaeus ("The Supposititious Scaliger"), a quarto volume of more than four hundred pages. The author purports to point out five hundred lies in Scaliger's Epistola de vetustate, but the main argument of the book is to show the falsity of his claim to belong to the family of La Scala, and of the narrative of his father's early life. Pattison wrote that no stronger proof could be given of the impression produced by this philippic than that it had become the main source for Scaliger's biography as it then stood in reference works.

The publication of Scaliger Hypobolimaeus was a serious blow to Scaliger. Whatever his father Julius had believed, Joseph had never doubted himself to be a prince of Verona, and in his Epistola had set out all that he had heard from his father. He wrote a reply to Scioppius entitled Confutatio fabulae Burdonum. Pattison regarded it as a complete refutation; Christie and Sandys disagreed, noting that although Scaliger argued that Scioppius had committed more blunders than he corrected, he produced no proof of his father's descent from the La Scala family or of any of the events narrated by Julius before he arrived at Agen, and did not address the central point, namely that William, the last prince of Verona, had no son Nicholas who could have been the alleged grandfather of Julius.

The Confutatio had little success, and Scioppius was said to boast that his book had killed Scaliger. The Confutatio was Scaliger's last work. Five months after it appeared, on 21 January 1609, at four in the morning, he died in Leiden in the presence of his pupil and friend Heinsius. In his will, Scaliger bequeathed his collection of manuscripts and books (tous mes livres de langues étrangères, Hebraiques, Syriens, Arabiques, Ethiopiens) to Leiden University Library.

== Works ==
- Mesolabium (in Latin). Leiden: Franciscus Raphelengius (1.). 1594.
- Cyclometrica elementa duo (in Latin). Leiden: Franciscus Raphelengius (1.). 1594.
- Iosephi Scaligeri Elenchus et Castigatio calendarij Gregoriani (in Latin). Roma: Luigi Zanetti. 1595.

== See also ==
- History of scholarship
- Julian Period – a tricyclic system of years proposed by Scaliger
- New chronology (Fomenko) – a pseudohistorical theory that rejects Scaliger's chronology
