= Andreas Eudaemon-Joannis =

Greek Jesuit natural philosopher and controversialist (1566–1625)

Andreas Eudaemon-Joannis (1566–1625) was a Greek Jesuit, natural philosopher and controversialist. He was sometimes known as Cydonius.

== Life ==
He entered the Society of Jesus in 1581, in Italy. He was at the Collegio Romano, where in 1597–8 he lectured on the Physics and other works of Aristotle; he wrote himself on projectile motion. He was at Padua from 1601, where he discussed the "ship's mast experiment" (see Galileo's ship) with Galileo Galilei. This meeting was before 1606.

Eudaemon-Joannis took a deathbed statement from Bellarmine in 1621. He became rector of the Greek College, Rome in 1622. He was theologian and advisor to Cardinal Francesco Barberini who went on a mission as legate to Paris in 1624/5. An unpopular insistence on the formalities was attributed to him, at a time of tension between the Jesuits and the French Catholic Church. He died in Rome, on 24 December 1625.

== Works ==
He defended Robert Bellarmine, in particular, against English attacks over the allegiance oath of James I. One work was directed against Edward Coke, continuing a defence of Henry Garnet. The pamphlet war drew in Isaac Casaubon, and Eudaemon-Joannis was attacked by name by John Prideaux.

Eudaemon-Joannis was sometimes considered to be a pseudonym in this debate, for example for Scioppius; or for the French Jesuit Jean L'Heureux, something repeated in the Criminal Trials of David Jardine in the 19th century. A 1625 work, the Admonitio attacking Louis XIII, that appeared under the pseudonym G.G.R., has been attributed both to Eudaemon-Joannis and to Jacob Keller. Cardinal Richelieu believed Eudaemon-Joannis to be the author; Carolus Scribani was another suspect, and François Garasse was questioned, as part of the struggle of Gallicanism against the Jesuits.

- Adversus Roberti Abb. Oxoniensis de Antichristo sophismata (1609)
- Ad actionem proditoriam Edouardi Coqui, apologia pro R.P. Henrico Garneto (1610)
- Confutatio Anti-Cotoni (1611)
- Parallelus Torti ac Tortoris (1611), against Lancelot Andrewes on behalf of Bellarmine.
- Castigatio Apocalypsis apocalypeos Th. Breghtmanni (1611); against Thomas Brightman.
- Responsio ad epistolam Isaaci Casauboni; attack on Casaubon and reply to his letter to Fronto Ducaeus. It alleged Casaubon wrote on behalf of James I for money.
- Epistola monitoria, ad Ioannem Barclaium (1613); against John Barclay, who had written in defence of his father William Barclay's De potestate papae.
- Epistola ad amicum Gallum super dissertatione politica Leidhresseri (1613); a reply to Desiderius Heraldus (Didier Hérault or Hérauld) writing as David Leidhresserus.
- Refutatio exercitationum Isaaci Casauboni libris duobus comprehensa (1617)
- Defensio annalium ecclesiasticorum Caesaris Baronii (1617)
- Admonitio ad lectores librorum M. Antonii de dominis (1619)
- Excerpta ex litteris de pio obitu Rob. cardinalis Bellarmini (1621)
