= Robert Burhill =

Robert Burhill or Burghill (1572–1641) was an English clergyman, known as a prolific controversialist.

== Life ==
He was born at Dymock, Gloucestershire, and entered Corpus Christi College, Oxford, on 13 January 1588, proceeding B.A. on 5 February 1591, M.A. on 12 December 1594, B.D. on 7 July 1603, and D.D. on 2 June 1632. He became a probationer fellow of his college on 20 March 1585, obtained the rectories of Northwold, near Thetford, Norfolk, and of Snailwell, Cambridgeshire, and a prebend in Hereford Cathedral on 20 January 1604.

His learning, with a knowledge of Greek and Hebrew, attracted the attention of Sir Walter Raleigh, who received assistance from Burhill in the composition of his History of the World. He died at Northwold in October 1641, and was buried in the chancel of the church there. A monument was erected to his memory by Samuel Knight, archdeacon of Berkshire, about 1740.

== Works ==
He intervened in 1606 in a controversy between John Howson and Thomas Pye as to the marriage of divorced persons. In a Latin tractate (Oxford, 1606) Burhill supported Howson's contention that marriage in such cases was unlawful, and refuted Pye's opposite arguments. His pamphlet was bound up with a second edition of Howson's Thesis.

In the controversy excited by Lancelot Andrewes's Tortura Torti, a reply to Cardinal Bellarmine, Burhill contributed Responsio pro Tortura Torti contra Martinum Becanum Jesuitam, London, 1611 (against Martin Becanus; De Potestate regia et Usurpatione papali pro Tortura Torti contra Parellum Andr. Eudæmon, Oxford, 1613 (against Andreas Eudaemon Joannes); and Assertio pro Jure regio contra Martini Becani Jesuitæ Controversiam Anglicanam, London, 1613, together with a defence of John Buckeridge's answer to Cardinal Bellarmine's apology.

Burhill's printed works also include a Latin panegyric on James I, inviting him to visit Oxford (Oxford, 1603), and a preface to a sermon (London, 1602) of Miles Smith. Left in manuscript were: a commentary by Burhill on the difficult passages in the Book of Job; another manuscript tractate in support of monarchy and episcopacy; and a manuscript Latin poem in ten books, entitled Britannia Scholastica, vel de Britanniæ rebus scholasticis.
