= Imperfect induction =

Research concept

Imperfect induction is the process of inferring from a sample of a group to what is characteristic of the whole group.
