= Isaac Casaubon =

European classical scholar and philologist (1559–1614)

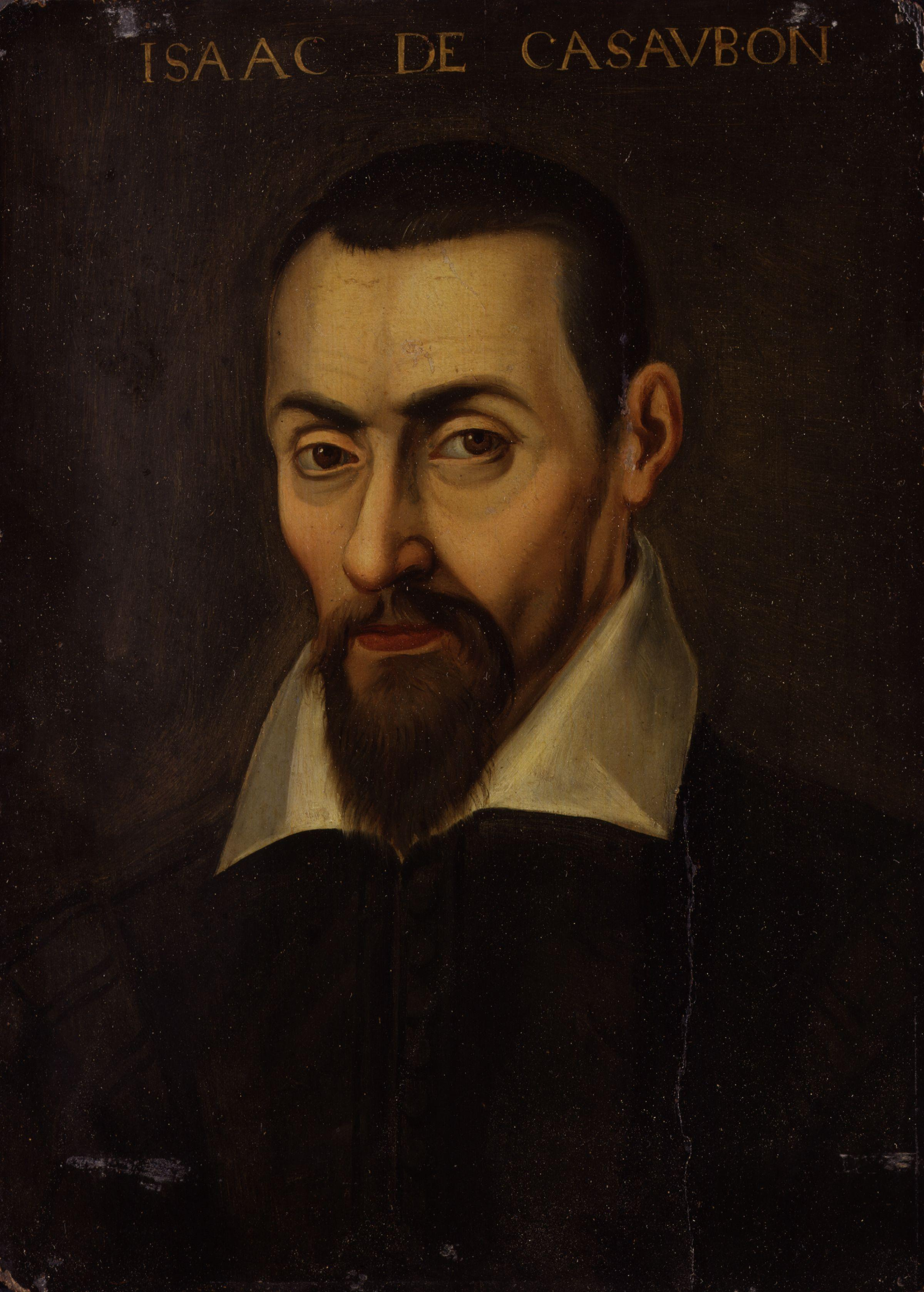
- Born: 18 February 1559; Geneva, Republic of Geneva
- Died: 1 July 1614 (aged 55); London, England
- Education: University of Geneva
- Occupations: Classical scholar, philologist

Isaac Casaubon (/kəˈsɔːbən/; French: [kazobɔ̃]; 18 February 1559 – 1 July 1614) was a classical scholar and philologist, first in France and then later in England.

His son Méric Casaubon was also a classical scholar.

== Life ==
=== Early life ===
He was born in Geneva to two French Huguenot refugees. The family returned to France after the Edict of Saint-Germain in 1562, and settled at Crest in Dauphiné, where Arnaud Casaubon, Isaac's father, became minister of a Huguenot congregation. Until he was nineteen, Isaac had no education other than that given him by his father. Arnaud was away from home for long periods in the Calvinist camp, and the family regularly fled to the hills to hide from bands of armed Catholics who patrolled the country. It was in a cave in the mountains of Dauphiné, after the St Bartholomew's Day's Massacre, that Isaac received his first lesson in Greek, based on Isocrates' Ad Demonicum.

At the age of nineteen Isaac was sent to the Academy of Geneva, where he read Greek under Franciscus Portus, a Cretan. Portus died in 1581, recommending Casaubon, then only twenty-two, as his successor. He remained at Geneva as professor of Greek until 1596. There he married twice, his second wife being Florence Estienne, daughter of the scholar-printer Henri Estienne. At Geneva, Casaubon lacked example, encouragement and assistance and struggled against the troops of the Catholic dukes of Savoy, but became a consummate Greek and classical scholar. He spent all the money he could spare on books, including copying classics that were not then in print. Even though Henri Estienne, Theodore de Beza (rector of the university and professor of theology), and Jacques Lect (Lectius), were men of superior learning, they often had no time for Casaubon.

Casaubon sought help by cultivating the acquaintance of foreign scholars, as Geneva, the metropolis of Calvinism, received a constant stream of visitors. He eventually met Henry Wotton, a poet and diplomat, who lodged with him and borrowed his money. More importantly, he met Richard Thomson ("Dutch" Thomson), fellow of Clare College, Cambridge, and through Thomson came to the attention of Joseph Scaliger. Scaliger and Casaubon first exchanged letters in 1594. They never met, but kept up a lengthy correspondence that shows their growing admiration, esteem and friendship. Influential French men of letters, the Protestant Jacques Bongars, the Catholic Jacques de Thou, and the Catholic convert Philippe Canaye (sieur de Fresnes) endeavoured to get Casaubon invited to France.

In 1596, they succeeded, and Casaubon accepted a post at the University of Montpellier, with the titles of conseiller du roi (king's advisor) and professeur stipendié aux langues et bonnes lettres (salaried professor of languages and literatures). He stayed there for only three years, with several prolonged absences. He was badly treated and poorly paid by the university authorities. Casaubon began to see the editing of Greek books as a more suitable job for him. At Geneva he had produced some notes on Diogenes Laërtius, Theocritus and the New Testament. He debuted as an editor with a complete edition of Strabo (1587), of which he was so ashamed afterwards that he apologized to Scaliger for it. This was followed by the text of Polyaenus, an editio princeps, 1589; a text of Aristotle, 1590; and a few notes contributed to Estienne's editions of Dionysius of Halicarnassus and Pliny's Epistolae. His edition of Theophrastus's Characteres (1592), is the first example of his peculiar style of illustrative commentary, at once apposite and profuse. When he left for Montpellier he was already engaged upon his magnum opus, his editing of and commentary on Athenaeus.

=== Travels and tribulations ===
In 1598 Casaubon was at Lyon, overseeing the printing of his Athenaeus. Here he lived in the house of Méric de Vicq, surintendant de la justice (Superintendent of Justice), a liberal-minded Catholic. Accompanied by de Vicq, Casaubon briefly visited Paris, where he was presented to King Henry IV of France. The king said something about employing Casaubon's services in the "restoration" of the fallen University of Paris. In January 1599, he received a summons to return to Paris, but the terms of the letter were so vague that Casaubon hesitated to act on it. However, he resigned his chair at Montpellier. He stayed another year at Lyon with de Vicq, where he hoped to meet the king, who was expected to visit the south. Nothing more was heard about the professorship, but instead De Vicq summoned him to Paris for important business: the Fontainebleau Conference. Casaubon was persuaded to sit as a referee on the challenge sent to Du Plessis Mornay by Cardinal Duperron. By so doing he placed himself in a false position, as Joseph Scaliger said:

"Non debebat Casaubon interesse colloquio Plessiaeano; erat asinus inter simias, doctus inter imperitos."

"Casaubon ought not to have been involved in the conference about Du Plessis; he was a donkey among monkeys, a learned man among the ignorant."

The issue was contrived that the Protestant party (Du Plessis Mornay) could not fail to lose. By concurring with this decision, Casaubon confirmed the Protestants' suspicions that, like his friend and patron, Philippe Canaye, he was contemplating abjuration. From then on, he became the object of the hopes and fears of the two religions; the Catholics lavishing promises and plying him with arguments; the Protestant ministers insinuating that he was preparing to forsake a losing cause, and only haggling about his price. Neither side could understand that Casaubon's reading of the Church Fathers led him to adopt an intermediate position between Genevan Calvinism and Ultramontanism.

Meanwhile, the king repeated his invitation to Casaubon to settle in Paris, and gave him a pension. No more was said about the university. The recent reform of the University of Paris closed its doors to all but Catholics; and though the chairs of the Collège de France were not governed by the statutes of the university, public opinion ran so violently against Protestants, that Henry IV dared not appoint a Calvinist to that position. When the king's sub-librarian Jean Gosselin died of extreme old age in 1604, Casaubon succeeded him, with a salary of 400 livres in addition to his pension.

=== Paris ===
Casaubon remained in Paris until the assassination of Henry IV in 1610. These ten years were the brightest period of his life. He had attained the reputation of being a learned man, in an age in which learning formed the sole standard of literary merit. He had money, the ability to worship as a Huguenot (though he had to travel to Hablon, ten miles from the center of Paris, or Charenton to worship), and the society of men of letters, both domestic and foreign. Above all, he had ample facilities for using Greek books, both printed and in manuscript, the want of which he had felt painfully at Geneva and Montpellier, and which only Paris could supply at that time.

Despite all these advantages, Casaubon considered many schemes for leaving Paris and settling elsewhere. Offers came to him from various quarters, including Nîmes, Heidelberg and Sedan, France. His friends Lect and Giovanni Diodati wished, rather than hoped, to get him back to Geneva. In Paris, Casaubon was still uneasy about his religion: the life of a Parisian Huguenot was always insecure, for the police were likely not strong enough to protect them against a sudden mob uprising. Since the Fontainebleau Conference, an impression prevailed that Casaubon was wavering. The Catholics told him he could gain a professorship only if he renounced Protestantism. When it became clear that Casaubon could not be bought, Henry IV, who liked Casaubon personally, took it upon himself to try to convert him. (Henry himself had converted to Catholicism in order to rule France.) The king's cardinal Duperron, in his capacity of aumonier, argued with Casaubon in the king's library. On the other hand, the Huguenot theologians, especially Pierre du Moulin, chief pastor of the church of Paris, accused Casaubon of conceding too much, and of having departed already from the lines of strict Calvinistic orthodoxy.

=== England ===
When the assassination of Henry IV gave full rein to the Ultramontane party at court, Duperron became more importunate, even menacing. Casaubon began to pay attention to overtures from the bishops and the court of England. In October 1610 he came to England in the suite of the ambassador, Lord Wotton of Marley (brother of Casaubon's early friend Henry Wotton), an official invitation having been sent him by Richard Bancroft, Archbishop of Canterbury. He had the most flattering reception from King James I, who often sent for him to discuss theological matters. The English bishops were delighted to find that the great French scholar was a ready-made Anglican, who had arrived, by independent study of the Fathers, at the very via media (middle way) between Puritanism and Catholicism which was becoming the fashion in the English Church. Casaubon, though a layman, was collated to a prebendal stall in Canterbury, and a pension of £300 a year was assigned him from the exchequer. King James insisted that "I will have Mr Casaubon paid before me, my wife, and my barnes." Casaubon still retained his appointments in France, and his office as librarian: he had obtained leave of absence for the visit to England, where he was not supposed to settle permanently. In order to retain their hold on him, the queen regent, Marie de' Medici refused to allow his library to be sent over. It required a specific request from James himself to allow Madame Casaubon to bring him a part of his most necessary books. Casaubon continued to speak of himself as the servant of the regent, and to declare his readiness to return when summoned to do so.

Casaubon found great success in England. English Bishop John Overall received him and his whole family into the deanery of St Paul's, and entertained him there for a year. Lancelot Andrewes, then Bishop of Ely, also became Casaubon's friend, taking him to Cambridge, where he met with a most gratifying reception from the notabilities of the university. They went on together to the Bishop's Palace at Little Downham near Ely, where Casaubon spent six weeks of the summer of 1611, in which year he became naturalized. He accompanied the bishop on visits to nearby towns including Doddington and Wisbech. In 1613 he was taken to Oxford by Sir Henry Savile, where, amid the homage and feasting of which he was the object, his principal interest was for the manuscript treasures of the Bodleian Library. He declined the honorary degree which was offered him.

Still, Casaubon gradually discovered the serious inconveniences of his position. Having been taken up by the king and the bishops, he had to share in their rising unpopularity. The courtiers were jealous of a foreign pensioner who was so close to the king. Casaubon was especially mortified by Sir Henry Wotton's behaviour towards him, so inconsistent with their former intimacy. His windows were broken by vandals, and his children were pelted in the streets. On one occasion he appeared at Theobalds House with a black eye, having been assaulted in the street. These outrages seem to have arisen solely from the English antipathy to the Frenchman: Casaubon, though he could read an English book, could not speak English. This deficiency exposed him to insult and fraud, and restricted his social activity. It excluded him from the circle of the "wits"; and he was not accepted in the circle of the "antiquaries" like William Camden, Sir Robert Cotton and Henry Spelman.

Although Sir Henry Savile ostensibly patronized him, Casaubon could not help suspecting that it was Savile who had persuaded Richard Montagu to forestall Casaubon's book on Baronius. An exception was John Selden who was close enough to Casaubon to lend him money. Besides the jealousy of the natives, Casaubon had now to suffer the open attacks of the Jesuit pamphleteers, who, after he committed to Anglicism, detested him. Not only Joannes Eudaemon, Heribert Rosweyd and Scioppius (Gaspar Schoppe), but a respectable writer, friendly to Casaubon, Andreas Schott of Antwerp, gave currency to the insinuation that Casaubon had sold his conscience for English gold.

The most serious cause of discomfort in England was that his time was no longer his own. He was continually being summoned to one or other of James's hunting residences in order to converse. The king and the bishops compelled him to write pamphlets on the subject of the day, the royal supremacy. At last, ashamed of misappropriating Casaubon's stores of learning, they asked him to refute the popular Annals of Baronius.

In 1614 he published De rebus sacris et ecclesiasticis exercitationes XVI which consisted of a philological analysis of the Corpus Hermeticum, a series of neo-platonic texts. He placed their origin in the third or fourth century AD, rather than in a much earlier "hermetic" period to which they had generally been ascribed.

He died in London of a congenital malformation of the bladder; but his end was hastened by an unhealthy life of over-study, and by his anxiety to acquit himself creditably in his criticism on Baronius. He was buried in Westminster Abbey. The monument by which his name is there commemorated was erected in 1632 by his friend Thomas Morton when Bishop of Durham.

== Scholarship and correspondence ==
Besides the editions already mentioned, Casaubon published and commented upon Persius, Suetonius, Aeschylus, and the Scriptores Historiae Augustae. The edition of Polybius, on which he had spent vast labour, he left unfinished. His most ambitious work was his revision of the text of the Deipnosophistae of Athenaeus, with commentary. The Theophrastus perhaps exhibits his most characteristic excellences as a commentator. The Exercitationes in Baronium are but a fragment of the massive criticism which he contemplated; it failed in presenting the uncritical character of Baronius's history, and had only a moderate success, even among Protestants. His analysis of the Corpus Hermeticum overturned the previous general opinion in Europe that these texts dated from almost the time of Moses by locating them between 200 and 300 AD.

His correspondence (in Latin) was finally collected by Theodorus Janssonius van Almeloveen (Rotterdam, 1709), who prefixed to the letters a careful biography of Casaubon. But Almeloveen was acquainted with Casaubon's diary only in extract. More recently, a complete edition of all the letters written by and to Casaubon during his stay in England was published with extensive cultural-historical notes and introduction (Geneva, 2018). Casaubon's diary, Ephemerides, whose manuscript is preserved in the chapter library of Canterbury, was printed in 1850 by the Clarendon Press. It forms the most valuable record we possess of the daily life of a scholar, or man of letters, of the 16th century.

Casaubon corresponded with scholars all over Europe, including Johannes van den Driesche and, more surprisingly, one of the doctors of the Ambrosiana Library and eminent historian of Milan, Giuseppe Ripamonti.

He also corresponded with the translators of the King James Version of the Bible and helped resolve issues in the translation.

He also worked on Arabic and Turkish coins, one of the earliest Europeans to do so.

== Literary appearances ==
The scholars in Foucault's Pendulum by Umberto Eco and Middlemarch by George Eliot are named Casaubon. Mary Gentle named a character in her novels Rats and Gargoyles and the Architecture of Desire Casaubon, as an homage to Isaac Casaubon. Ross King makes mention of Casaubon in his novel Ex-Libris, where he is said to have debunked the Corpus Hermeticum as a forgery (which he probably took from Frances Yates' Giordano Bruno and the Hermetic Tradition, published in 1964).

In their book Isaac Casaubon, the Jews, and a Forgotten Chapter in Renaissance Scholarship, Anthony Grafton and Joanna Weinberg show that Casaubon was a Hebrew scholar too, taking serious interest in Jewish studies.

The Jewish bibliographer Isaac ben Jacob, in his Bibliography Otsar Hasefarim (1880), mentions notations on Michlol, the Hebrew book by David Kimhi on Hebrew grammar, which he attributes to one "Rabbi Isaac Casaubon".

== Works ==
- Casaubon, Isaac, De Satyrica Graecorum & Romanorum Satira, Paris, 1605. Facsimile ed., ed. Peter E. Medine, 1973, Scholars' Facsimiles & Reprints, ISBN 978-0-8201-1115-5.

== See also ==
- Ralph Cudworth
