= Argenis =

Book by John Barclay

Argenis is a book by Scottish writer John Barclay. It is a work of historical allegory which tells the story of the religious conflict in France under Henry III of France and Henry IV of France, and also touches on more contemporary English events, such as the Overbury scandal. The tendency is royalist, anti-aristocratic; it is told from the angle of a king who reduces the landed aristocrats' power in the interest of the "country", the interest of which is identified with that of the king.

Jennifer Morrish describes Argenis as one of "the two most influential Neo-Latin novels", along with Thomas More's Utopia.

== Some editions ==
- 1621 - Paris, Nicolas Buon (Latin)
- 1622 - London, Eliot's Court Press (Latin)
- 1623 - Frankfurt, Danielis & Davidis Aubriorum & Clementis Schleichij (Latin)
- 1625 - London, G. Purslowe for Henry Seile (First English edition)
- 1626 - Johann Barclaÿens Argenis Deutsch gemacht durch Martin Opitzen. Breslau. (First German edition)
- 1627 - Leiden, Elzevir (First printing by Elzevir)
- 1629 - Venice, G. Salis, ad instantia di P. Frambotti (Italian translation by Francesco Pona)
- 1630 - Elzevir (Second printing by Elzevir)
- 1630 - Elzevir (Third printing by Elzevir)
- 1636 - London, Syne of the Tygres Head (Second English edition)
- 1644 - Amsterdam, J. Janssonius (Second German edition)
- 1697 - Warszawa, Drukarnia OO. Pijarów, (Polish translation by Wacław Potocki)
- 1995 - New York, (Fourth printing by Argenis Jimenez)(English edition)
- 2004 - Assen–Tempe, AZ (Latin edition with English translation)

Originally published in Latin in 1621, King James asked for it to be translated into English. The first such translation was undertaken by Ben Jonson, but his version was lost in a fire which also destroyed many of his other works. Later translations were made by Kingsmill Long (1625), and Robert Le Gruys (1628). Clara Reeve translated it as The Phoenix (1772).
