= Caspar Schoppe =

German scholar (1576–1649)

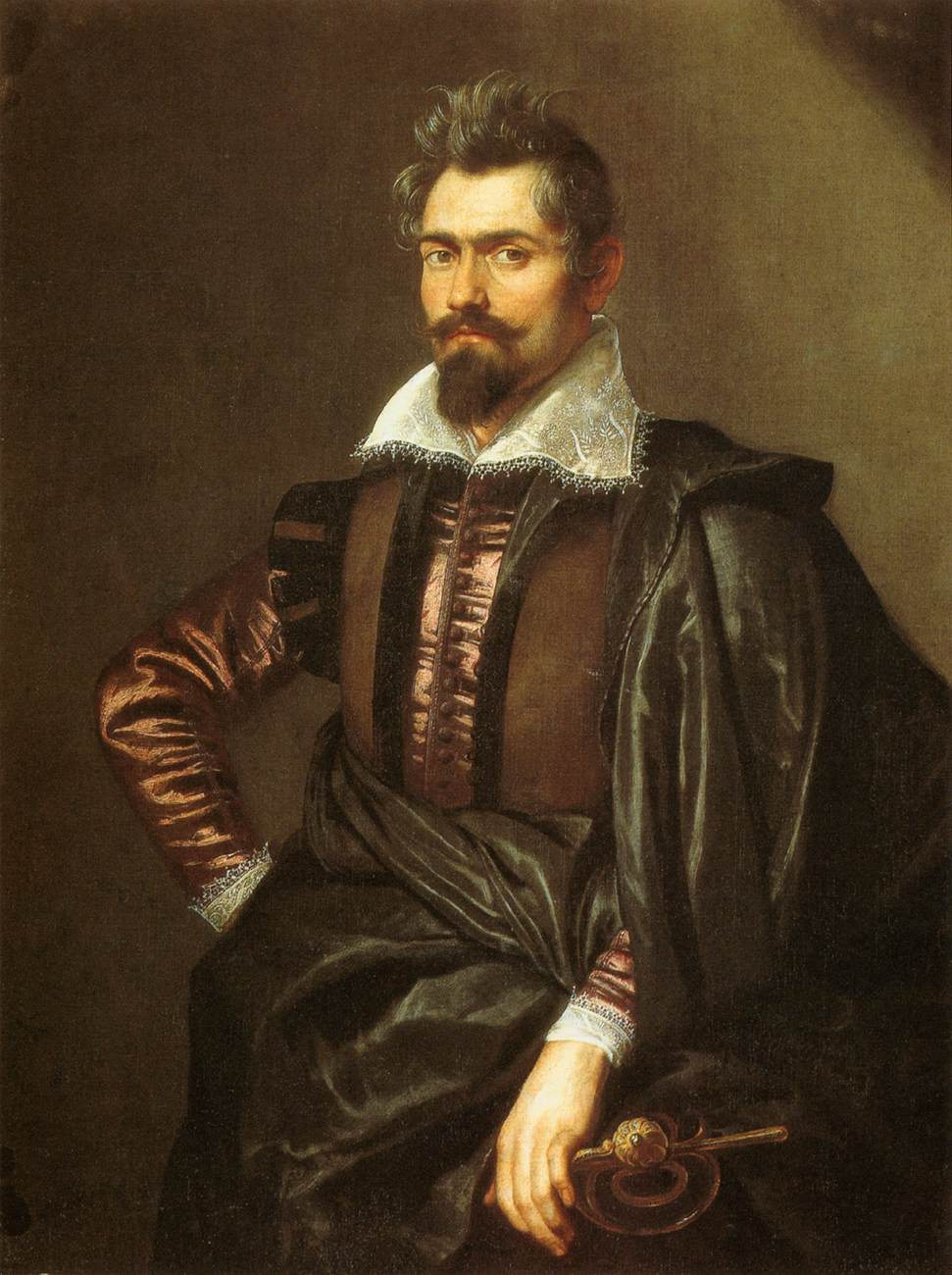
- Peter Paul Rubens, Portrait of Caspar Schoppe. c.1604-05 oil on canvas 116.0 x 88.0 cm Collection: Galleria Palatina, Palazzo Pitti, Florence
- Born: 27 May 1576; Neumarkt in der Oberpfalz
- Died: 19 November 1649 (aged 73); Padua
- Resting place: Chiesa di San Tommaso Apostolo (Padua)
- Alma mater: Heidelberg University; University of Altdorf; University of Ingolstadt
- Occupation: Philologist, author

Caspar Schoppe (27 May 1576 – 19 November 1649) was a German Catholic polemicist, philosopher and scholar.

== Life ==
He was born at Neumarkt in the upper Palatinate and studied at several German universities. He converted to Roman Catholicism in about 1599, after reading the Annales Ecclesiastici of Baronius.

Schoppe obtained the favour of Pope Clement VIII, and distinguished himself by the virulence of his writings against the Protestants. He became involved in a controversy with Joseph Justus Scaliger, formerly his intimate friend, and others; wrote Ecclesiasticus auctoritati Jacobi regis oppositus (1611), an attack upon James I of England; and in Classicum belli sacri (1619) urged the Catholic princes to wage war upon the Protestants. In about 1607, Schoppe entered the service of Ferdinand, archduke of Styria, afterwards Ferdinand II, Holy Roman Emperor, who found him very useful in rebutting the arguments of the Protestants, and who sent him on several diplomatic errands. According to Pierre Bayle, he was almost killed by some Englishmen at Madrid in 1614, and again fearing for his life he left Germany for Italy in 1617, afterwards taking part in an attack upon the Jesuits.

Anthony Grafton writes about Bayle and Scioppius: "We owe to him [Bayle] the preservation of Caspar Scioppius' description of the sparrow he watched, from his student lodgings at Ingolstadt, having intercourse twenty times and then dying--as well as Scioppius' reflection, 'O unfair lot. Is this to be granted to sparrows and denied to men?'"

Schoppe died at Padua on 19 November 1649.

== Works ==
In his Life of Sir Henry Wotton Izaak Walton, calling him Jasper Scioppius, refers to Schoppe as "a man of a restless spirit and a malicious pen." More recent material appears in Wotton And His Worlds by Gerald Curzon (2004).

Schoppe's major work is, perhaps, his Grammatica philosophica (Milan, 1628). He also wrote:

- De arte critica (1597)
- De Antichristo (1605)
- Pro auctoritate ecclesiae in decidendis fidei controversiis libellus
- Scaliger hypobolymaeus (1607), a virulent attack on Scaliger

Anti-jesuitical Works:

- Flagellum Jesuiticum (1632)
- Mysteria patrum jesuitorum (1633)
- Arcana societatis Jesu (1635).

For a fuller list of his writings see J. P. Nicéron Mémoires, (1727–1745). See also C. Nisard, Les Gladiateurs de la république des lettres (Paris. 1860).
