= John Barclay (poet) =

Scottish writer (1582-1621)

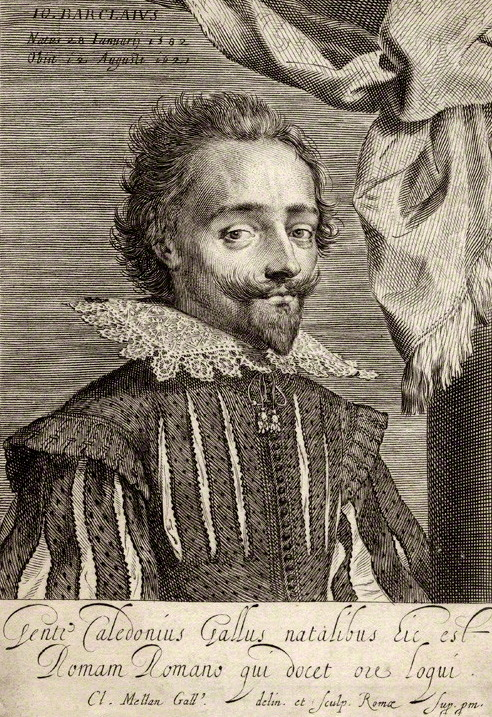
- John Barclay by Claude Mellan
- Born: 28 January 1582; Pont-à-Mousson, Lorraine, Kingdom of France
- Died: 15 August 1621 (aged 39); Rome, Papal States
- Occupation: writer
- Notable work: Argenis

John Barclay (28 January 1582 – 15 August 1621) was a Scottish writer, satirist and Neo-Latin poet.

== Life ==
He was born in Pont-à-Mousson, Lorraine, France, where his Scottish-born father, William Barclay, held the chair of civil law. His mother was a Frenchwoman. His early education was obtained at the Jesuit College at Pont-a-Mousson. While there, at the age of nineteen, he wrote a commentary on the Thebaid of Statius.

The Jesuits endeavored to induce him to join their order; but his father refused to give his consent and took him to England in 1603. Barclay had persistently maintained his Scottish nationality in his French surroundings, and probably found in James VI and I's accession an opportunity which he would not let slip. In early 1604 John Barclay presented James with a Latin poem, "Kalendae Januariae", and afterward dedicated to him the first part of his Euphormionis Satyricon (Euphormionis Lusinini Satyricon) against the Jesuits. He returned to France by 1605, when a second edition of that book appeared in Paris, having spent some time in Angers. He was the husband of a Frenchwoman, Louise Debonaire. Barclay and his wife returned to London in 1606, and there published his Sylvae, a collection of Latin poems. In 1607 the second part of the Satyricon appeared in Paris. In 1616 he went to Rome and resided there until his death on 15 August 1621, aged 39. His departure from England may have been prompted by the threat that his children would be brought up as Protestants, since they had been born in England. To the Catholic Barclay, this was unacceptable. In addition he may have been seeking a more generous patron than the somewhat parsimonious King James. In fact Barclay received a pension of some 150 pounds from the Pope. He wrote his major novel, Argenis, in Rome and, according to his contemporaries, indulged in gardening. He was a member of several learned and literary societies in Rome, including the Accademia dei Lincei. His wife outlived him and died in 1652. One son became bishop of Toul in France and survived until 1673.

== Works ==
In 1609 Barclay edited the De Potestate Papae, an anti-papal treatise by his father, who had died in the preceding year. In 1611 he issued an Apologia or "third part" of the Satyricon, in answer to the attacks of the Jesuits. A so-called "fourth part," with the title of Icon Animorum, describing the character and manners of the European nations, appeared in 1614.

He appears to have been on better terms with the Church and notably with Robert Bellarmine, for in 1617 he issued, from a press at Rome, a Paraenesis ad Sectarios, an attack on the position of Protestantism. Later editions were published in Cologne. The literary effort of his closing years was his best-known work the Argenis, a political romance, resembling in certain respects the Arcadia of Philip Sidney, and the Utopia of Thomas More. The book was completed about a fortnight before his death, which has been said to have been hastened by poison.

Richard Crashaw's poem, "Description of a Religious House and Condition of Life", beginning, "No roofs of gold o'er riotous tables shining,/Whole days and suns devour'd with endless dining;" was translated "Out of Barclay."
