= Manuel Álvares da Costa =

D. Manuel Álvares da Costa
- Bishop of Angra
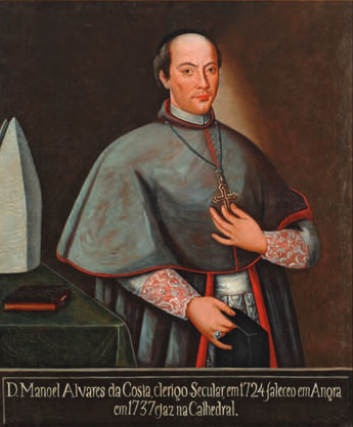
- Church: Sé Cathedral of Angra
- Province: São João Evangalista
- Diocese: Angra
- Appointed: 20 January 1721
- Installed: 30 March 1721
- Term ended: 1733
- Predecessor: João de Brito e Vasconcelos
- Successor: Valério do Sacramento, O.F.M.

Personal details
- Born: 24 August 1651 Lisbon
- Died: 10 January 1733 (aged 81) Angra

D. Manuel Álvares da Costa (24 August 1651 – 10 January 1733), also known as Manuel Álvares da Costa Claumann, was the 5th Bishop of the Diocese of Olinda, in Pernambuco (today the Roman Catholic Archdiocese of Olinda e Recife), from 1706 to 1721, and 19th Bishop of the Diocese of Angra in the Azores, from 1721 to 1733. He governed Pernambuco from 1709 to 1711, during the War of the Mascates.

== Biography ==
D. Manuel Álvares da Costa was ordained on 26 July 1674, beginning an ecclesiastic career that took him to the priory of Santa Justa, the vicar-general of the Archbishopric of Lisbon (1705) and judge of Lisbon Ecclesiastical courts.

=== Diocese of Olinda ===
Álcares da Costa was nominated to be the fifth Bishop of Olinda in 1705, a position he would serve until 1720.

He became the Bishop of the Diocese of Olinda on 7 June 1706 (confirmed on 27 February 1707 by the apostolic nuncio in Lisbon, Michelangelo de Conti, the future Pope Innocent XIII) and left shortly after for Brazil.

During his tenure in Olinda he was instrumental in the events associated with the Mascate War, a conflict between mercantile groups in Olinda and Recife. He took over the governorship of the Captaincy of Pernambuco in 1709, following Sebastião de Castro Caldas Barbosa being removed to Bahia for the invasions and revolts that occurred during the War. He remained governor until 1711, when he was succeeded by Felix José de Mendonça.

He was exiled, but returned in July 1714, and celebrated with the performance of a Presepe, in his honor. In 1718, he founded Freguesia de São Bento (Parish of Saint Benedict) in Maragogi.

=== Diocese of Angra ===
On 20 January 1721, he was presented as the Bishop of the Diocese of Angra. Although it is unclear when he arrived in Angra, in his letter of introduction to the canon (dated 30 March 1721), he gave power of authority to deacon Francisco da Fonseca Carvão, who nominated an ecclesiastical governor. His pastoral actions in the Azores began with visits to the parishes on the island of Terceira, in 1722, wherein he criticized the local clergy for their indoctrination on Sundays and holy days. During this tenure he attempted to revitalize the processions around the churches, with the assistance of Confraria do Santíssimo (Confraternity of the Blessed); and was responsible for normalizing the clothing used by clerics, prohibiting hoods and cloaks.

The prelate presented to the Church of Nossa Senhora do Livramento (in 1725) an azulejo panel depicting the life St. Francis of Assisi, that was placed in the main chapel of the church in Angra. The bishop also authorized an inquiry into the life and virtues of Mother Francisca do Livramento, a sister in the Convent of Esperança in Angra.

At the same time he was responsible for creating various parishes and curias, including the ecclesiastical parishes of Nossa Senhora do Livramento in 1728 (then part of the parish of São Roque), Ponta Delgada, and the curia of the parish of São José de Ponta Delgada.

He supervised the start of the construction of the Church of the Miseracordia in 1728.

He served as bishop for the Azores from 1721 to 1733.

=== Later life ===
D. Manuel Álvares da Costa died at the age of 93, on 10 January 1733, and was buried in a solemn ceremony in the Sé Cathedral of Angra, orated by the Florentino friar João da Trindade.
