= Archdiocese of Olinda e Recife =

Catholic ecclesiastical territory

Coordinates: 8.0139°S 34.8491°W

Metropolitan Archdiocese of Olinda e Recife Archidioecesis Metropolitae Olindensis et Recifensis

Catholic
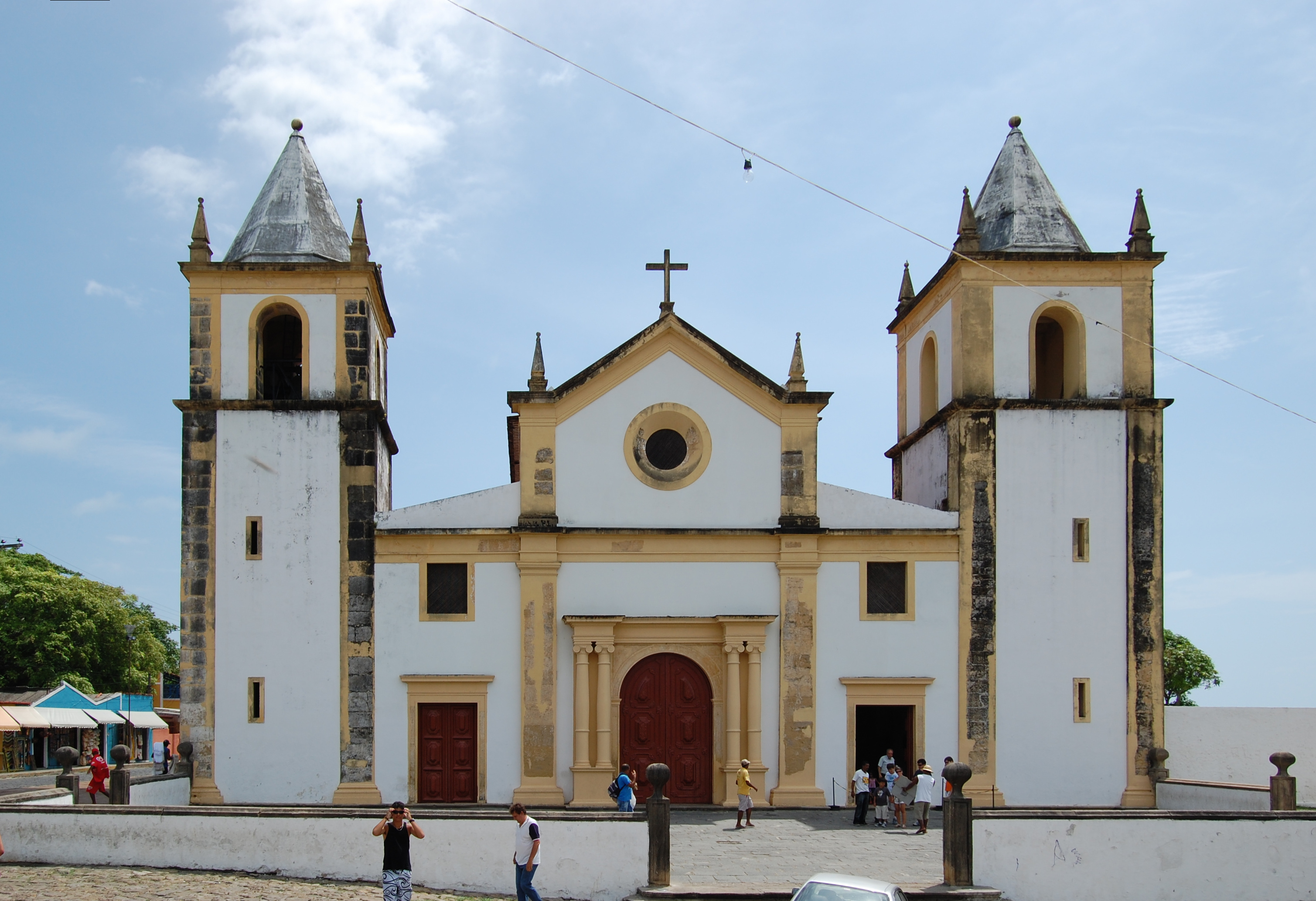
- Metropolitan Cathedral of Holy Saviour of the World

- Coat of arms

Location
- Country: Brazil

Statistics
- Area: 4,305 km^{2} (1,662 sq mi)
- Population: Total; Catholics: (as of 2004); 3,570,703; 3,371,975 (94.4%)

Information
- Rite: Latin Rite
- Established: 15 July 1614 (412 years ago)
- Cathedral: Catedral Metropolitana São Salvador do Mundo, Olinda
- Co-cathedral: Co-Catedral San Pedro dos Clerigos, Recife

Current leadership
- Pope: Leo XIV
- Metropolitan Archbishop: Paulo Jackson Nóbrega de Sousa
- Auxiliary Bishops: Limacêdo Antônio da Silva
- Bishops emeritus: José Cardoso Sobrinho; Antônio Fernando Saburido

Website
- www.arquidioceseolindarecife.org

The Metropolitan Archdiocese of Olinda and Recife (Latin: Archidioecesis Metropolitae Olindensis et Recifensis) is a Latin metropolitan archdiocese in northeast Brazil's Pernambuco state.

== Special churches ==
- Its cathedral archiepiscopal see is a World Heritage Site (Minor): Catedral Metropolitana São Salvador do Mundo, in Olinda
- Its Co-Cathedral is São Pedro dos Clérigos, dedicated to Saint Peter of Clerics, in Recife
- Further it has Minor Basilicas :
  - Basílica Abacial do Mosteiro de São Bento de Olinda, in Olinda
  - Basílica de Nossa Senhora do Carmo, in Recife
  - Basílica Nossa Senhora de Penha, Pernambuco
  - Basílica Sagrado Coração de Jesus, Recife
  - Basílica Santuário de Nossa Senhora Auxiliadora, in Jaboatão dos Guararapes
- Historic churches
  - Capela Dourada, Recife
  - Igreja de Nossa Senhora da Conceição dos Militares, Recife
  - Igreja dos Santos Cosme e Damião, Igarassu
  - Igreja e Convento de Santo Antônio, Igarassu

== History ==
- Established on 17 July 1614 as Territorial Prelature of Pernambuco, on territory split off from the then Diocese of São Salvador da Bahia de Todos os Santos
- Promoted on 11 November 1676 and renamed after its see as Diocese of Olinda

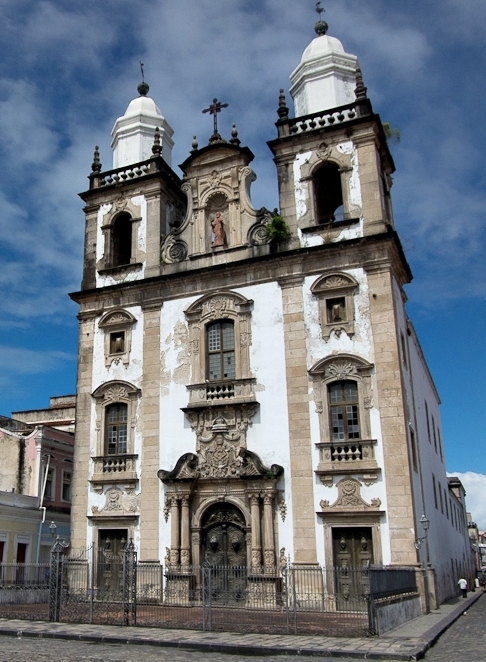
Co-Cathedral of Recife

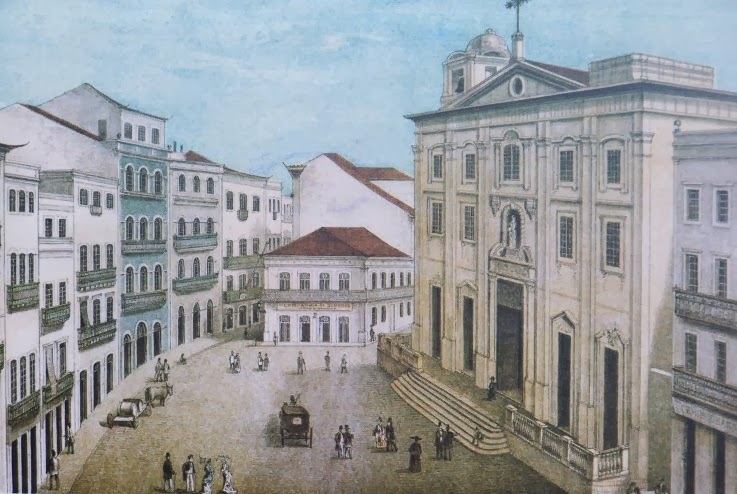
Igreja do Corpo Santo, Recife (demolished)

- Lost territories repeatedly: on 1677.08.30 to establish Diocese of São Luís do Maranhão, on 1854.06.06 to establish Diocese of Ceará, on 1892.04.27 to establish Diocese of Paraiba and on 1900.07.02 to establish Diocese of Alagôas
- Promoted on 5 December 1910 as Metropolitan Archdiocese of Olinda, having lost territory to establish the Diocese of Floresta, its suffragan
- Renamed on 26 July 1918 as Metropolitan Archdiocese of Olinda e Recife, reflecting its double see
- Lost territories repeatedly again : on 1918.08.02 to establish Diocese of Garanhuns and Diocese of Nazaré, on 1948.08.07 to establish Diocese of Caruaru, and on 1962.01.13 to establish Diocese of Palmares.

== Ecclesiastical province ==
Its Suffragan sees are :

- Roman Catholic Diocese of Afogados da Ingazeira
- Roman Catholic Diocese of Caruaru
- Roman Catholic Diocese of Floresta, a daughter
- Roman Catholic Diocese of Garanhuns, a daughter
- Roman Catholic Diocese of Nazaré, a daughter
- Roman Catholic Diocese of Palmares, its junior daughter
- Roman Catholic Diocese of Pesqueira
- Roman Catholic Diocese of Petrolina
- Roman Catholic Diocese of Salgueiro

== Statistics ==
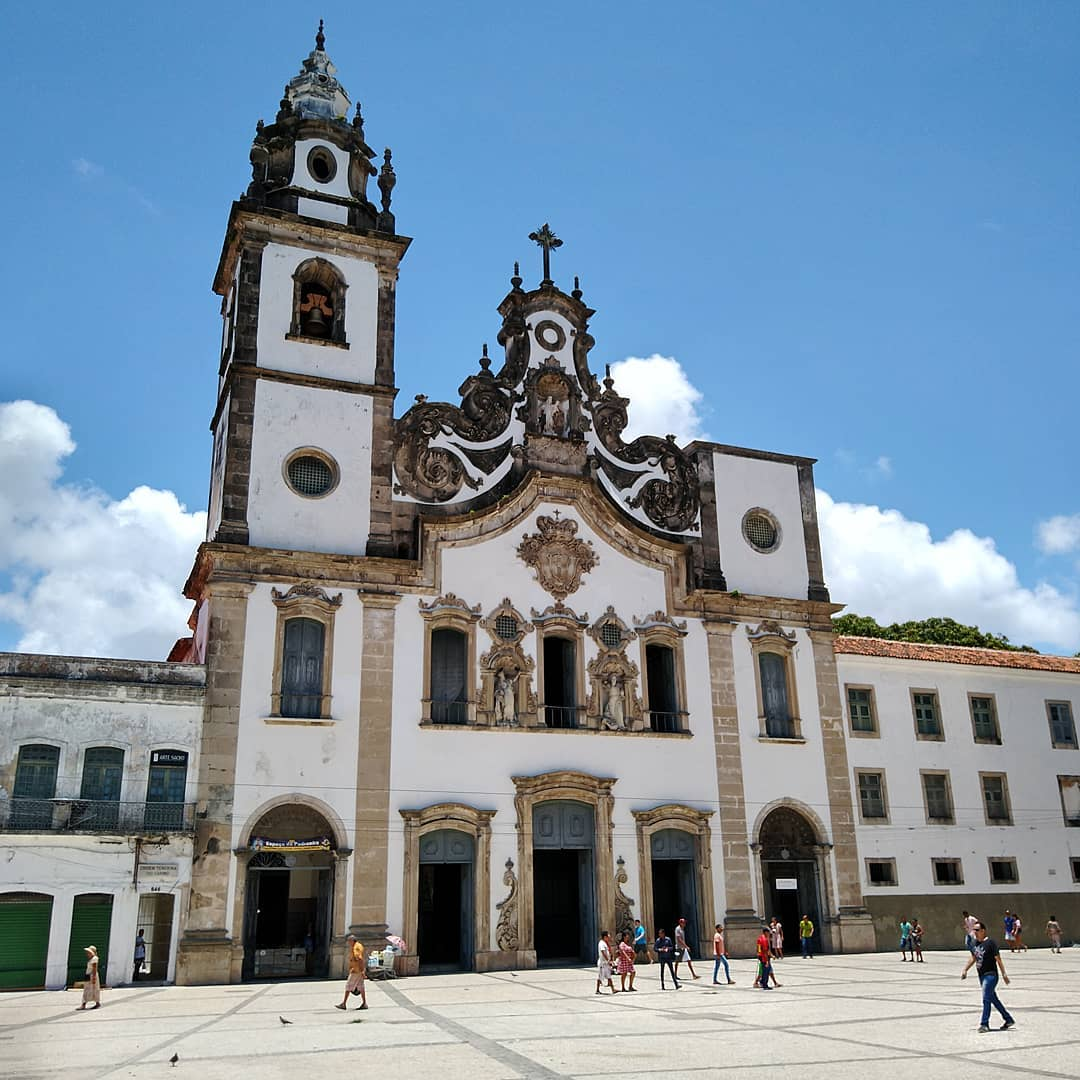
Basílica e Convento de Nossa Senhora do Carmo, Recife

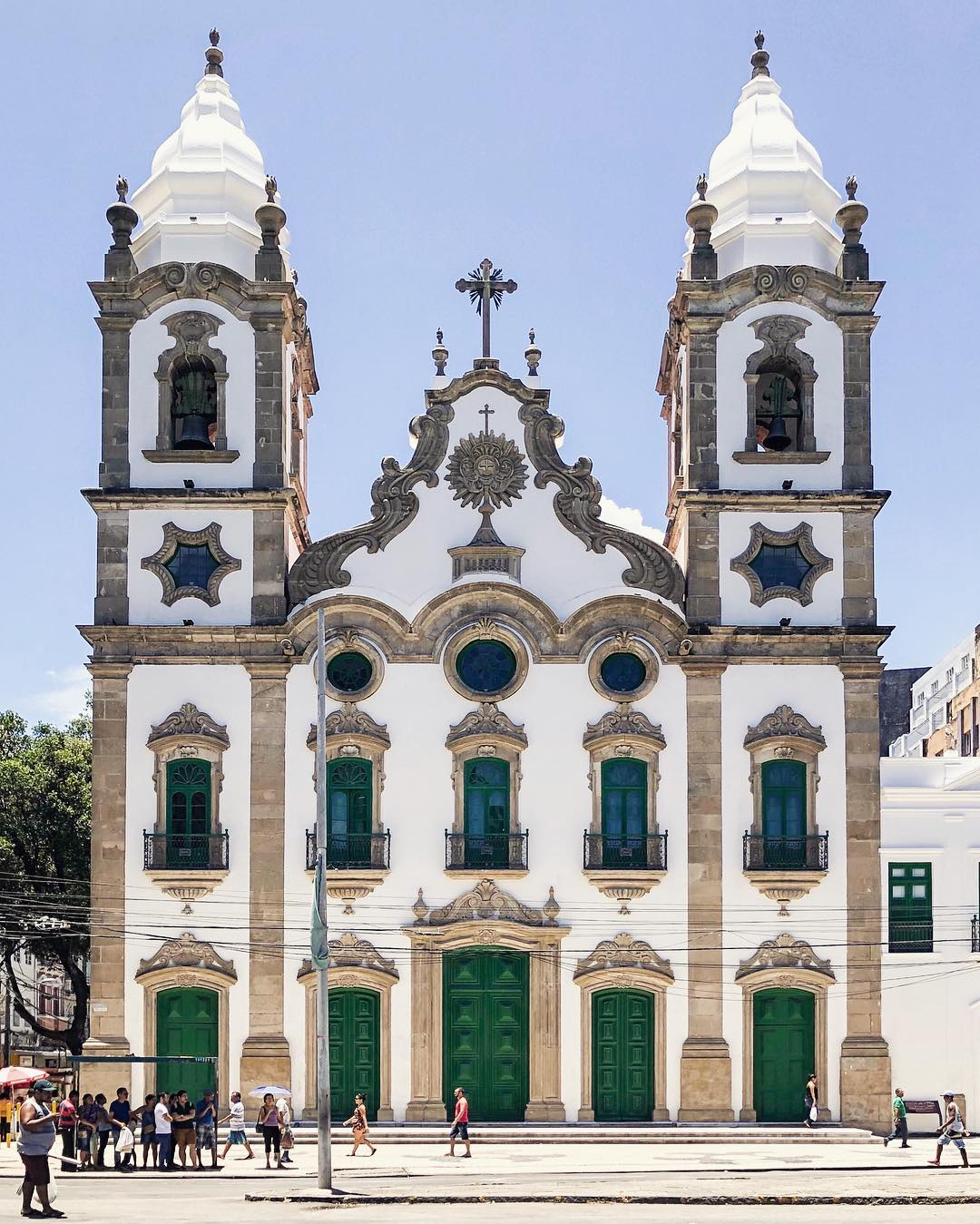
Igreja Matriz do Santíssimo Sacramento de Santo Antônio, Recife

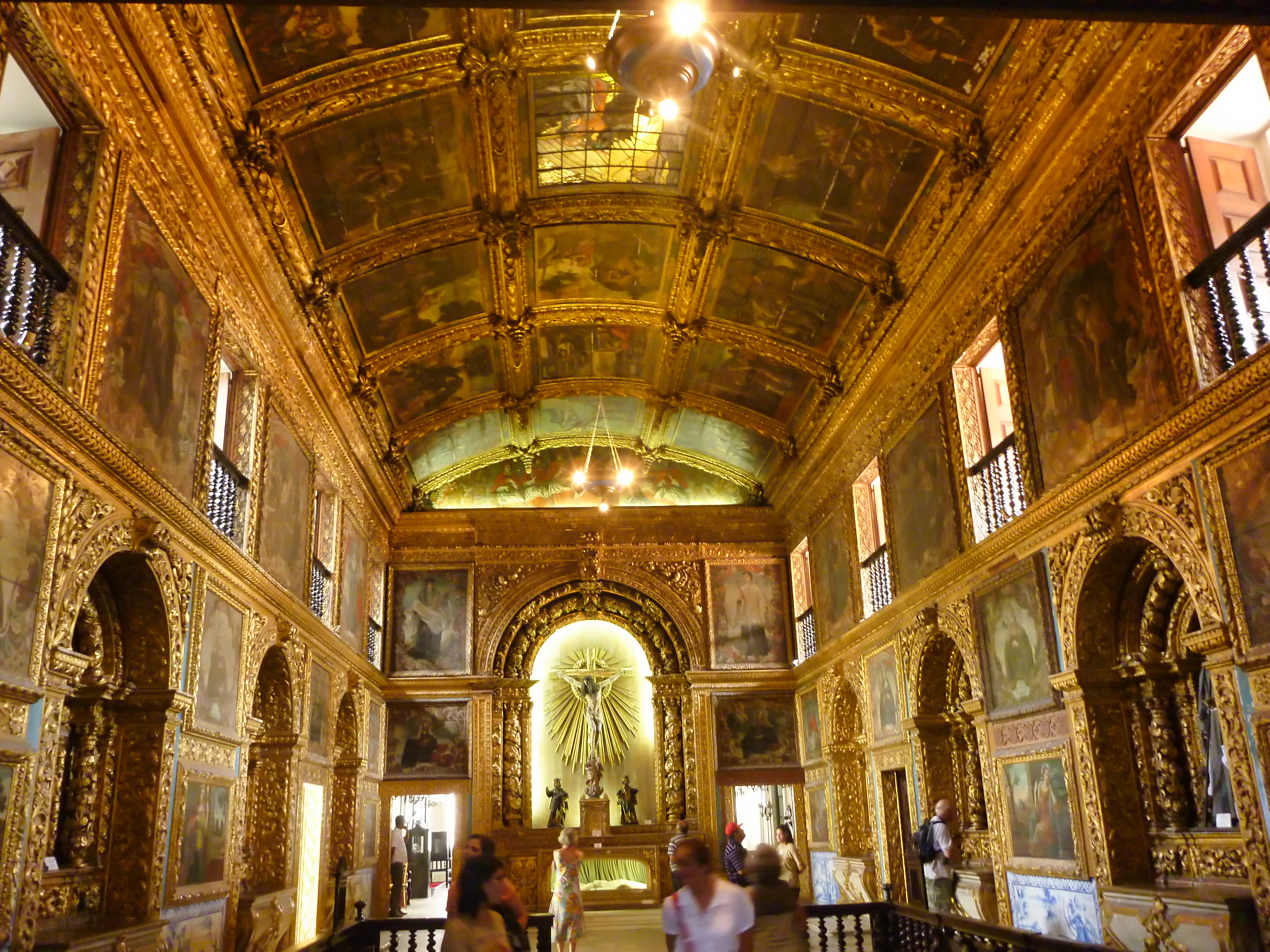
Capela Dourada, Recife

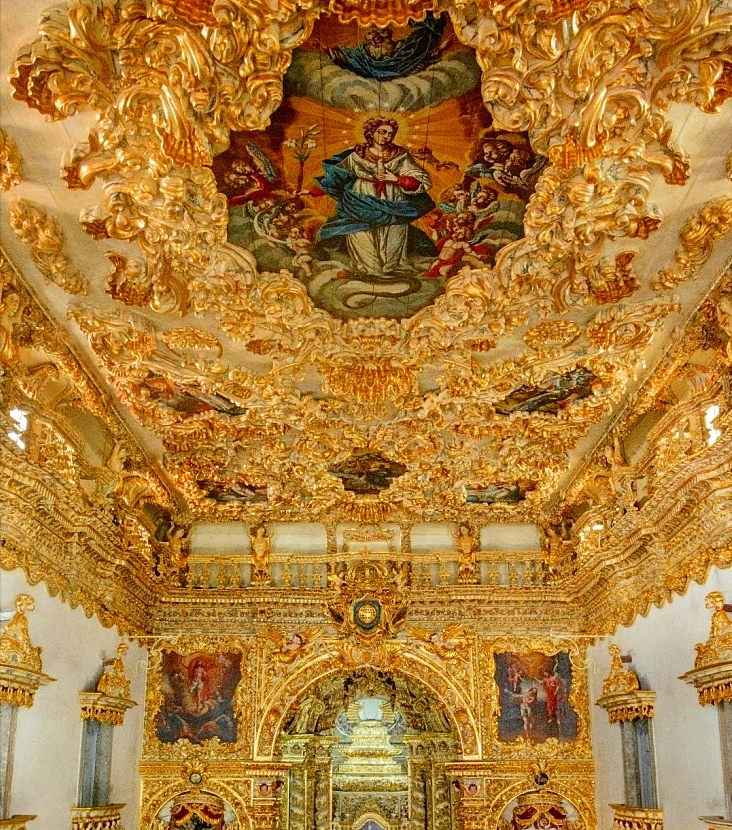
Igreja de Nossa Senhora da Conceição dos Militares, Recife

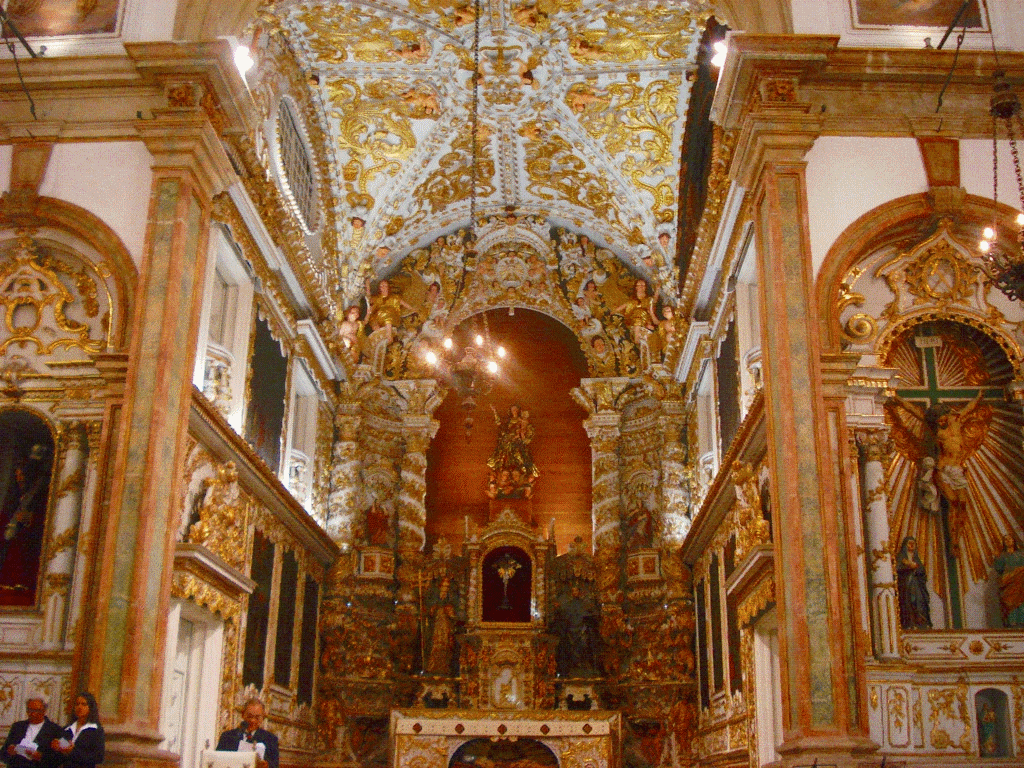
Igreja Madre de Deus, Recife

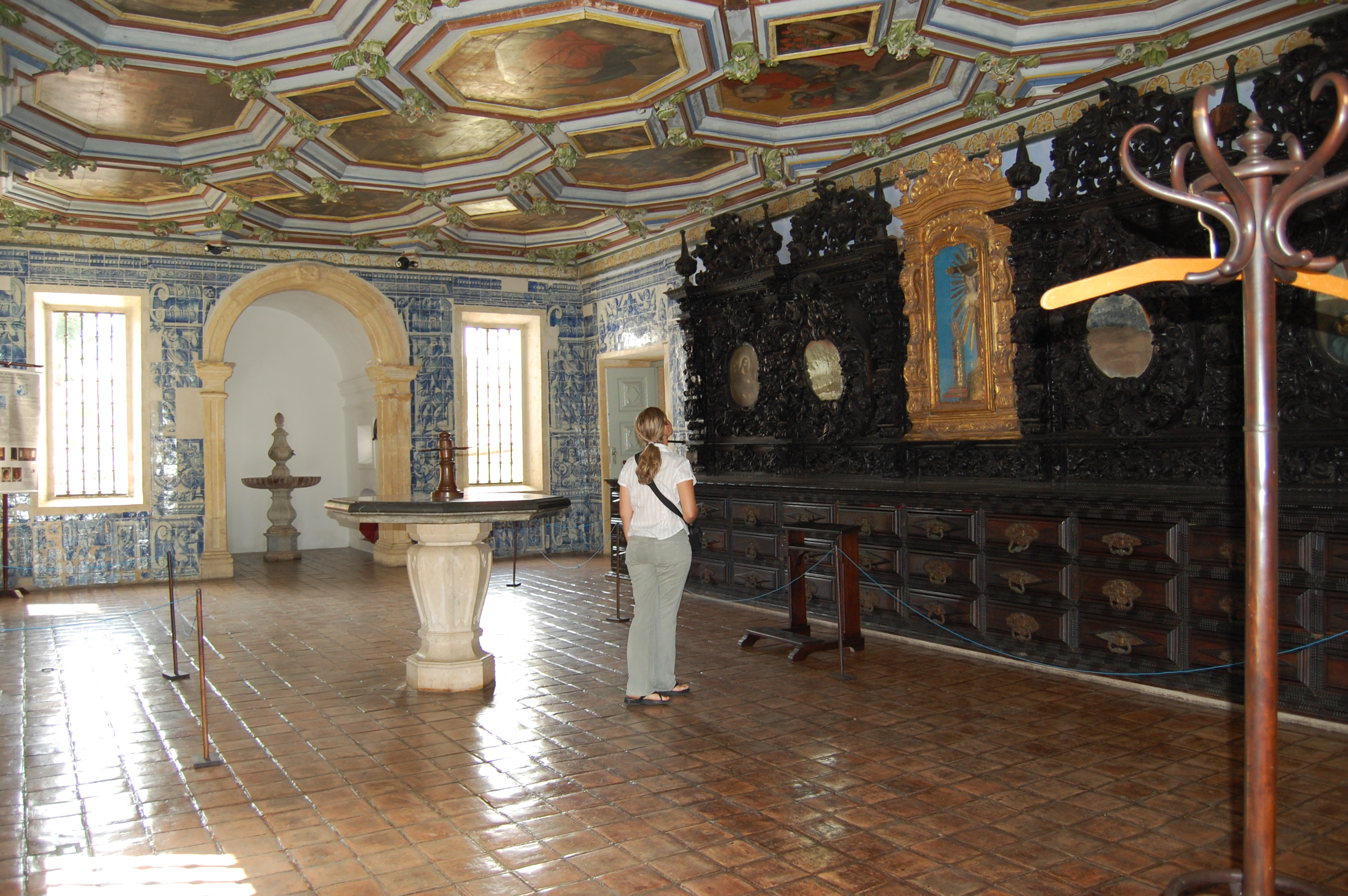
Convento de São Francisco, Olinda

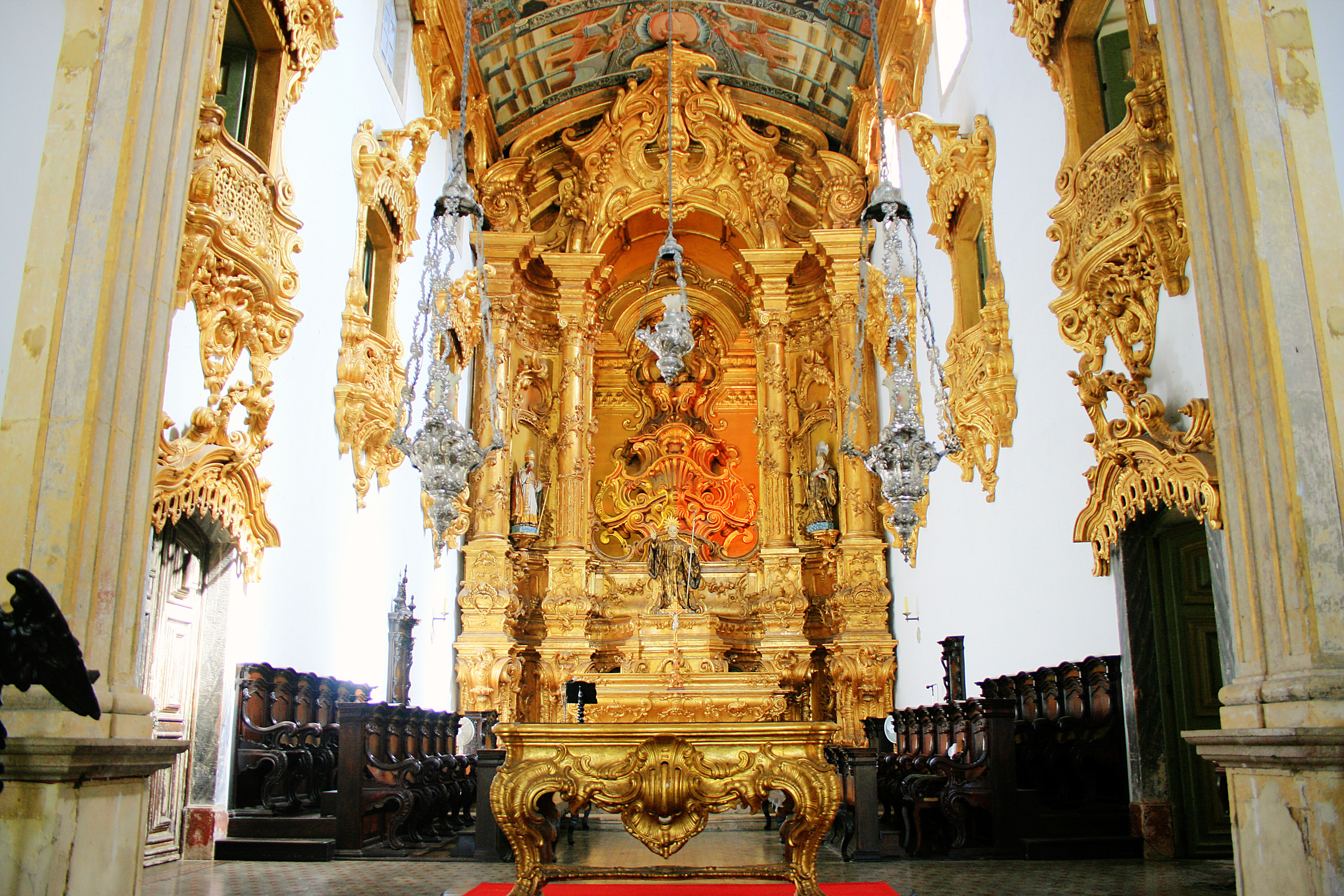
Basílica e Mosteiro de São Bento, Olinda

As per 2014, it pastorally served 3,804,000 Catholics (94.5% of 4,024,000 total) on 4,058 km² in 114 parishes and 689 missions with 277 priests (122 diocesan, 155 religious), 32 deacons, 1,143 lay religious (251 brothers, 892 sisters) with 63 seminarians.

== Bishops ==
(all Roman Rite)

=== Episcopal ordinaries ===
Suffragan Bishops of Olinda

- Estevão Brioso de Figueiredo (born Portugal) (16 Nov 1676 - 27 Sep 1683), next Bishop of Funchal (Madeira, Portugal (27 Sep 1683 – death 1689.05.20)
- João Duarte do Sacramento not possessed (1685 - death 1685)
- Matias de Figueiredo e Mello (12 May 1687 - death 18 July 1694 )
- Francisco de Lima (Lemos) (born Portugal) (22 August 1695 - death 29 April 1704), previously Bishop of São Luís do Maranhão (Brazil) (1691.12.19 – 22 August 1695)
- Manuel Álvares da Costa (born Portugal) (7 June 1706 - 20 Jan 1721), next Bishop of Angra (Portugal) (1721.01.20 – death 1733.01.10)
- José de Fialho (born Portugal) (21 Feb 1725 - 3 Sep 1738), next Metropolitan Archbishop of (São Salvador da) Bahia (Brazil) (1738.09.03 – 1741.01.02), Archbishop-Bishop of Guarda (Portugal) (1741.01.02 – 1741.03.18)
- Luiz de Santa Teresa da Cruz Salgado de Castilho (born Portugal) (3 Sep 1738 - death 17 Nov 1757)
- Francisco Xavier Aranha (17 Nov 1757 - death 5 Oct 1771), previously Titular Bishop of Thermopylæ (1754.02.11 – 1757.11.17) as Coadjutor Bishop of Olinda (1754.02.11 – 1757.11.17)
- Francisco da Assumpção e Brito (born Portugal) (8 March 1773 - 20 Dec 1773), next Metropolitan Archbishop of Goa (then Portuguese India) (1773.12.20 – retired 1783.06.23), died 1808
- Tomaz da Encarnação da Costa e Lima (18 April 1774 - died 14 Jan 1784)
- Diego de Jesus Jardim (14 Feb 1785 - 21 Feb 1794), next Bishop of Elvas (Portugal) (1794.02.21 – death 1796.05.30)
- José Joaquim da Cunha Azeredo Coutinho (12 Sep 1794 - 6 Oct 1806), next Bishop of Elvas (Portugal) (1806.10.06 – death 1821.09.12)
- José Maria de Araújo (born Portugal) (6 Oct 1806 - death 21 Sep 1809)
- Antônio de São José Bastos (15 March 1815 - death 19 July 1819)
- ? Tomaz de Noronha e Brito (1828 – 1829) (23 June 1828 - death 6 March 1829)
- ? Tomas Manoel de Noronha e Britto (born Portugal) (23 June 1828 - death 6 March 1829)
- João da Purificação Marques Perdigão (28 Feb 1831 - retired 30 April 1864), previously Bishop of Cochin (India) (1819.12.17 – 1828.06.23); died 1874

BIOS to ELABORATE

- Francisco Cardoso Aires (20 Dec 1867 - 12 May 1870)
- Vital Maria Gonçalves de Oliveira (21 May 1871 - 4 July 1878)
- José Pereira da Silva Barros (7 Jan 1881 - 25 June 1891), appointed Bishop of São Sebastião do Rio de Janeiro
- João Fernando Santiago Esberard (Esberrard) (born Spain) (12 May 1891 - 12 Sep 1893), appointed Archbishop of São Sebastião do Rio de Janeiro
- Manoel dos Santos Pereira (12 Sep 1893 - 25 April 1900 )
- Luís Raimundo da Silva Brito (23 Feb 1901 - 5 Dec 1910 see below)

Metropolitan Archbishops of Olinda

- Luís Raimundo da Silva Brito (see above 5 Dec 1910- 9 Dec 1915)
- Sebastião (Leme) da Silveira Cintra (29 April 1916 - 29 April 1918 see below)

Metropolitan Archbishops of Olinda & Recife

- Sebastião (Leme) da Silveira Cintra (see above 29 April 1918 - 15 March 1921), appointed Coadjutor Archbishop of São Sebastião do Rio de Janeiro; future Cardinal
- Miguel de Lima Valverde † (10 Feb 1922 - 7 May 1951)
- Antônio de Almeida Moraes Junior † (17 Nov 1951 - 23 April 1960), appointed Archbishop of Niterói, Rio de Janeiro
- Carlos Gouveia Coelho † (23 April 1960 - 7 March 1964 )
- Helder Pessoa Câmara † (12 March 1964 - 2 April 1985), world-famous liberation theology icon
- José Cardoso Sobrinho (2 April 1985 - 16 August 2009)
- Antônio Fernando Saburido (16 August 2009 - 14 June 2023).
- Paulo Jackson Nóbrega de Sousa (14 June 2023 - ...)

=== Coadjutor bishops ===
- Coadjutor Bishop: Francisco Xavier Aranha (1754.02.11 – 1757.11.17)
- Coadjutor Bishop: João Fernando Santiago Esberard (Esberrard) (1890.06.26 – 1891.05.12); future Archbishop
- Coadjutor Archbishop: João Irineu Joffily (1914.08.18 – 1916.05.04), did not succeed to see; appointed Bishop of Amazonas
- Coadjutor Archbishop: João Batista Portocarrero Costa (1953.07.03 – 1959.01.06), did not succeed to see

=== Auxiliary bishops ===
- Auxiliary Bishop: José Lamartine Soares (1962.11.16 – 1985.04.02), appointed Archbishop of Maceió, Alagoas
- Auxiliary Bishop: Hilário Moser, S.D.B. (1988.08.17 – 1992.05.27), appointed Bishop of Tubarão, Santa Catarina
- Auxiliary Bishop: João Evangelista Martins Terra, S.J. (1988.08.17 – 1994.06.15), appointed Auxiliary Bishop of Brasília, Distrito Federal
- Auxiliary Bishop: Bishop Fernando Antônio Saburido, O.S.B. (2000.05.31 – 2005.05.18), appointed Bishop of Sobral, Ceara (later returned here as Archbishop)

=== Other priests of this diocese who became bishops ===
- Jerónimo Thomé da Silva, appointed Bishop of Belém do Pará in 1890
- Francisco do Rêgo Maia, appointed Bishop of Niterói (Nictheroy) in 1893
- Augusto Álvaro da Silva, appointed Bishop of Floresta in 1912; future Cardinal
- Ricardo Ramos de Castro Vilela, appointed Bishop of Nazaré, Pernambuco in 1919
- João Tavares de Moura, appointed Bishop of Garanhuns, Pernambuco in 1919
- José Pereira Alves, appointed Bishop of Natal in 1922

== See also ==
- List of Catholic dioceses in Brazil

== Sources and external links ==
- GCatholic.org, with Google map and satellite photo - data for all sections
- Catholic Hierarchy
- Archdiocese website (Portuguese)
