= Hélder Câmara =

Brazilian Catholic archbishop and socialist (1909–1999)

Servant of God Hélder Câmara OFS
- Archbishop-Emeritus of Olinda e Recife
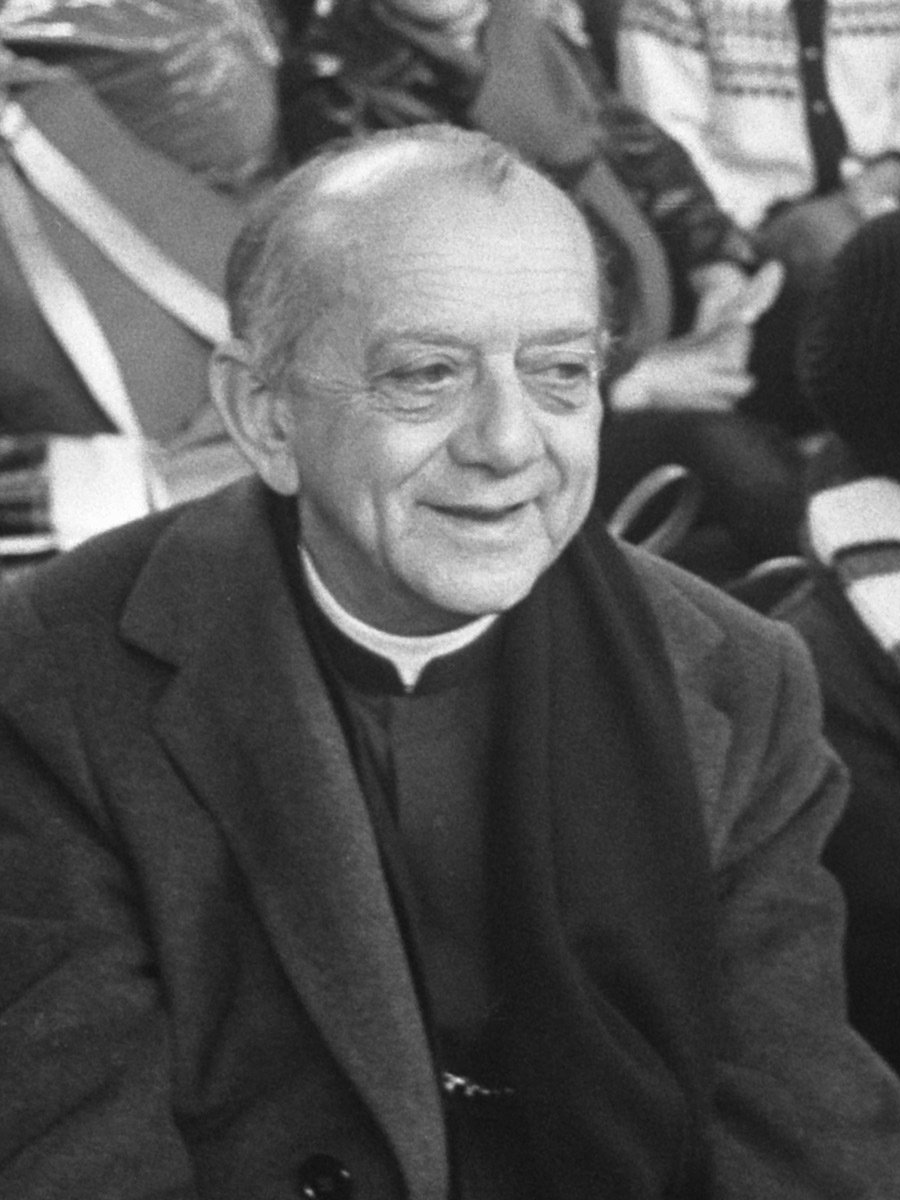
- Camara in 1974
- Church: Latin Church
- See: Olinda e Recife (Emeritus)
- Installed: 12 March 1964
- Term ended: 2 April 1985
- Predecessor: Carlos Gouveia Coelho
- Successor: José Cardoso Sobrinho

Orders
- Ordination: 1931
- Consecration: 20 April 1952 by Jaime de Barros Câmara

Personal details
- Born: Hélder Pessoa Câmara; 7 February 1909 Fortaleza, Brazil
- Died: 27 August 1999 (aged 90) Recife, Brazil
- Buried: Holy Saviour of the World Cathedral, Olinda
- Denomination: Roman Catholic Church
- Occupation: Catholic prelate
- Motto: In manus tuas ('Into your hands')
- Coat of arms

Hélder Pessoa Câmara (Note: Brazilian Portuguese: [ˈɛwdeʁ peˈsoɐ ˈkɐ̃mɐɾɐ].) OFS (7 February 1909 – 27 August 1999) was a Brazilian Catholic prelate who served as Archbishop of Olinda and Recife from 1964 to 1985. He was declared a Servant of God in 2015.

A self-identified socialist, Câmara was an advocate of liberation theology. He did social and political work for the poor and for human rights and democracy during the military regime. Câmara preached for a church closer to the disfavoured people. He is quoted as having said, "When I give food to the poor, they call me a saint. When I ask why they are poor, they call me a communist."

== Early life and education ==
Hélder Pessoa Câmara was born on 7 February 1909, in Fortaleza, Ceará, in the poor Northeast Region of Brazil. His father was an accountant and his mother was a primary school teacher. He was educated in local Catholic schools and entered seminary in 1923.

== Career ==
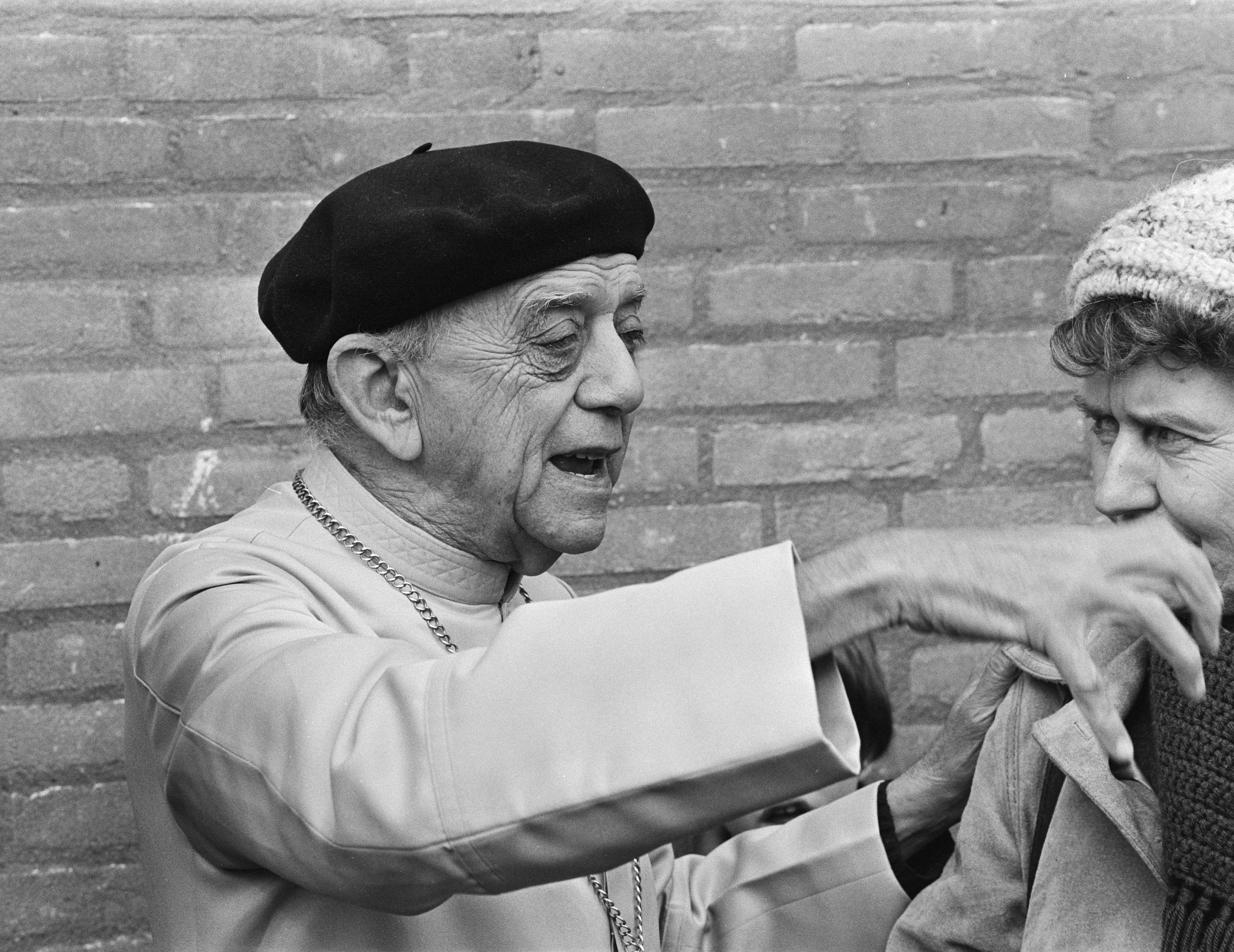
Câmara in 1984

He was ordained a priest in 1931 at the age of 22, with a dispensation from the Holy See since he was below the canonical age of 24. Câmara was named auxiliary bishop of Rio de Janeiro by Pope Pius XII on 3 March 1952. During his first years as a priest he was a supporter of the far-right Brazilian Integralist Action (Ação Integralista Brasileira, AIB), an ideological choice that he later rejected. He also founded two social organizations: the Ceará Legion of Work, in 1931, and the Women Workers' Catholic Union, in 1933.

He was active in the formation of the Brazilian Bishops' Conference (CNBB) in 1952, and served as its first general secretary until 1964. In that role, he founded Caritas Brazil in 1956. In 1959, he founded Banco da Providência in Rio de Janeiro, a philanthropic organization to fight poverty and social injustice by facilitating the contraction of loans by poorer populations.

On 12 March 1964, Pope Paul VI appointed him Archbishop of Olinda e Recife. During his tenure, Câmara was informally called the "bishop of the slums" for his clear position on the side of the urban poor. With other clerics, he encouraged peasants to free themselves from their conventional fatalistic outlook by studying the gospels in small groups and proposing the search for social change from their readings.

He attended all four sessions of the Second Vatican Council and played a significant role in drafting Gaudium et spes. On 16 November 1965, a few days before the council ended, 40 bishops led by Câmara met at night in the Catacombs of Domitilla outside Rome. They celebrated the Eucharist and signed a document under the title of the Pact of the Catacombs. In 13 points, they challenged their brother bishops to live lives of evangelical poverty: without honorific titles, privileges, and worldly ostentation. They taught that "the collegiality of the bishops finds its supreme evangelical realization in jointly serving the two-thirds of humanity who live in physical, cultural, and moral misery". They called for openness "to all, no matter what their beliefs".

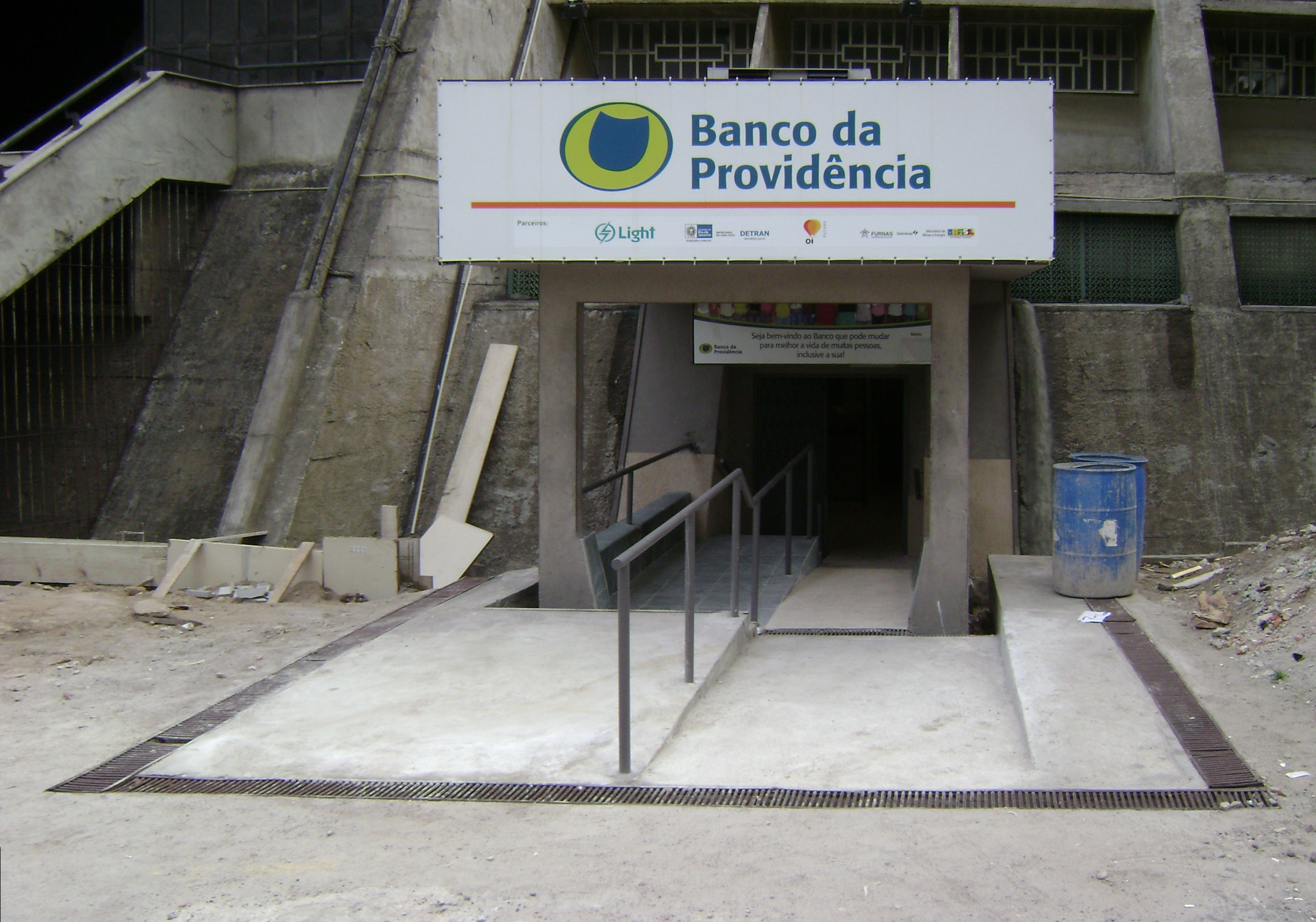
Entrance to the branch of the Banco da Providência located in the Rio de Janeiro Cathedral

Under the guidance of Câmara, the Catholic Church in Brazil became an outspoken critic of the 1964–1985 military dictatorship, and a powerful movement for social change. Câmara spoke out and wrote about the implications of using violence to repress rebellion resulting from poverty and injustice in other venues than Brazil. Traditionalist Catholics urged the military government to arrest Câmara for his support of land reform and Câmara's colleague, Father Antônio Henrique Pereira Neto, was murdered by unknown conservative forces.

A proponent of liberation theology, he was Archbishop of the Diocese of Olinda and Recife from 1964 to 1985, the entirety of the dictatorship. Liberation theology brought forth the political aspect of the Church's charitable work and was criticized on the grounds that it was encouraging the armed revolutionary struggles that swept Latin America during the 1970s and 1980s.

Câmara published Spiral of Violence in 1971, a short tract written when the United States was immersed in a still escalating Vietnam War. It is distinctive for linking structural injustice (Level 1 violence) with escalating rebellion (Level 2 violence) and repressive reaction (Level 3 violence). In it, Câmara called on the youth of the world to take steps to break the spiral, saying their elders became addicted to those escalating steps.

Câmara died in Recife on 27 August 1999, aged 90.

== Views ==
Câmara endorsed the position of the Orthodox Church that spouses who were abandoned should be allowed to remarry within the church. He also admitted women's ordination. He criticized Pope Paul VI's removal of artificial contraception from the purview of the Second Vatican Council as "a mistake" meant to "torture spouses, to disturb peace of many homes", "a new condemnation of Galileo", "the death of the Council" and "the practical denial of collegiality". According to the former Vatican's Secretariat of State, however, Câmara went on to send a telegram to the Vatican praising the encyclical Humanae Vitae.

In his famous interview with Italian journalist Oriana Fallaci, he also stated that, despite his support for non-violence, he did not condemn violent tactics: "And I respect a lot priests with rifles on their shoulders; I never said that to use weapons against an oppressor is immoral or anti-Christian. But that's not my choice, not my road, not my way to apply the Gospels".

Câmara identified himself as a socialist and not as a Marxist, but while disagreeing with Marxism, had Marxist sympathies. In the Fallaci interview, he stated, "My socialism is special, it's a socialism that respects the human person and goes back to the Gospels. My socialism is justice." He said, concerning Marx, that while he disagreed with his conclusions, he agreed with his analysis of the capitalist society.

He never denied his communist sympathies and he openly supported dialogue with communists. He believed in the Fátima apparitions but he interpreted its call for the "conversion of Russia" as meaning that the Soviet Union would abandon its anti-religious policies but will not be rejecting communism. He wrote: "And what was the appeal of Fatima for? ... Not for the annihilation of the USSR and China, but for their conversion ... In 1967, the Russian Revolution will celebrate its jubilee ... We must accelerate the pace, there is no more time to waste". In a poem dedicated to French Dominican priest Louis-Joseph Lebret, Câmara states his belief that Karl Marx is in Heaven, and has him decorating Lebret of behalf of Jesus Christ: "Who decorated you / in the name of Christ / It was Karl Marx, / taken to heaven / for criticizing capital / and for the protection of workers?! ... / And the lack of understanding regarding faith?/ It was the Christians' fault / that he found around and gave him wrong vision / of Christ and Christianity?"

== Legacy and honors ==
- In 1973, Câmara was nominated for the Nobel Peace Prize by the American Friends Service Committee (AFSC). His candidacy was however undermined by two conservative members (Sjur Lindebrække and Bernt Ingvaldsen) of the Norwegian Nobel Committee, who cooperated with the Brazilian ambassador in Oslo as the military dictatorship in Brazil was vehemently against him receiving the Nobel peace prize.
- In 1975, he was awarded the Pacem in Terris Award, initiated by the Catholic Interracial Council of the Diocese of Davenport, Iowa. It was named after a 1963 encyclical letter by Pope John XXIII that calls upon all people of good will to secure peace among all nations. Pacem in terris is Latin for "Peace on Earth".

== Beatification process ==
On 15 February 2015, the Archbishop of Olinda and Recife, Antônio Fernando Saburido announced that he was sending a letter to the Holy See requesting the opening of the process of beatification of Câmara. Less than ten days later, the assent was given by the Congregation for the Causes of the Saints, meaning that Câmara was given the title of a Servant of God on 7 April 2015. The opening of the beatification process took place on 3 May that year in Olinda Cathedral. This marked the beginning of the diocesan phase of the beatification process.

== See also ==
- List of peace activists
- Streetwise priest

== Notes ==
Catholic Church titles
Preceded by Carlos Gouveia Coelho	Archbishop of Olinda e Recife; 1964–1985	Succeeded by José Cardoso Sobrinho
