= Diocese of Caruaru =

Catholic ecclesiastical territory

Coordinates: 8.2855°S 35.9709°W

Diocese of Caruaru Dioecesis Caruaruensis

Catholic
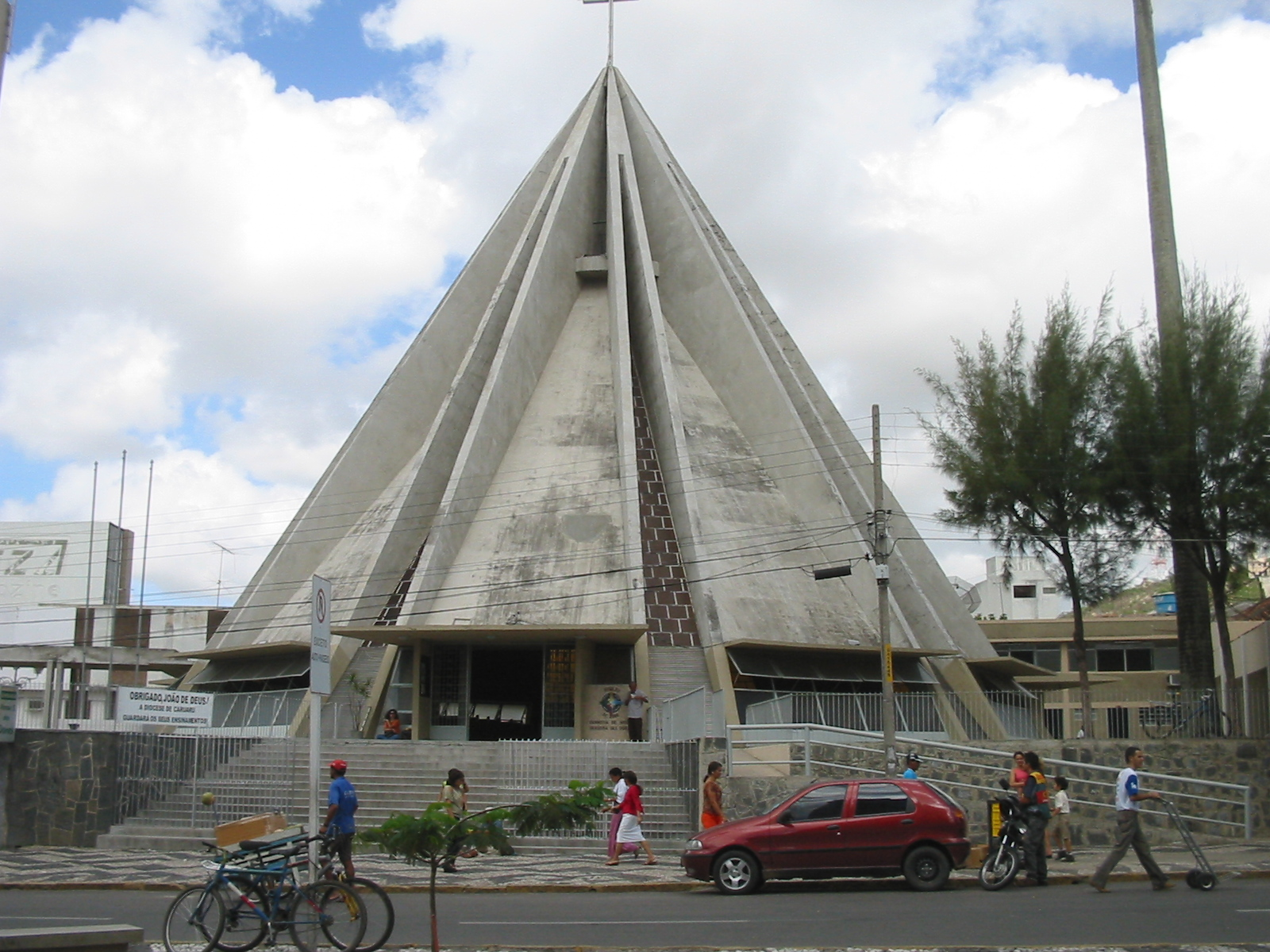
- Cathedral of Our Lady of the Dolors

- Coat of arms

Location
- Country: Brazil
- Ecclesiastical province: Olinda e Recife

Statistics
- Area: 5,687 km^{2} (2,196 sq mi)
- Population: Total; Catholics: (as of 2004); 724,794; 610,281 (84.2%)

Information
- Rite: Latin Rite
- Established: 7 August 1948 (78 years ago)
- Cathedral: Catedral Nossa Senhora das Dores

Current leadership
- Pope: Leo XIV
- Bishop: José Ruy Gonçalves Lopes, OFMCap
- Metropolitan Archbishop: Fernando Antônio Saburido, OSB
- Bishops emeritus: Bernardino Marchió

Website
- diocesedecaruaru.com.br

The Roman Catholic Diocese of Caruaru (Latin: Dioecesis Caruaruensis) is located in the ecclesiastical province of Olinda e Recife in Brazil.

On August 7, 1948, it was established as Diocese of Caruaru from the Metropolitan Archdiocese of Olinda e Recife.

== Leadership ==
- Bishops of Caruaru (Roman rite), in reverse chronological order
  - Bishop José Ruy Gonçalves Lopes, OFMCap (2019.07.10 – present)
  - Bishop Bernardino Marchió (2002.11.06 – 2019.07.10)
  - Bishop Antônio Soares Costa (1993.10.27 – 2002.06.07)
  - Bishop Augusto Carvalho (1959.08.08 – 1993.10.27)
  - Bishop Paulo Hipólito de Souza Libório (1949.03.15 – 1959.06.20)
