= Estevão Brioso de Figueiredo =

Most Reverend Estevão Brioso de Figueiredo
- Bishop of Funchal
- Church: Catholic Church
- Diocese: Diocese of Funchal
- In office: 1683–1689
- Predecessor: António Telles da Silva
- Successor: José Saldanha
- Previous post: Bishop of Olinda (1676–1683)

Orders
- Consecration: 21 Mar 1677 by Luis de Sousa

Personal details
- Born: 1630 Évora, Portugal
- Died: 20 May 1689 (age 59) Funchal, Portugal

Estevão Brioso de Figueiredo (1630–1689) was a Roman Catholic prelate who served as Bishop of Funchal (1683–1689) and the first Bishop of Olinda (1676–1683).

== Biography ==
Estevão Brioso de Figueiredo was born in Évora, Portugal in 1630 and ordained a priest on 15 Jun 1658. On 16 Nov 1676, he was appointed during the papacy of Pope Innocent XI as Bishop of Olinda. On 21 Mar 1677, he was consecrated bishop by Luis de Sousa, Archbishop of Lisbon. On 27 Sep 1683, he was appointed during the papacy of Pope Innocent XI as Bishop of Funchal. He served as Bishop of Funchal until his death on 20 May 1689.

== Episcopal succession ==
While bishop, he was the principal co-consecrator of:

- Gaspar Barata de Mendonça, Archbishop of São Salvador da Bahia (1677); and
- José Antonio de Lencastre, Bishop of Miranda do Douro (1677).

Catholic Church titles
Preceded by None	Bishop of Olinda; 1676–1683	Succeeded by João Duarte do Sacramento
Preceded by António Telles da Silva	Bishop of Funchal; 1683–1689	Succeeded by José Saldanha
