= Church of Nossa Senhora da Conceição dos Militares =

Roman Catholic church in Pernambuco, Brazil

Church of Our Lady of the Conception of the Military
- Igreja de Nossa Senhora da Conceição dos Militares
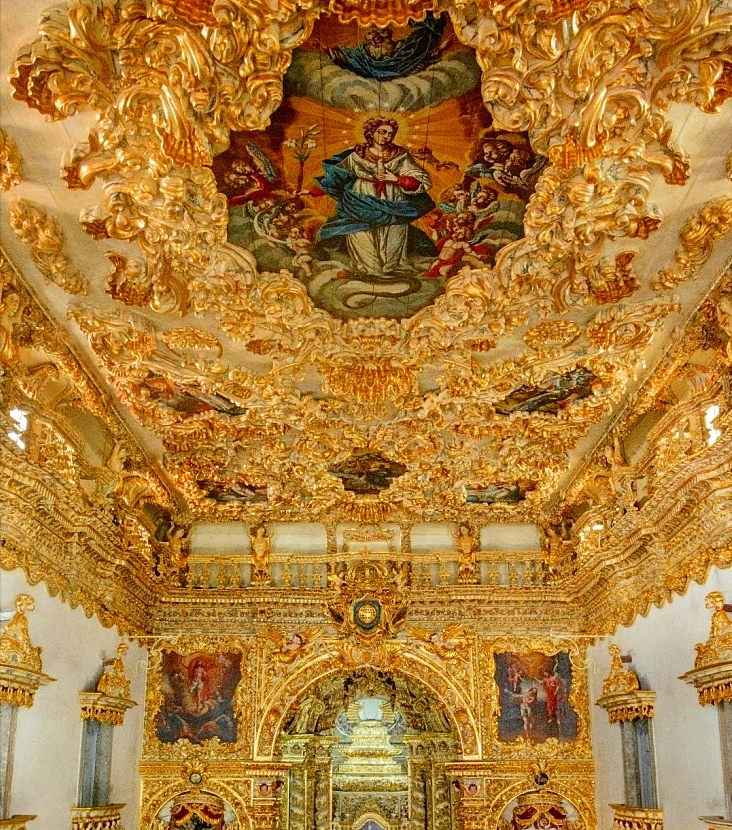
- Interior of Church of Our Lady of the Conception of the Military

- Location of the Church of the Church of Our Lady of the Conception of the Military in Brazil

Religion
- Affiliation: Catholic
- Rite: Roman

Location
- Municipality: Recife
- State: Pernambuco
- Country: Brazil
- Interactive map of Church of Our Lady of the Conception of the Military
- Administration: Roman Catholic Archdiocese of Olinda e Recife
- Coordinates: 8.064241°S 34.880119°W

Architecture
- Style: Baroque, Rococo
- Completed: 1771

The Church of Our Lady of the Conception of the Military (Portuguese: Igreja de Nossa Senhora da Conceição dos Militares) is an 18th-century Roman Catholic church in Recife, Pernambuco, Brazil. It is located on Rua Nova in the historic center of Recife and is under the administration of the Roman Catholic Archdiocese of Olinda e Recife. The church was listed as a historic structure by the National Historic and Artistic Heritage Institute in 1941.

== History ==
The Recife Infantry Regiment (Terço da Vila de Santo Antônio do Recife), which included officers, sergeants and squares of the Corps of Execution and Cavalry, organized a Brotherhood of Our Lady of the Conception of the Military in the early 18th century. Under the command of João Lobo de Lacerda they requested permission to construct a church dedicated to Our Lady of the Conception on March 19, 1725. Some evidence dates to the beginning of construction of the church to 1710. It was completed in 1771.

Construction of the church was authorized by Antônio Fernandes de Matos. It features a simple, severe façade, in contrast to its richly decorated interior. The structures lacks a churchyard. It is constructed of heavy stonework, a single tower, and Rococo pediment. The interior walls are richly decorated with baroque carving.

The vault of the chancel is notably complex. It consists of a crossed arch with two side altars as typical of the period of King João V. The ceiling of the nave is a style associated with Nicolau Nasoni and André Soares, a sculptor, of northern Portugal. The length of the nave has a carved veranda; it is the only example of this type of construction in Recife. The ceiling of the name is richly painted with themes associated with the life of the Virgin Mary.

The paintings of the church depict elements atypical and possibly prohibited by the Church of the period, including homunculus of Jesus Christ on the breast of the Virgin Mary. A painting depicting the Battle of Guararapes is located in the lower choir. It was commissioned by Governor José César de Meneses, and attributed to João de Deus Sepúlveda. The central painting of the Virgin is attributed to José Rabelo Gonçalves.

The church remains under the management of the Brotherhood of Our Lady of the Conception of the Military.

== Protected status ==
The Church of Our Lady of the Conception of the Military was listed as a historic structure by the National Historic and Artistic Heritage Institute in 1941. The heritage designation includes both the church and the Summer Palace of the Archbishop. The structures were registered under the Book of Historical Works, Inscription 4-T and Book of Fine Arts, Inscription fl 53. Both directives are dated September 25, 1941.

== Access ==
The church is open to the public and may be visited.
