= José Cardoso Sobrinho =

Catholic archbishop

The Most Reverend José Cardoso Sobrinho OCarm
- Archbishop Emeritus of Olinda e Recife
- See: Olinda e Recife
- Installed: 2 March 1985
- Term ended: 1 August 2009
- Predecessor: Hélder Câmara
- Successor: Antônio Fernando Saburido
- Other post: Bishop of Paracatu

Orders
- Ordination: 28 April 1957
- Consecration: 27 May 1979

Personal details
- Born: 30 June 1933 (age 93)
- Denomination: Catholic Church
- Motto: In obsequio Jesu Christi

José Cardoso Sobrinho OCarm (born 30 June 1933, in Caruaru) is the Archbishop Emeritus of the Roman Catholic Archdiocese of Olinda e Recife in the Brazilian state of Pernambuco.

He joined the Order of Our Lady of Mount Carmel in 1957 and was appointed bishop of Paracatu in 1979. Sobrinho is the successor of Hélder Câmara and had been tasked with undoing the influence of liberation theology in that region of Brazil.

== 2009 statement of excommunication ==
In March 2009, after an abortion on a nine-year-old girl raped by her stepfather and pregnant with twins had been performed due to rape exception of Brazil’s abortion laws, Sobrinho stated that automatic excommunication had been incurred by the girl's mother and the medical team. Regarding his statement, he said:

The law of God is higher than any human laws. When a human law—that is, a law enacted by human legislators—is against the law of God, that law has no value. The adults who approved, who carried out this abortion have incurred excommunication.

President Lula da Silva and Health Minister José Gomes Temporão decried his statement. The National Conference of Bishops of Brazil disowned it, saying that the mother was certainly not excommunicated and there was insufficient evidence to show that any member of the medical team was. The statement was also criticized in the Vatican newspaper L'Osservatore Romano by the President of the Pontifical Academy for Life, Cardinal Rino Fisichella. One of the doctors concerned said the controversy had drawn needed attention to Brazil's restrictive abortion laws.

== Retirement ==
Sobrinho's resignation was accepted when he reached the canonical age limit upon turning 75 in 2008. His successor is Antônio Fernando Saburido, previously Bishop of Sobral.
