= Co-Cathedral of Recife =

Co-Cathedral of St. Peter of Clerics
- Co-Catedral São Pedro dos Clérigos
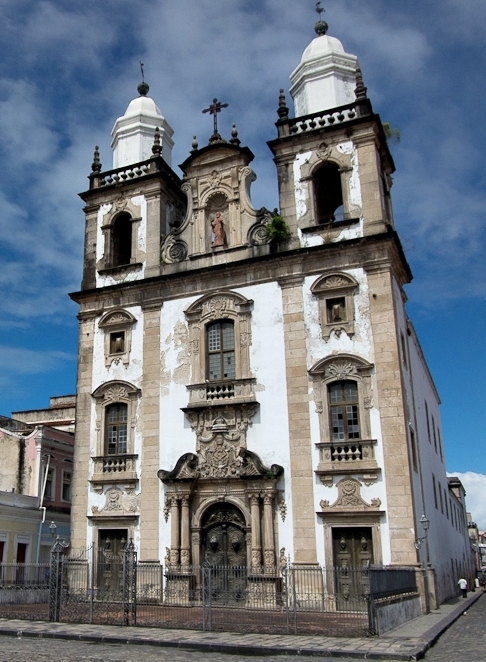
- Co-Cathedral of St. Peter of Clerics
- 8°04′02″S 34°52′45″W
- Location: Recife
- Country: Brazil
- Denomination: Roman Catholic Church

Administration
- Archdiocese: Olinda e Recife

National Historic Heritage of Brazil
- Designated: 1938

The Co-Cathedral of St. Peter of Clerics (Portuguese: Co-Catedral São Pedro dos Clérigos) Also Recife Co-Cathedral It is a Catholic church located in the city of Recife, state of Pernambuco in the South American country of Brazil.

== History and description ==
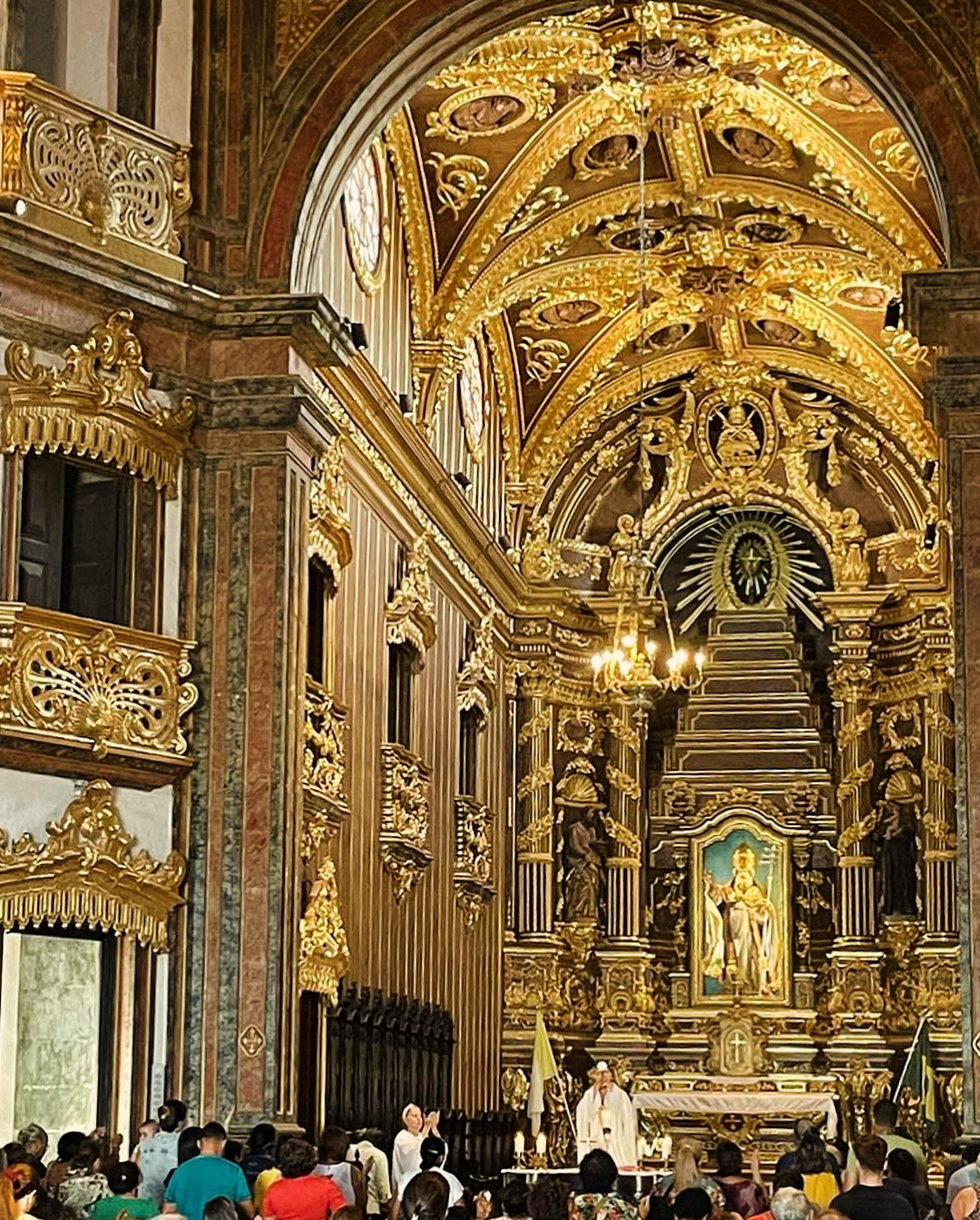
View of the main chapel.

The Brotherhood of St. Peter of Clerics, established on June 26, 1700, bought nearly 20 years later, an orchard and six houses located in the center of Aguas Verdes, in the San Antonio neighborhood of Recife, to the construction of a church of its own. An inscription in the portal of the church informs that the beginning of the construction took place the 3 of May of 1728.

The project was prepared by Manuel Ferreira Jácome. The consistory, the choir and the sacristy were already ready in 1729, but the church body and the central part of the facade were completed in 1759.

== See also ==
- Roman Catholicism in Brazil
- Co-Cathedral
- Colonial architecture of Brazil
