= Convent of Esperança (Angra do Heroísmo) =

- Convento da Esperança
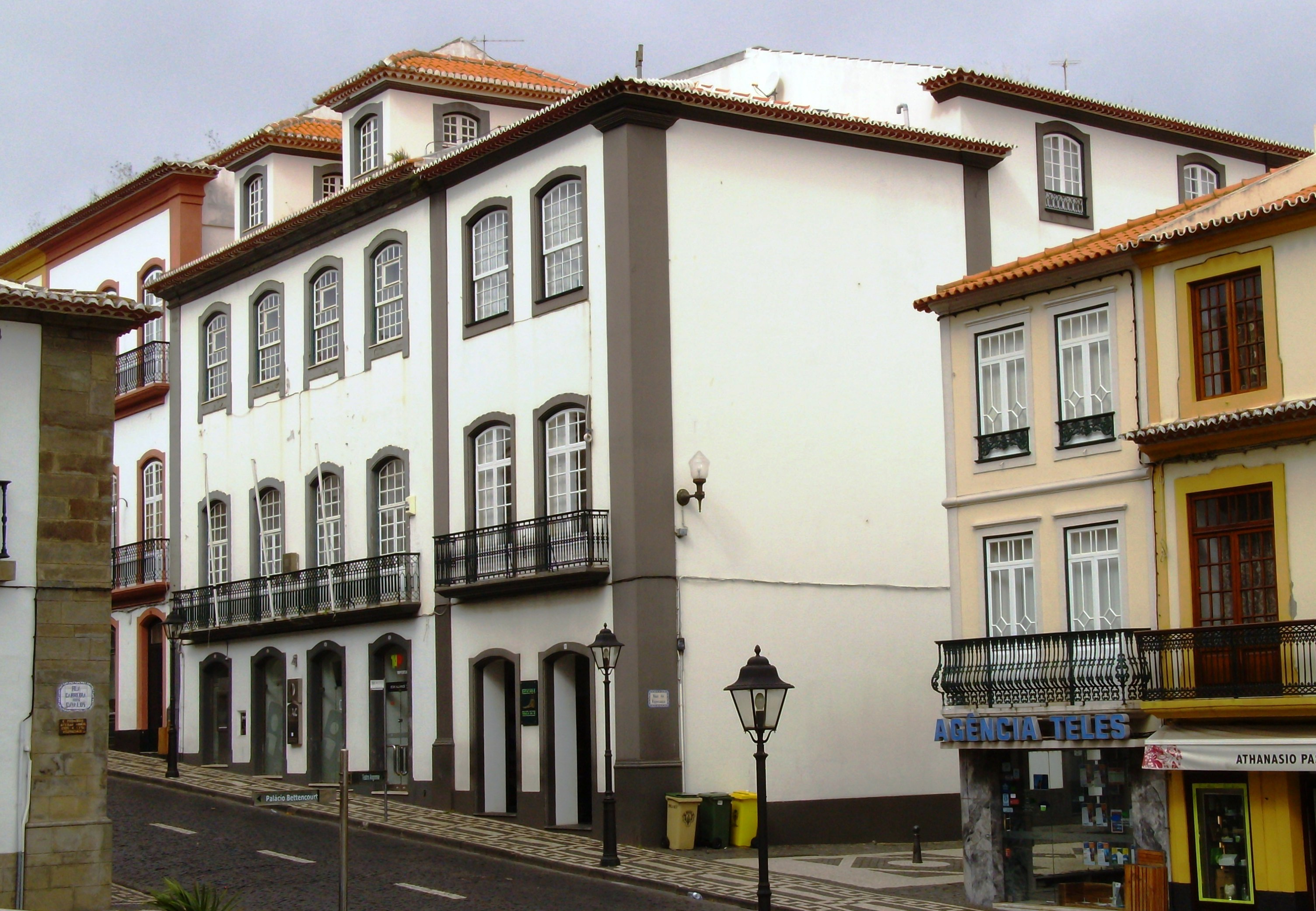
- The location and current buildings located on the site of the former convent, later Synagogue Ets Haim

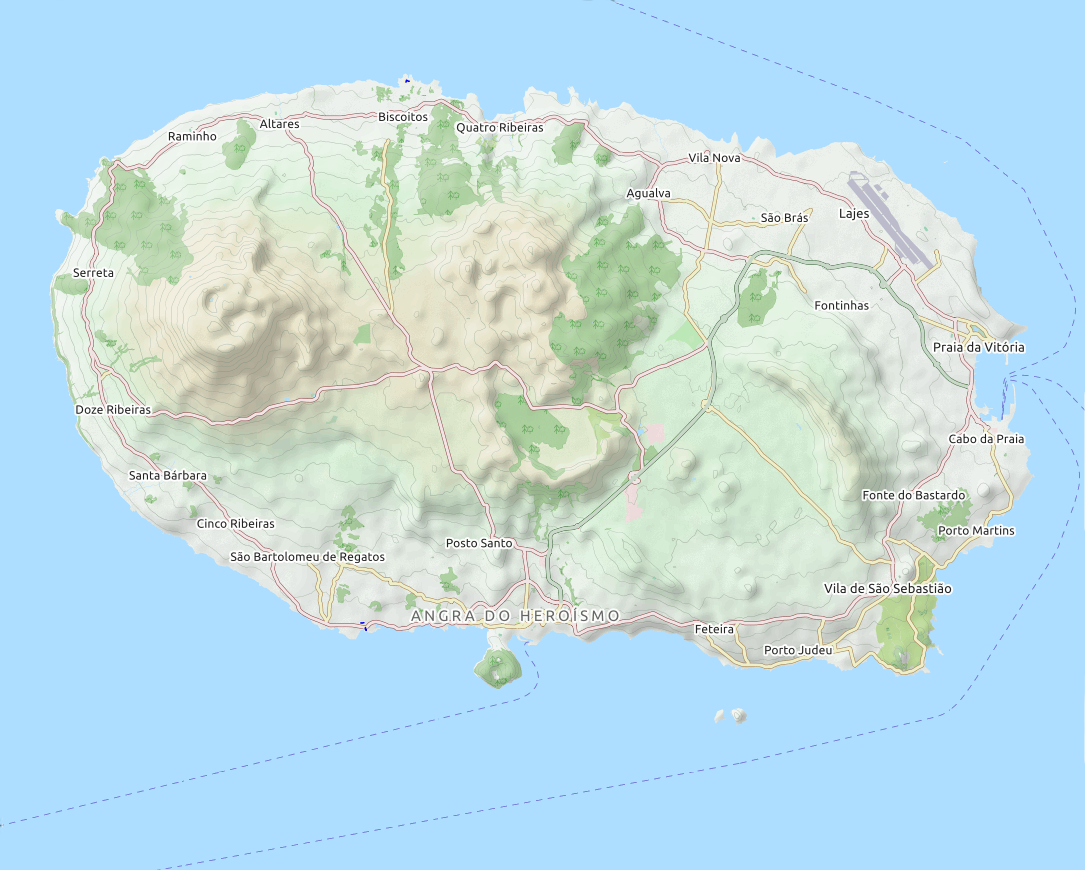
- Location of the former-convent in the municipality of Angra do Heroismo

General information
- Type: Convent
- Location: Sé, Angra do Heroísmo, Portugal
- Coordinates: 38°39′21″N 27°13′17″W
- Owner: Portuguese Republic

Technical details
- Material: Stone

The Convent of Esperança (Portuguese: Convento da Esperança) was a former Christian religious building, situated in the Historical Centre of Angra do Heroísmo, in the civil parish of Sé, on the island of Terceira, in the archipelago of the Azores.

== History ==
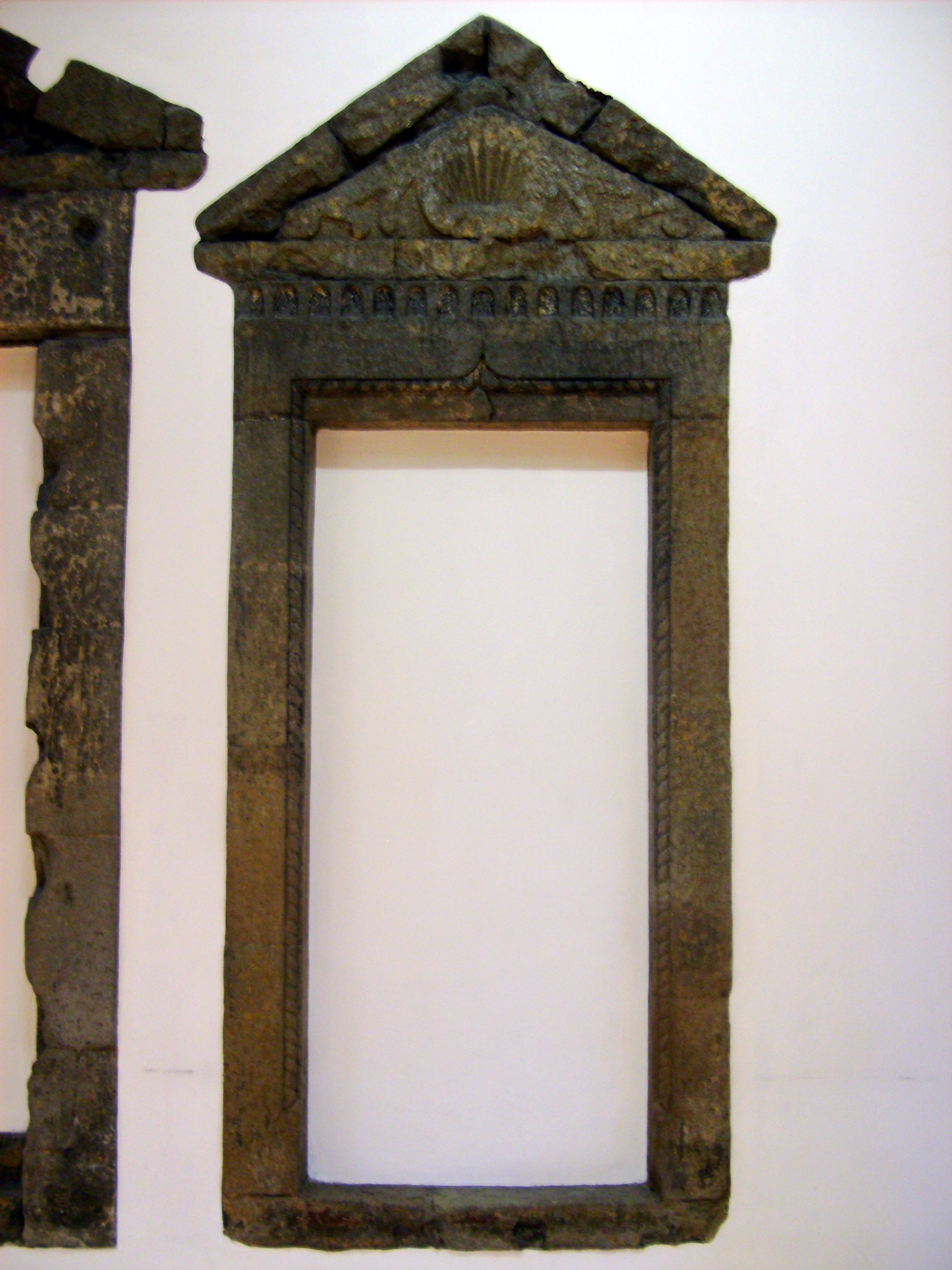
One of the main framed arches rediscovered in the former building of the Convent of Poor Clares

The building was one of the oldest, of the nine convents that existed on the island. Belonging to the Order of Poor Clares, it was very similar to Convent of São Gonçalo, and founded in the second half of the 16th century.

It was frequently visited by King António, Prior of Crato when he was residing in Angra.

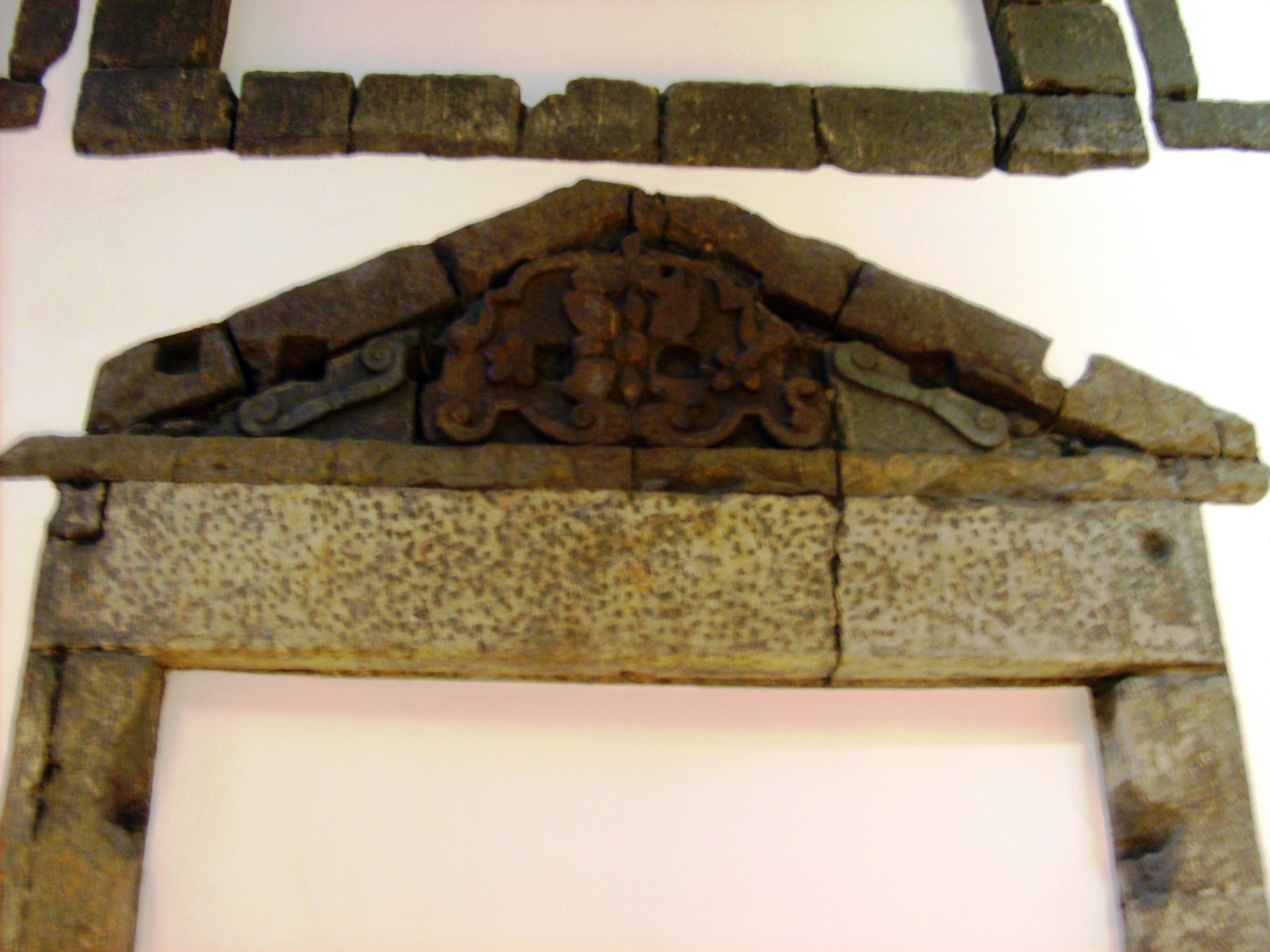
Detail of one of the arches

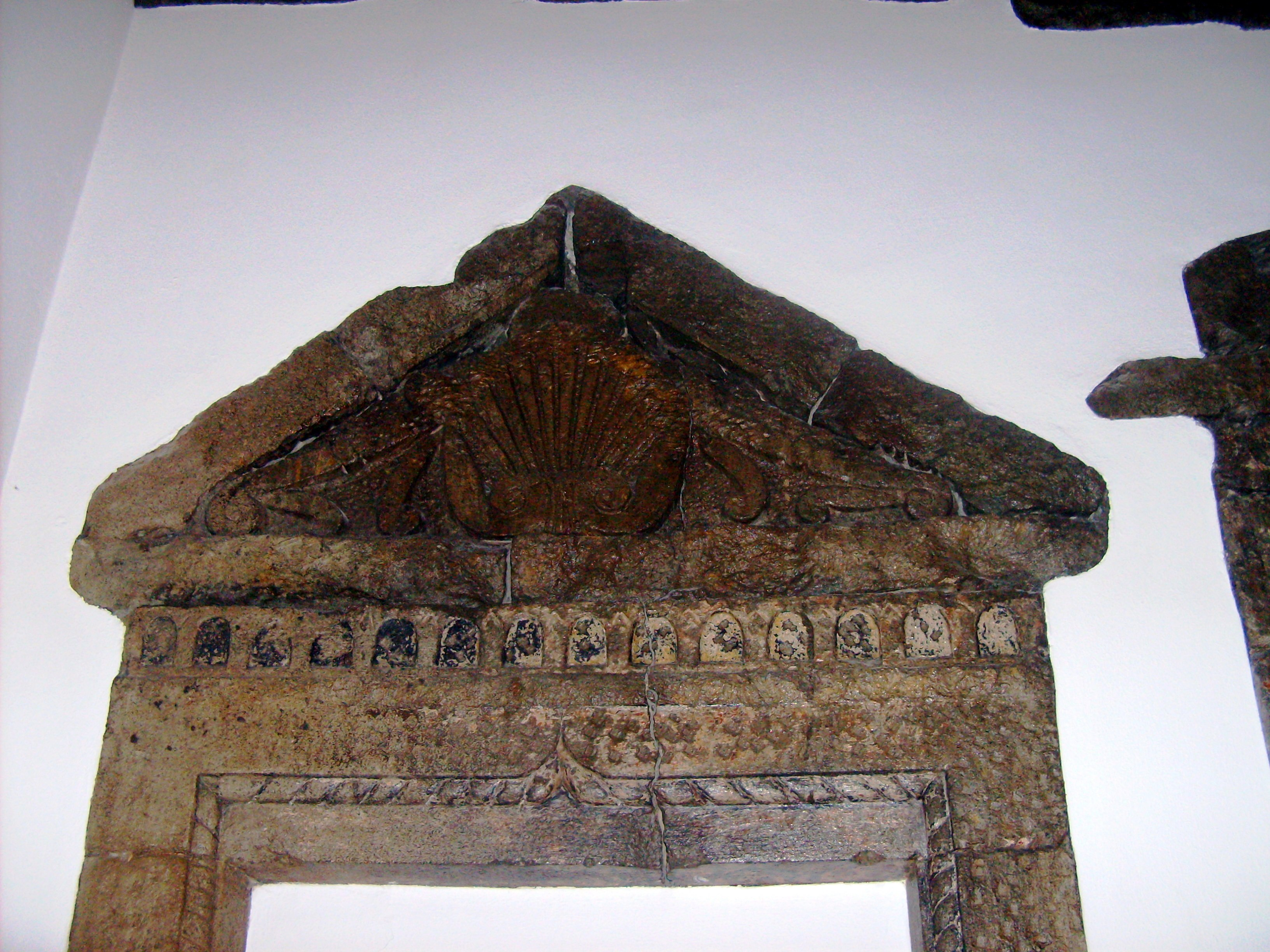
Detail of one of the arches

During the Liberal Wars, on a visit by Peter IV in March 1832, he met a young 23-year-old initiate, when she was in the belltower. From the relationship with Ana Augusta Peregrino Faleiro Toste (1809-1896) they had one child, baptised Pedro, who lived to 4 or 5 years, and was buried in the courtyard of the Sé Cathedral. On this occasion, the constitutional party provided a solemn burial, playing the funeral march of the Volunteer Battalion of Queen Maria II (then led by Colonel Teotónio de Ornelas Bruges Paim da Câmara, Viscount of Bruges. The mother, never left the order, and received a monthly stipend of less than 15$000 Portuguese reis.

By decree, the religious orders were extinguished in 1834, and the building was partitioned and sold.

Adapted for other purposes in the 19th century, it served as a residence and functioned as Synagogue Ets Haim).

The building (its owners and uses) almost became forgotten, until the restoration following the 1980 Azores earthquake, when the architectural elements were rediscovered (such as the openings to the choir and arch of the main chapel).
