= Basilica and Convent of Nossa Senhora do Carmo, Recife =

Coordinates: 8.0662°S 34.8800°W

Basílica e Convento de Nossa Senhora do Carmo
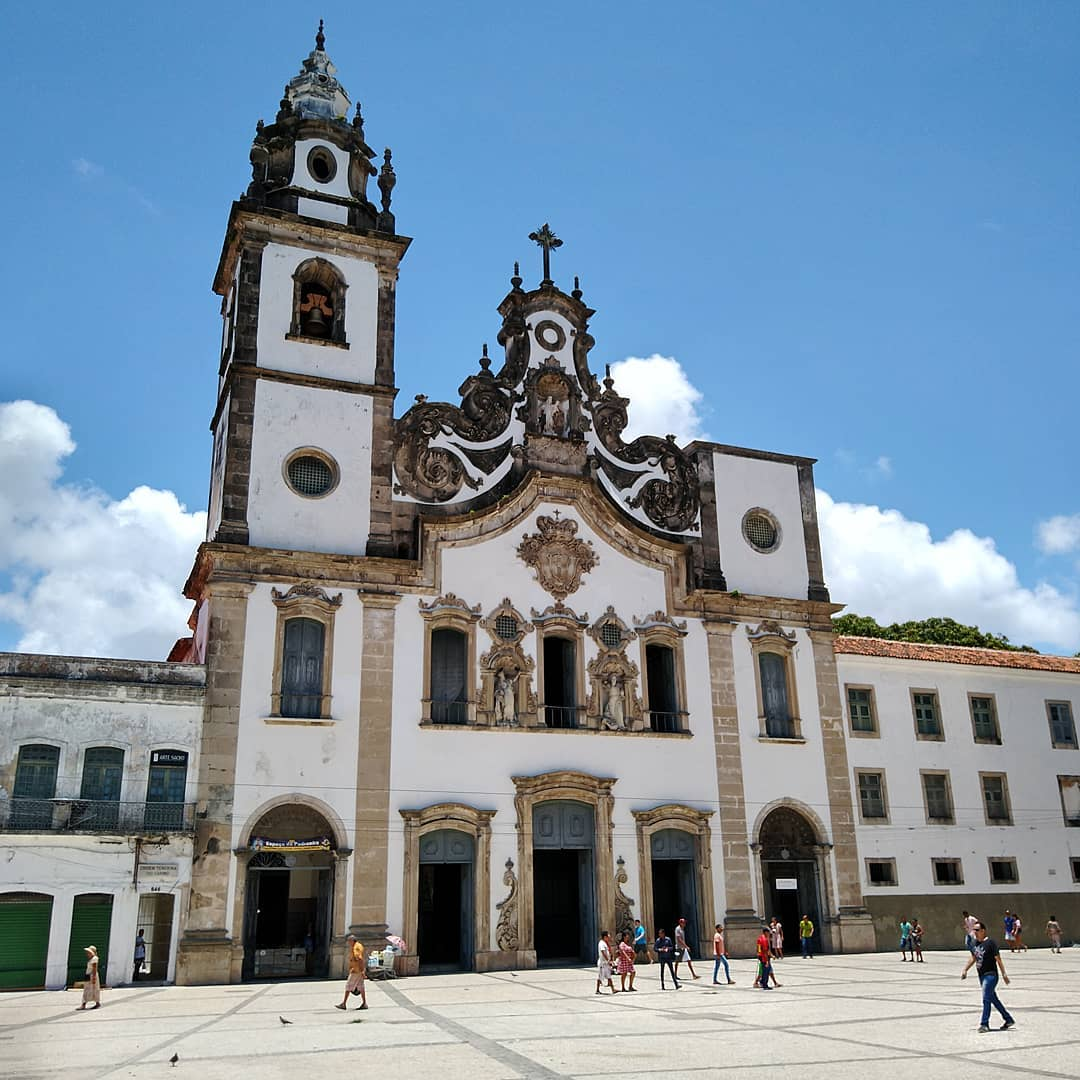
- Basílica e Convento de Nossa Senhora do Carmo
- Location: Recife
- Country: Brazil
- Denomination: Roman Catholic Church

Architecture
- Style: Baroque
- Groundbreaking: 1665
- Completed: 1767

The Basilica and Convent of Nossa Senhora do Carmo (transl. Basilica and Convent of Our Lady of Mount Carmel), also called as Basilica of Recife, is a Catholic architectural complex, belonging to the Our Lady of Mount Carmel, that is in Recife, Pernambuco State, Brazil.

== History ==
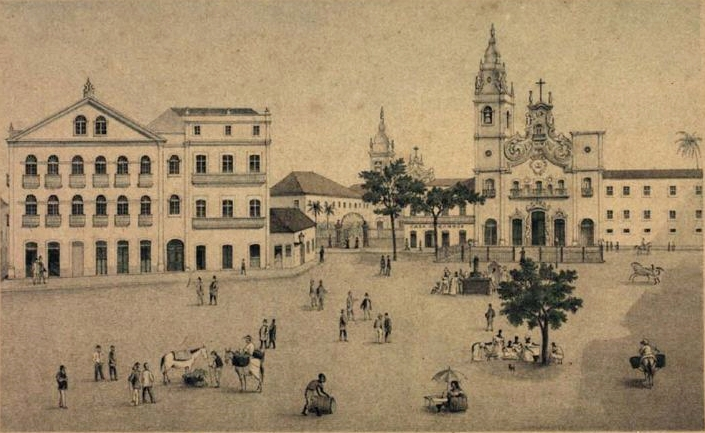
View of the Pátio do Carmo Square in 1878.

The first Carmelite friars arrived in Brazil in 1580, coming from Portugal. In 1584, with the foundation of a convent in Olinda the first one built in Brazil, the first Brazilian festivity was held in honor of Our Lady of Mount Carmel.

In 1654 the Our Lady of Mount Carmel was established in Recife. In 1665, Captain Diogo Cavalcanti Vasconcelos began the construction of the basilica and ordered the execution of the main chapel at his own expense, without the royal license which, demanded in 1674, was granted only on March 8, 1687. In that same year the Reduto da Boa Vista, erected by John Maurice, Prince of Nassau-Siegen, was donated to the Order to be integrated into the complex of the basilica and the convent. The temple was completed almost one hundred years later, in 1767.

In this church, the head of Zumbi dos Palmares was exposed until complete decomposition.

The church is where Frei Caneca made his religious vows and became a priest, and where he is supposed to be buried.

In 1909 the Our Lady of Mount Carmel was proclaimed Patroness of Recife, and was canonically crowned on 21 September 1919 by a pontifical decree from Pope Benedict XV. In 1917, the church was added to the St. Peter's Basilica in the Vatican City. In 1922, the temple was elevated to the status of a basilica.

The basilica and the Convent do Carmo were registered on October 5, 1938, by the National Institute of Historic and Artistic Heritage (IPHAN).

== Architecture ==
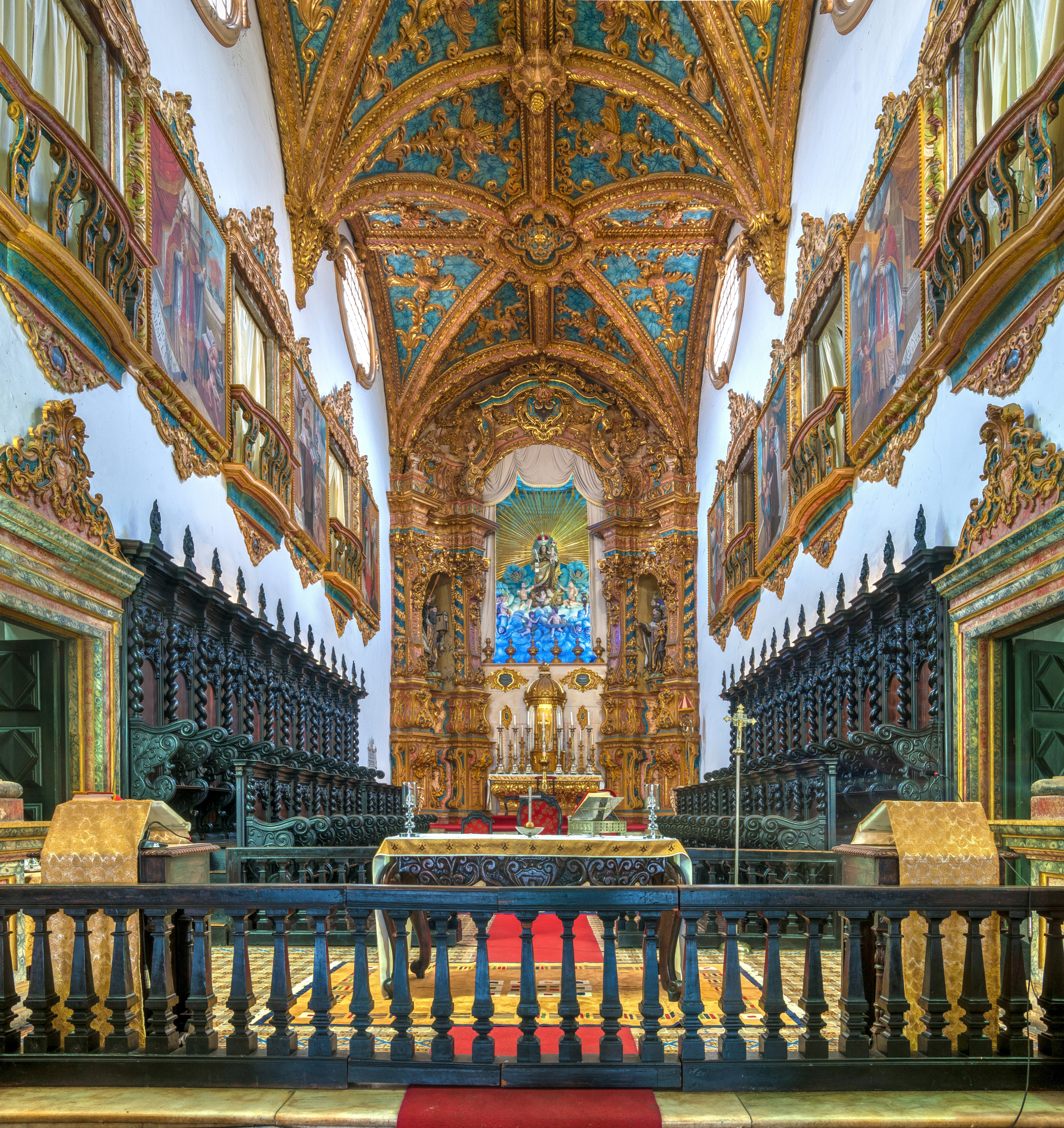
Interior

The church follows the Baroque style. The main body has two floors, both with three openings of bowed arches and ornaments in stonemasonry. On the upper floor, between the windows, there are two niches with statues, interconnected in the upper part of the oculus filled with grids, and also framed. Above, a triangular frontispiece of truncated vertices and curved sides, with the shield of the Order, heavy flowery volutes, and culminating with a niche with an image of Our Lady, pinnacles and a cross. Laterally the church has two towers, the one on the right remains unfinished, and the one on the left, about 50 meters high, stands on four floors, with openings of shape of varying size: that of the base is a door with arch, and a successively open arch door, with a baluster, a simple oculus, and a bell-window also in full arc. Crowning the tower, a dome with several ornate overlapping cornices, oculus, pinnacles and cross.

In the interior its decoration in gilt is priceless. Among the highlights are the twelve secondary altars and the main chapel, with its fabulous altarpiece with a life-size image of Our Lady of Mount Carmel, lined with angels and saints, in a frame of luxuriant work of gold carving. The other altars are also richly decorated, highlighting those of Our Lady of the Candles and the one of St. Teresa of Ávila, Sts. Crispin and Crispinian.

Several interventions in the 19th and 20th centuries ended up de-characterizing some original aspects of the interior, especially the painting of the carvings. Practically the whole basilica was repainted in white and gold. A recent restoration project, which removed the overcoating layers, revealed all the beauty of the marbled decoration typical of the 18th century, with the basilica being reopened on July 6, 2001, after three years of work. Other alterations in the main altar included the enthronement of the present image of Our Lady, another one of Christ and the installation of a reliquary to guard the sacramental bread. The restoration of the chapel also contemplated the rosewood chair, with the restoration of lost parts of the wood and the recovery of the six panels with images of saints and the six tribunes with balusters that are above the stall.

== Gallery ==
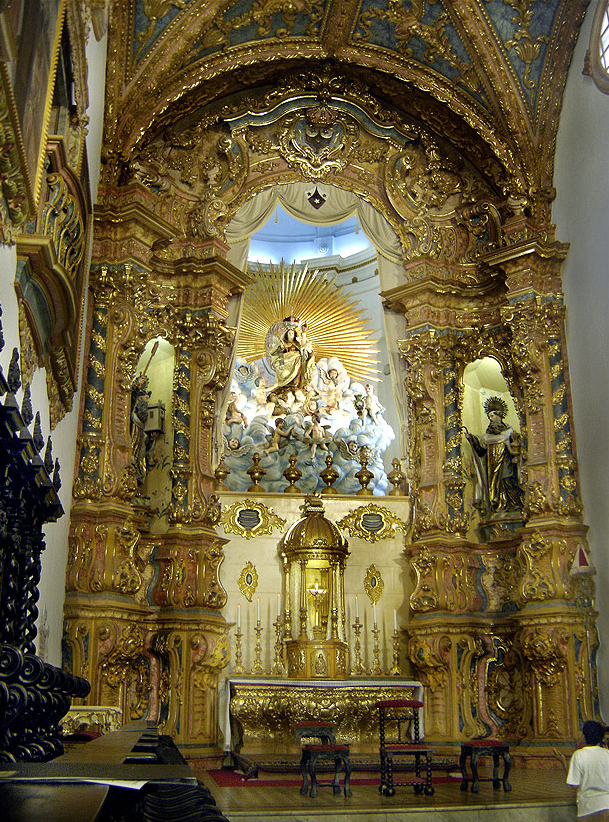
Altarpiece

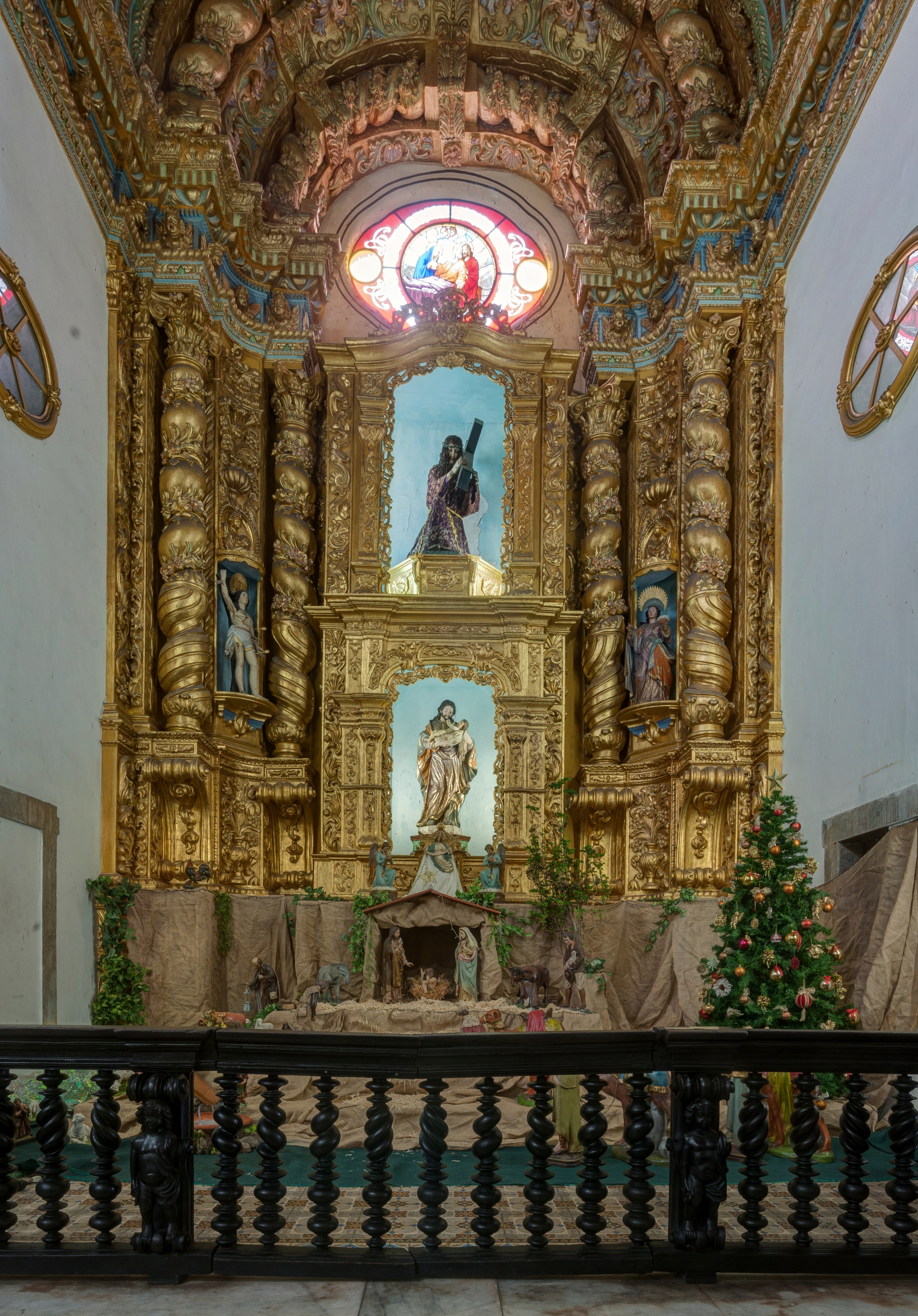
Transept

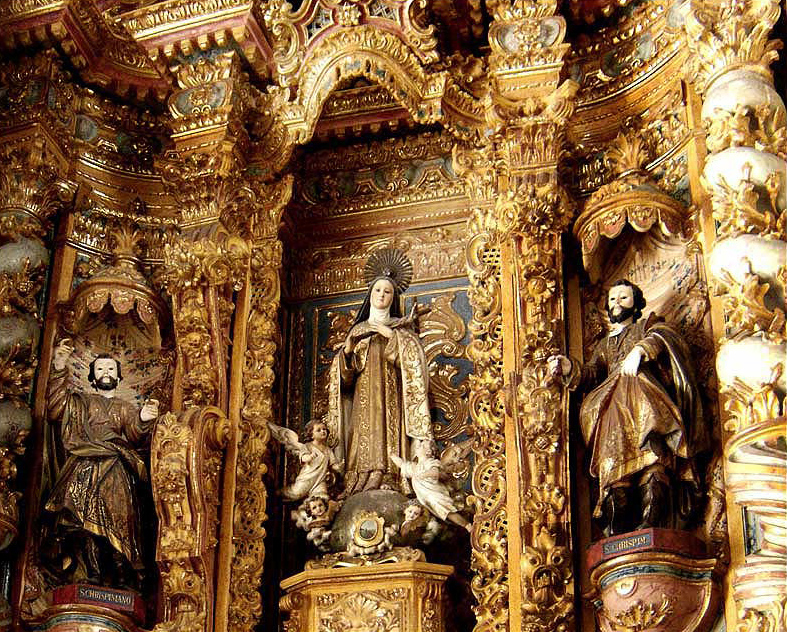
Detail of the altar of St. Teresa of Ávila, St. Crispin and St. Crispinian

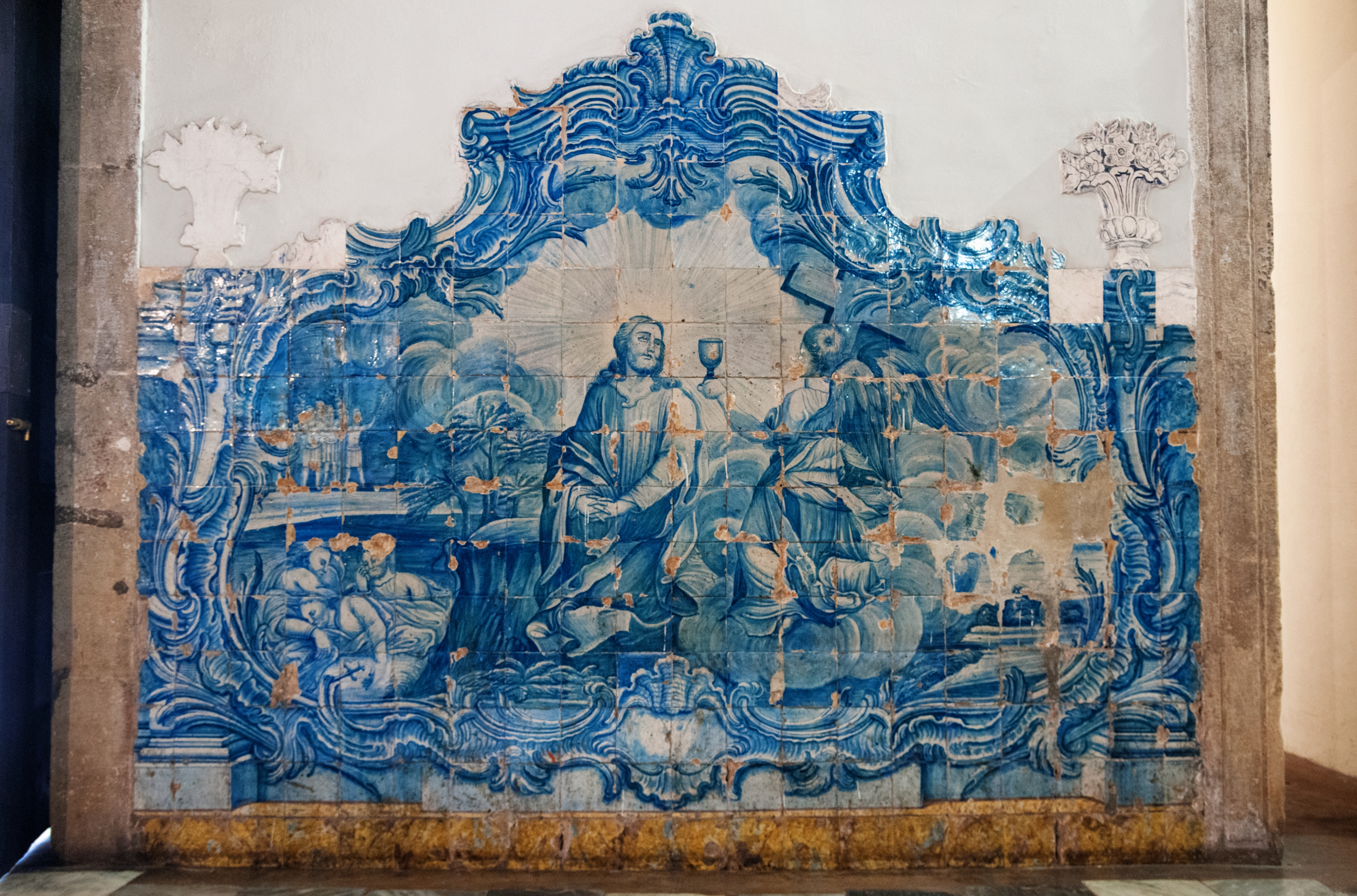
Azulejo

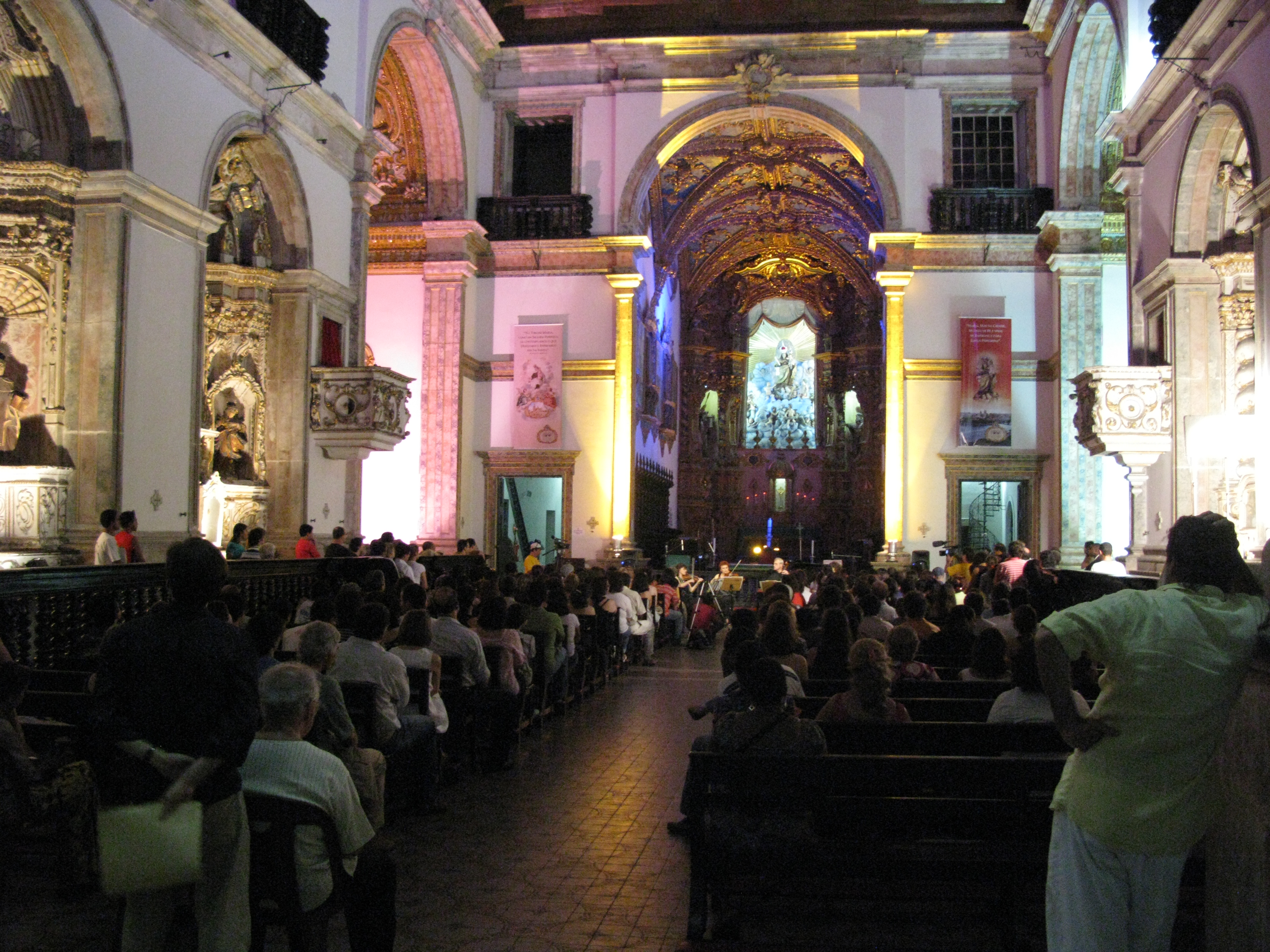
Inside the church, showing part of the nave and the main chapel
