= São Roque, Ponta Delgada =

São Roque
- Civil parish
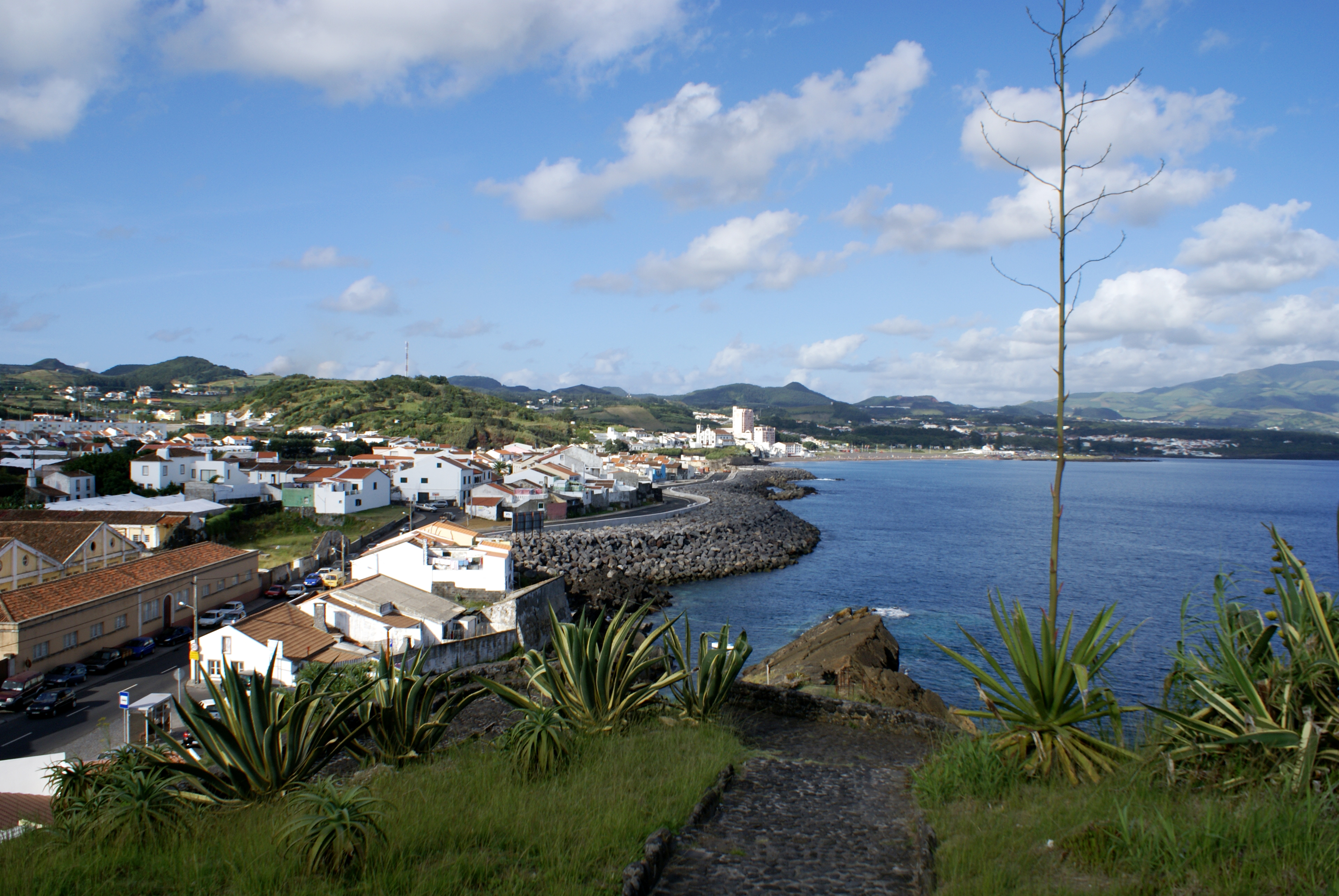
- A view towards the municipality of Lagoa, from the lookout on the São Roque coast, showing the coastal roadway that extends to the Praia das Malácias (beach)

- Location of the civil parish of São Roque in the municipality of Ponta Delgada
- Coordinates: 37°45′50″N 25°37′21″W
- Country: Portugal
- Auton. region: Azores
- Island: São Miguel
- Municipality: Ponta Delgada

Area
  - Total: 7.21 km^{2} (2.78 sq mi)
- Elevation: 96 m (315 ft)

Population (2011)
  - Total: 4,932
  - Density: 684/km^{2} (1,770/sq mi)
- Time zone: UTC−01:00 (AZOT)
  - Summer (DST): UTC+00:00 (AZOST)
- Postal code: 9500-715
- Area code: 292
- Patron: São Roque

São Roque is a civil parish in the municipality of Ponta Delgada in the Portuguese archipelago of the Azores. The population in 2011 was 4,932, in an area of 7.21 square kilometres (2.78 mi^{2}).

== History ==
Its founding originated in the 16th century, although the first documents, referring to the São Roque date to 1563. The Azores Archive, stated:

"A few miles east of the city of Ponta Delgada is the village of Rosto do Cão...The country homes of a few citizens are delicatebly situated in this village, and the soil in the vicinity is the better cultivated then a large part of the regions of the island..."

The parochial church to St. Roch, remotes the 16th century, and was altered in the 17th and 18th century, and was erected over an older temple sited in the cliffs. The primitive hermitage was built in the 16th century; Gaspar Frutuoso, the chronicler and humanist was relatively silent on when it was founded, but referred to the 15th century.

== Geography ==
The parish of São Roque, which is situated along the southern coast of Ponta Delgada, and includes smaller neighbourhoods such as Praia dos Santos, Terreiro, Madalena, Poço Velho and Pico das Canas. It is primarily known for its main beaches, that include Praia de São Roque, and the much larger Praia da Milicia, which is normally confused with the neighbouring Praia do Pópulo (in Livramento). Along with the civil parish of Livramento, the region is known as the unincorporated district of Rosto do Cão.

== Architecture ==
Highlighted by the main parochial church, this temple includes the "Chapel of the Holies" (Portuguese: Capela do Santíssimo), an altar of immense value, that was decorated in hand-painted azulejo tile. It was also important for being the resting-place for the grandmother of the Marquês e Pombal.

== Culture ==
The festival in honour of the patron saint occurs on the third Sunday of August.
