= Holy Saviour of the World Cathedral, Olinda =

Holy Saviour of the World Cathedral
- Catedral Metropolitana São Salvador do Mundo
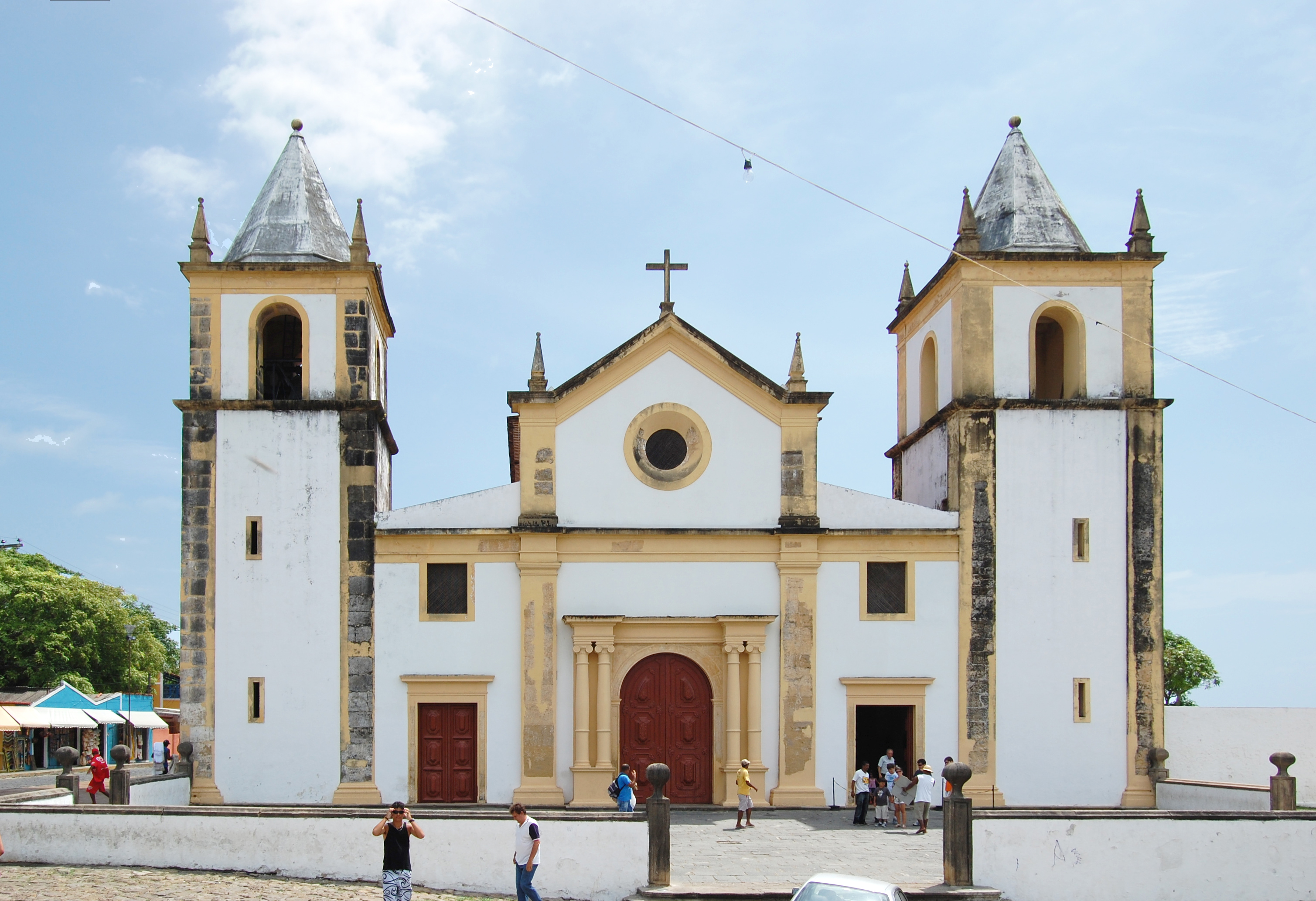
- Holy Saviour of the World Cathedral
- Location: Olinda
- Country: Brazil
- Denomination: Roman Catholic Church

Administration
- Archdiocese: Olinda e Recife

The Holy Saviour of the World Cathedral (Portuguese: Catedral Metropolitana São Salvador do Mundo) Also Olinda Cathedral is a Catholic church located in Olinda, in the state of Pernambuco, home of the archdiocese of Olinda and Recife in Brazil.

The first building built for worship in the present site of the headquarters was a simple chapel. It was raised between 1537 and 1540 and dedicated to Jesus Christ as Savior of the world. The mud, a material of little resistance used, caused that the chapel soon began to decay, and was replaced by another temple in 1584, with several secondary chapels erected by initiative of Frei Antonio Barreiro, third bishop of Brazil.

In 1676, it was elevated to the condition of cathedral with the creation of the respective diocese.

== See also ==
- Roman Catholicism in Brazil
- Holy Saviour

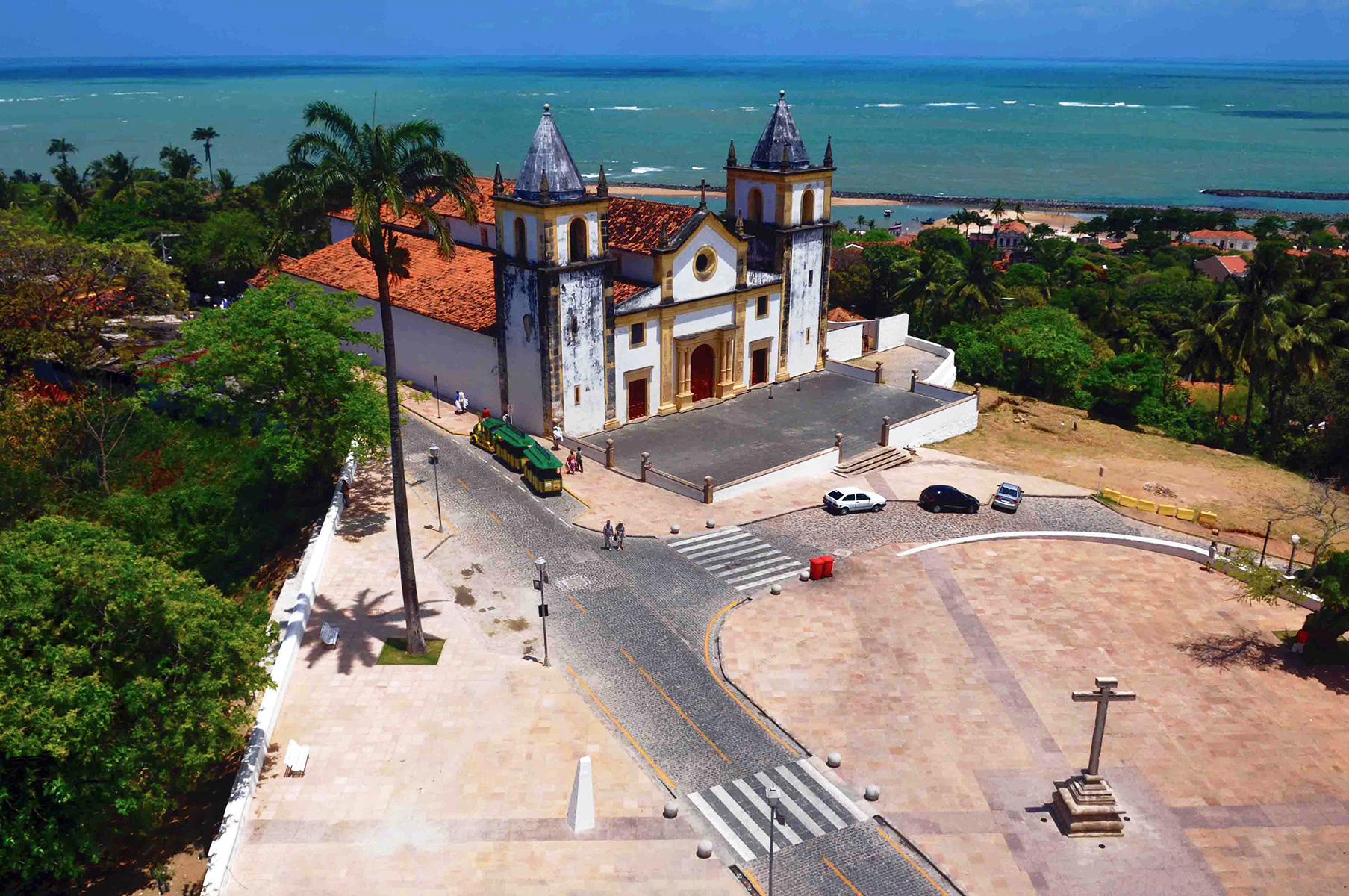
Another View
