= Livramento (Ponta Delgada) =

- Civil parish
- Location of the civil parish of Livramento in the municipality of Ponta Delgada
- Coordinates: 37°45′29″N 25°36′21″W
- Country: Portugal
- Auton. region: Azores
- Island: São Miguel
- Municipality: Ponta Delgada
- Established: Settlement: fl. 1800; Parish: 11 December 1838

Area
  - Total: 5.59 km^{2} (2.16 sq mi)
- Elevation: 62 m (203 ft)

Population (2011)
  - Total: 4,062
  - Density: 730/km^{2} (1,900/sq mi)
- Time zone: UTC−01:00 (AZOT)
  - Summer (DST): UTC+00:00 (AZOST)
- Postal code: 9500-614
- Area code: 292
- Patron: Nossa Senhora do Livramento
- Website: livramento.no.sapo.pt

Livramento is a civil parish in the municipality of Ponta Delgada in the Portuguese archipelago of the Azores. The population in 2011 was 4,062, in an area of 5.59 square kilometres (2.16 sq mi).

== History ==
Historically, along with the adjacent parish São Roque, it formed a region known as Rosto do Cão (Dog's Face). It was so named by early settlers for the rocky peninsula, that they imagined mimicked a dog looking out to sea. The area, in fact, was constructed from the remnants of an ancient volcanic crater.

Popular tradition tells of an English family that escaped to this region, and who were sought by Queen Victoria. The family, upon arriving, raised a small hermitage to the invocation of Our Lady of Freedom, for their escape.

There are conflicting interpretations on the building of the parochial church; some suggest that Father João Alves de Lordelo ordered the church in the 17th century, while others claim that its state occurred from remodelling occurring in 1794. Other religious buildings constructed in the region include the hermitage of Nossa Senhora das Necessidades, which was constructed in 1830; the Hermitage of Jesus, Mary and Joseph, along Canada do Bago, concluded in the second-half of the 17th century; the Hermitage of Our Lady of Mount Carmel, raised during the middle of the 17th century; and the Hermitage of Nossa Senhora do Pópulo, founded by Jacques de Padron.

There are many manorhouses located within the parish, constructed during the first half of the 19th century, during the height of the orange cycle, when the Azores was an obligatory stopover for the collection of oranges, for long-distance sea voyages. Estate homes, like the Solar do Botelho, were built from the wealth created from the cultivation of citrus orchards.

== Geography ==
Livramento is located in the southwestern part of the island of São Miguel, on the south coast.
