= Capela Dourada =

- Interior
- Capela Dourada
- Location: Recife
- Country: Brazil
- Denomination: Roman Catholic

History
- Founded: 1585

Architecture
- Architect: Antônio Fernandes de Matos
- Style: Baroque
- Groundbreaking: 1696
- Completed: 1724

The Capela Dourada (lit. 'Golden Chapel'), also called Capela dos Noviços (lit. 'Chapel of the Novices'), is a chapel of the Franciscan Order located in the city of Recife, capital of the Pernambuco State, Brazil within the set of buildings of the Convent and Church of Santo Antônio, that includes the Church of the Ordem Terceira de São Francisco and the Franciscan Museum of Religious Art.

== History and description ==
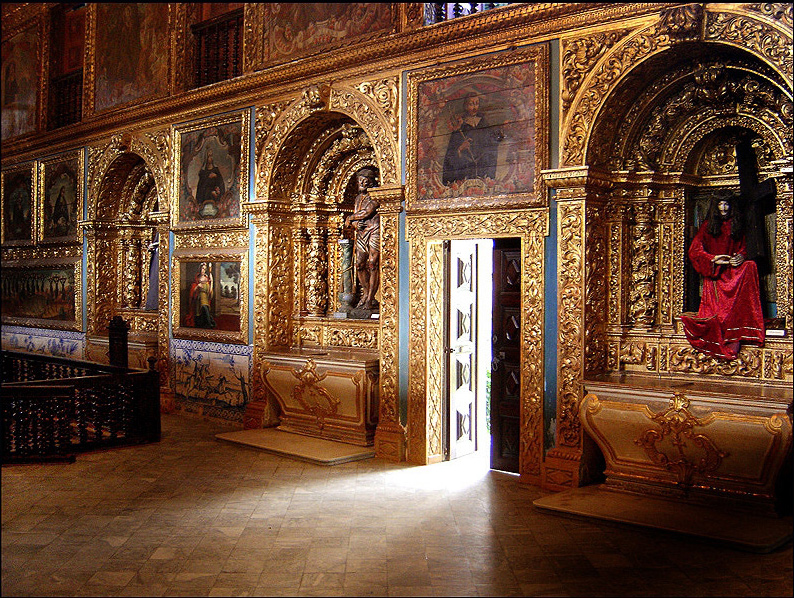
The decorative reliefs are carved in wood and covered with thin layers of gold.

The construction of the chapel was the result of an initiative of the Brothers of the Venerable Third Order of St. Francis of the Chagas, created in Recife in the 16th century. Since many of its members were well-off, they decided to erect a chapel for the Order's novices. The cornerstone was launched on May 13, 1696 by Captain General Caetano de Melo Castro, being master-builder Portuguese Captain Antônio Fernandes de Matos. The chapel was opened to the public on September 15, 1697, with mass presided over by the Commissary Visitor Friar Jerônimo da Ressurreição, although it was not yet entirely finished, remaining the works until 1724.

Built in a time of great prosperity in the region, over time the chapel received improvements and rich decoration, and its present condition dates basically of the 17th, 18th and 19th centuries. Its name derives from the great quantity of gold used in the covering of the exuberant wood that fills practically all the spaces of the walls, altars and ceiling.

Its construction and decoration was attended by several important artists in the region. The ceiling with the external arches, the croiser and the main chapel, as well as auxiliary furniture, are the work of Luís Machado, of the 17th century. The ceiling is divided into caskets for oil-painted panels with various scenes.

The main chapel, with a central niche for a large crucifix and side niches for Saints Cosmas and Damian, was carved by Antônio Martins Santiago in 1698, and was gilded by Manuel de Jesus Pinto in 1799.

Along the side walls there is a series of panels of azulejos, smaller altars with important statues, of which stand out the one of St. Elizabeth of Portugal, the christ Cristo atado à coluna, and that of the Lord of the Steps (With a life-size rock image with inlays of rubies), and dozens of painted panels depicting saints and personifications of the Faith, Hope, Charity and Constance. We sadly know that not even the archives of the Order, patiently refined, were able to advance us names of artists who had worked on these wonderful paintings. We only know that these paintings were executed between the years 1699 and 1700 and the panels of the lining between 1701 and 1702, according to the book of Receita e Despesa (excerpt taken from the Book of the Historian Fernando Pio, Former Minister of the Third Order of Saint Francis who wrote all about the Golden Chapel with research done in the collection of the Venerable Third Order of the Glorious Patriarch Saint Francis of Assisi of Recife). From 1776 to 1777 he suffered the lining of the chapel serious repair, without prejudice to the coffins, supported by careful hands, being worthy of greater attention two, large, next to the benches, representing the arrest and death of the Franciscans, whose tormentors, curiously, had their faces erased and scratched, in date unknown, by the indignation of some devotee.

In the sacristy there is also furniture carved in rosewood, dating to 1762, in addition to a marble table and a washbasin imported from Estremoz.
