= Forte de São João da Bertioga =

- Bertioga, São Paulo in Brazil
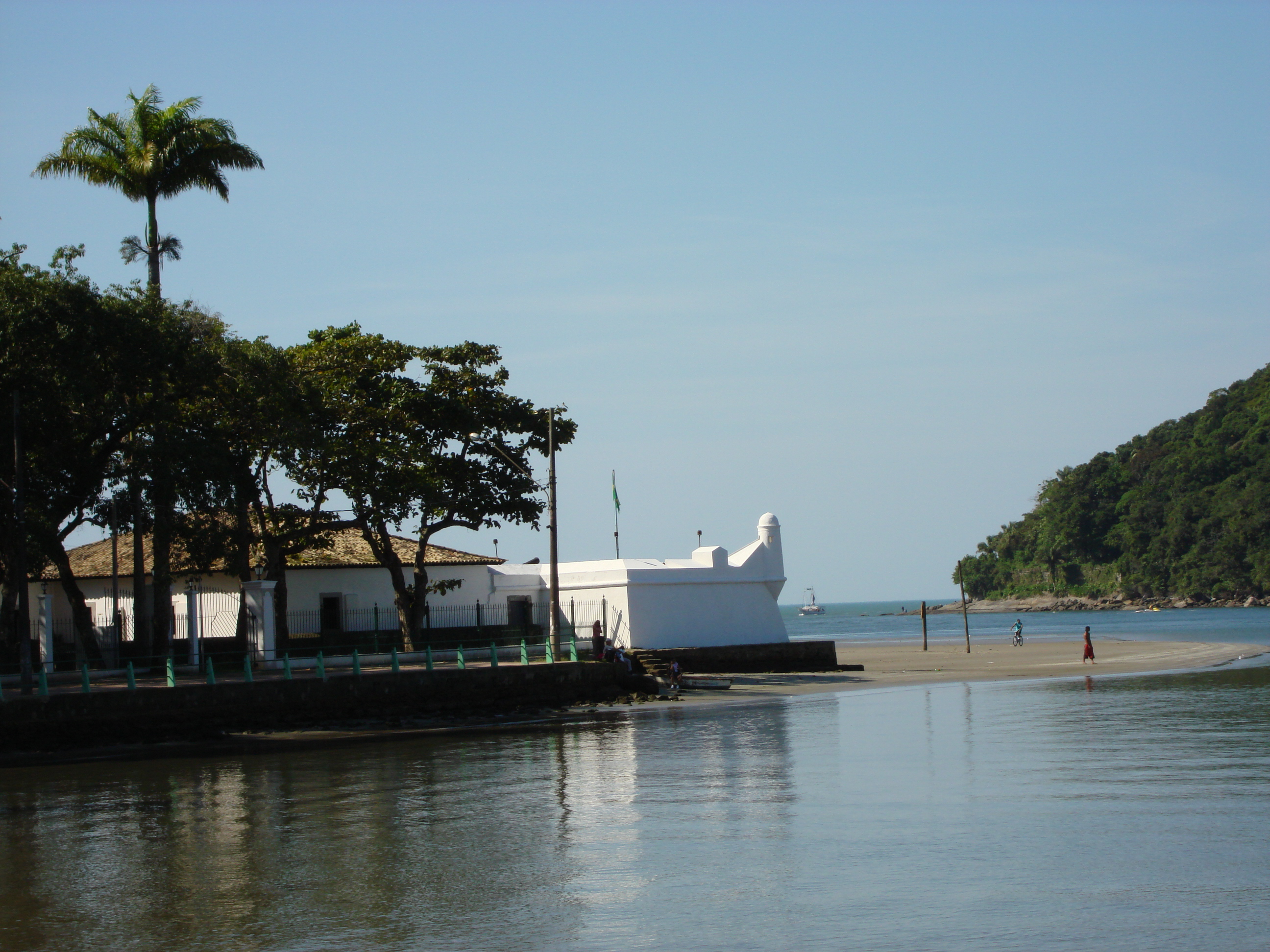
- View of fort

Site information
- Type: Fort
- Open to the public: Yes
- Condition: Good

Location
- Location of Forte São João in Brazil
- Coordinates: 23.855278°S 46.134722°W

Forte de São João da Bertioga is a fort located on municipality of Bertioga, São Paulo in Brazil.

== See also ==
- Military history of Brazil
