= Frame conservation =

Frame conservation is the preservation of picture frames. This involves replicating missing decorative elements, cleaning, gilding, and toning frame surfaces.

== Gilding ==
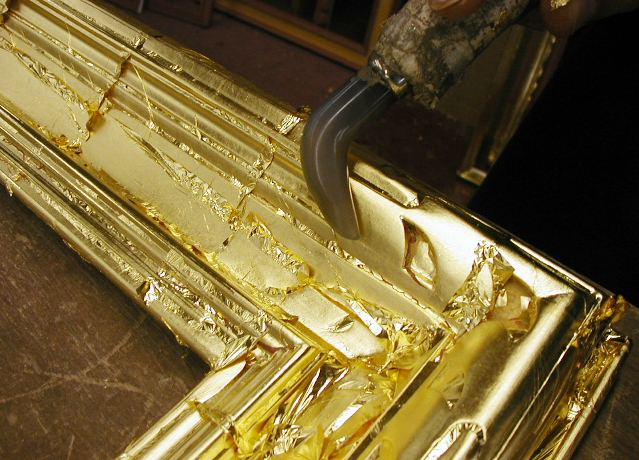
A gilded frame ready to be burnished with an agate tool

Gilding, in the context of frame preservation, describes the process by which metal leaf is applied to a frame to restore areas of the preexisting leaf, that have damage.
