= Foamcore =

Board of paper-faced rigid foam

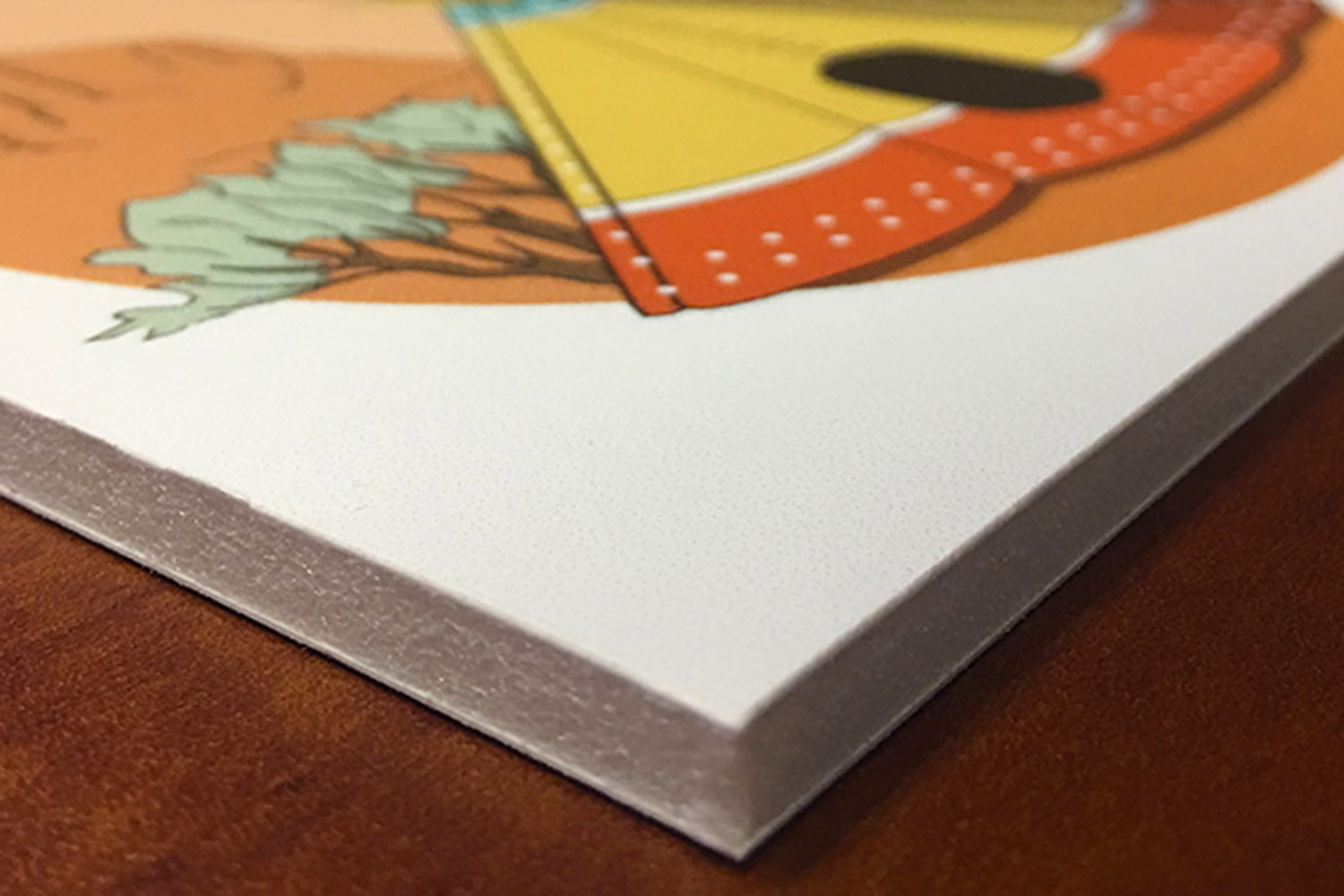
Sheet of foamboard

Foamcore, foam board, or paper-faced foam board is a lightweight and easily cut material used for mounting of photographic prints, as backing for picture framing, for making scale models, and in painting. It consists of a board of polystyrene foam clad with an outer facing of paper on either side, typically white clay-coated paper or brown kraft paper.

== History ==
The original white foamcore board was made in 1/8 and 3/16 inch (3.2 and 4.8 mm) thicknesses for the graphic arts industry by Monsanto Company under the trade name "Fome-Cor®" starting in 1961.

== Construction, variants and composition ==
The surface of the regular board, like many other types of paper, is slightly acidic. However, for modern archival picture framing and art mounting purposes it can be produced in a neutral, acid-free version with a buffered surface paper, in a wide range of sizes and thicknesses.

Foam-cored materials are also now available with a cladding of solid (non-foamed) polystyrene and other rigid plastic sheeting, some with a textured finish.

Foamcore does not adhere well to some glues, such as superglue, and certain types of paint. The foam tends to melt away and dissolve. Some glue works well in casual settings, however, the water in the glue can warp the fibers in the outer layers. Best results are typically obtained from higher-end spray adhesives. A hot glue gun can be used as a substitute, although the high viscosity of hot glues can affect finished projects in the form of board warping, bubbles, or other unsightly blemishes.

Self-adhesive foam boards, intended for art and document mounting are also available, though these can be very tricky to use properly; this is because the glue sets very fast. It is considered cheaper to buy plain foam board and use re-positionable spray mount adhesive.

Specialty constructions have been developed for engineering uses.

== Uses ==
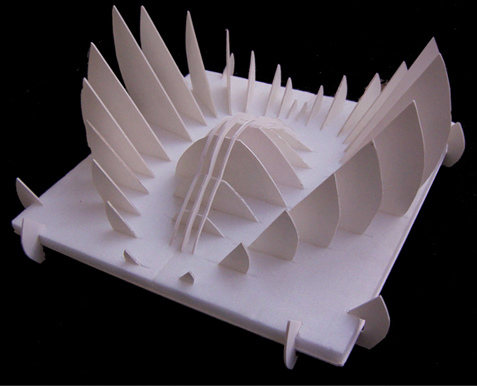
An architectural model made from foamcore on a styrofoam base

Foamcore is commonly used to produce architectural models, prototype small objects and to produce patterns for casting. Scenery for scale model displays, dioramas, and computer games are often produced by hobbyists from foamcore.

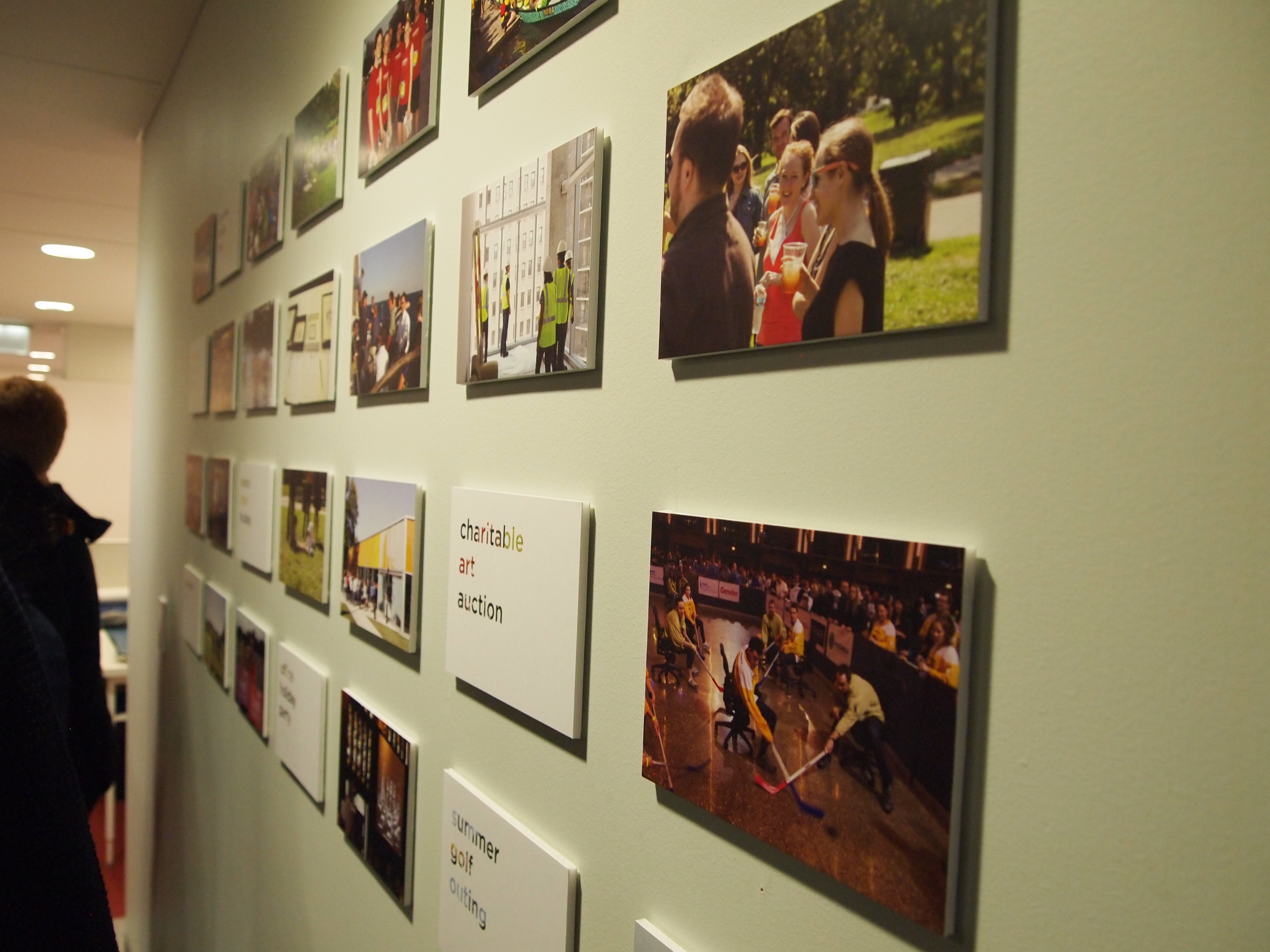
Photos on a foamcore backing

Foamcore is also often used by photographers as a reflector to bounce light, in the design industry to mount presentations of new products, and in picture framing as a backing material; the latter use includes some archival picture framing methods, which utilize the acid-free versions of the material. Another use is with aero-modellers for building radio-controlled aircraft.

Researchers at the University of Manchester created their Giant Foamboard Quadcopter (GFQ) claimed to be the largest possible Civil Aviation Authority licensed drone with an all-up weight (UWT) just below the maximum of 25 kg (55 lb).

== See also ==
- Corrugated fiberboard (Cardboard)
- Closed-cell PVC foamboard
- Arts and crafts
- Mat (picture framing)
