= Special edition =

Term used as a marketing incentive for products

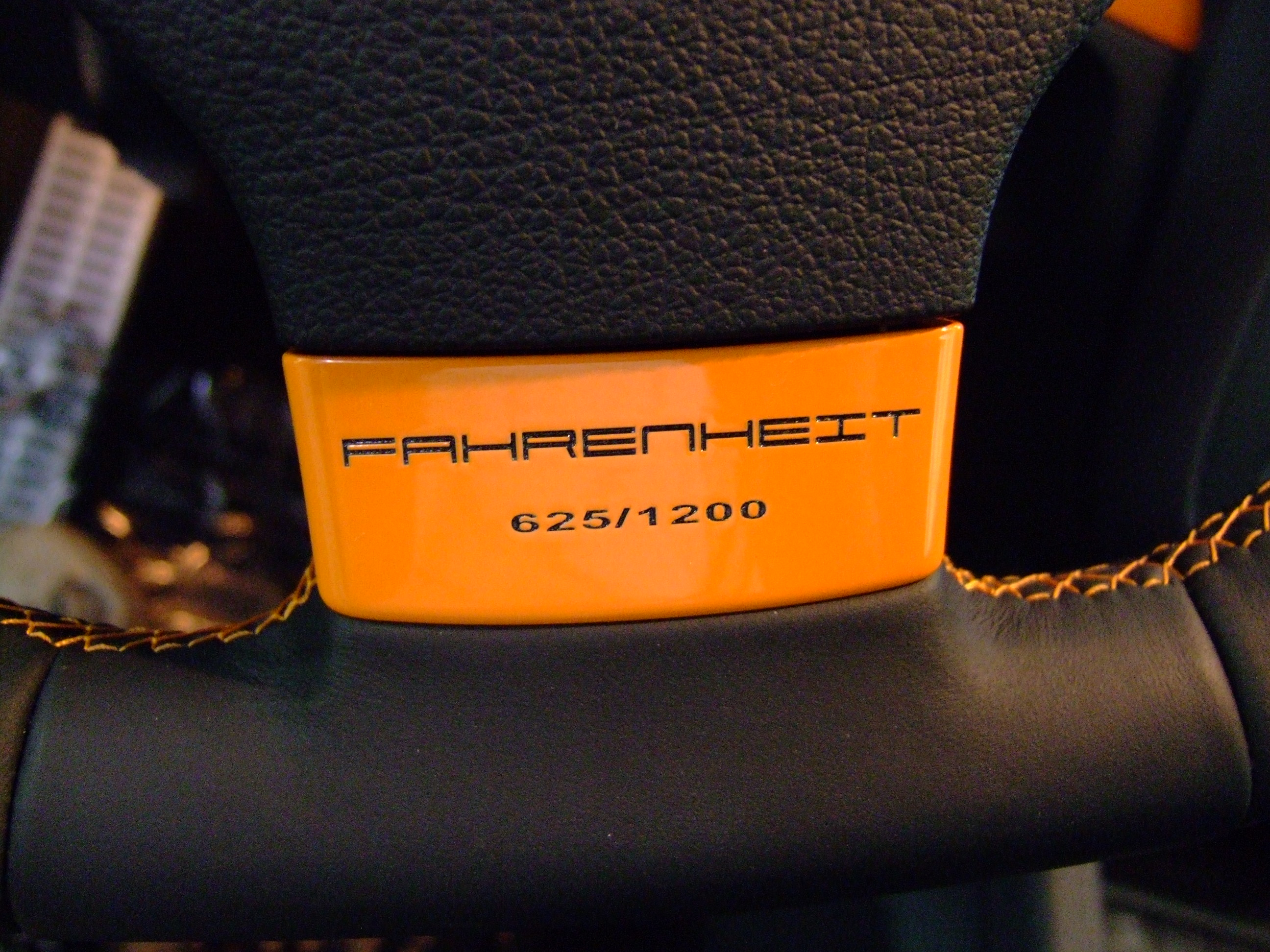
Numbering edition of 1,200 on the steering wheel of a Volkswagen GTI Fahrenheit

The terms special edition (SE) and limited edition (LE), and variants such as deluxe edition, collector's edition, expanded edition, or nth anniversary edition, are used as a marketing incentive for various kinds of products. The concept originated with published works related to the arts, such as books, prints, music, films, and video games, but now includes clothing, cars, alcohol, fast food, and other products and collectables.

A limited edition is restricted in the number of copies produced, though the number itself can range from very low to very high. Suzuki (2008) defines limited edition products as those "sold in a state that makes them difficult to obtain because of companies limiting their availability to a certain period, quantity, region, or channel". A special edition implies there is extra material of some kind included. The term is frequently used on DVD and Blu-ray film releases even when the so-called "special" edition is actually the only version released.

Limited time only (LTO) items are available only during a specific duration of time, and the format is increasingly used by restaurants and consumer goods manufacturers. LTO releases use the framing effect to drive sales.

== Collector's edition ==
Collector's edition of the 2026 video game Gears of War: E-Day, containing a custom steelbook case, an artbook, character figurines and an Xbox Series game disc

Collector's edition, aimed at collectors, is another term for special-edition products that include additional features or items that regular versions do not have. When referring to books, collector's edition products may refer to books in special limited and numbered editions; for example, they may be hand-bound, signed by the artist, or contain original works or prints.

== Books ==
Limited-edition books are released in a limited-quantity print run, usually fewer than 1,000 copies (much smaller than publishing-industry standards). Limited-edition books were introduced by publishers in the late 19th century.

The term also implies that no further additional printings of the book with the same design treatment will take place, unlike open-ended trade editions wherein further copies may be released in more print runs as the first and subsequent printings sell out.

Limited-edition books may also be numbered or lettered to distinguish in that set each book. For example, a numbered and limited book could have a marking such as "Copy 1 of a limited edition of 250 copies" or "1/250". Much less common is the lettered limited-edition book that could have denotations such as "1 of 26", "1/26", "A of 26", "Copy A", etc. Sometimes a copy of a limited-edition book is stated as being "out of series": this is an unnumbered copy, often a review copy.

In some instances, the limited-edition version contains additional material not found in the mass-market (or trade) version of the book, such as tipped-in pages or as a book and CD set. Likewise, they are sometimes housed in slipcases.

== Disc products ==
Popular culture widely employs Special, Deluxe, Expanded and Limited Edition in marketing, releasing subsequent, improved versions of film DVDs, music, and video games. Companies widely use special editions and incremental improvements to sell the same products to consumers multiple times. This has been seen in the 10th Anniversary edition of Titanic, which simply consists of the first two discs of the previous Special Collector's edition, only with new packaging, and on CD with the 30 Year Anniversary Edition of Bob Marley's Exodus, which has exactly the same content as the original album, but in new packaging.

In many cases, successful film releases have had items made in limited numbers. These "limited editions" usually contain the best DVD edition possible of a film with special items in a box set, sometimes containing items available only in the limited edition. Items marked thus are often (but not always) released for a shorter time and in lower quantity than common editions, often with a running number (e.g. "13055 of 20000") printed on the products to boost the rarity feel, as the company implies not to manufacture more. It is also common to have such items packaged with unique designs.

With the success of DVDs, special editions of films themselves (instead of just special editions of film DVDs) have also become fairly common. Sharing similarities with the concept of a director's cut (another long-suffering inflation-by-marketing term). These generally feature additional in-movie material. The material may be footage originally deleted from the final cut, or new digitally-created, interpolated content. Unlike true director's cuts, the directors may not have had part in such projects, such as in Superman II: The Richard Donner Cut, in which Richard Donner did not help create the new version, just supply the material. The Doctor Who television film "The Five Doctors" was edited, recut, amongst various other changes, to make the "Special Edition" in 1999 for the first DVD release of the episode.

== Limited edition prints ==
Limited edition prints, also known as LEs, have been standard in printmaking from the nineteenth century onwards. A limit to the print run is crucial, as many traditional printmaking techniques can only produce a limited number of best quality impressions. This can be as few as ten or twenty for a technique like drypoint, but more commonly would be in the low hundreds - print runs of over a thousand are regarded as dubious by the serious art market for original prints, even though with many techniques there is no loss of quality.

Edition sizes higher than about 500 are likely to be of print reproductions of paintings, of much less value, though some modern techniques blur this traditional distinction. As in other fields, the use of the concept has become largely driven by marketing imperatives, and has been misused in parts of the market. In particular, lithographic, photogravure, rotogravure, and giclee reproductions of prints, derived from photographs of an original print, which are most unlikely to have any investment value, are often issued in limited editions implying that they will have such value. These need to be distinguished from the original artist's print, carefully produced directly from his work, and printed under the artist's supervision.

=== Consumer protection ===
In the UK, Ireland, and New Zealand, the Fine Art Trade Guild ensures the quality and verification of limited edition prints by employing a number of strictly administered regulations for all processes and aspects related to them.

In the United States, limited editions are regulated under state consumer protections laws. California became the first state to regulate the sale of limited edition art prints with the "California Print Law" of 1971. The state of Illinois later expanded on the California statute. It was not until 1986, however, that more comprehensive provisions, still in place today, were enacted in Georgia with the passage of the Georgia Print Law. That law became the template for statutes subsequently enacted by other states.

The Georgia Print Law, written by State Representative Chesley V. Morton, became effective July 1, 1986. The law requires art dealers, artists, or auctioneers to supply information to prospective purchasers about the nature of the print, the number of prints and editions (including HC editions) produced, and the involvement (if any) of the artist in the creation of the print. The penalty for violation of the law ranges from simple reimbursement to treble damages, in the case of a willful violation. Those found to be in violation of the law are also liable for court costs, expenses, and attorney fees. The law applies to works of art valued at more than $100.00 (not including frame). Charitable organizations are specifically exempt from the provision of the law. The statute of limitations is one year after discovery, and, if discovery of the violation is not made within three years of the sale, then the purchaser's remedies are extinguished.

A limited edition is normally hand signed and numbered by the artist, typically in pencil, in the form (e.g.) 14/100. The first number is the number of the print itself, and the second number is the number of overall prints the artist will print of that image. The lower the second number is, the more valuable and collectible the limited editions are likely to be. A small number of "artists' proofs" may also be produced as well, signed and with "AP", "proof", etc. Prints that are given to someone or are for some reason unsuitable for sale are marked "H. C." or "H/C", meaning hors de commerce ('not for sale').

== Music ==
In terms of musical albums, the term "deluxe edition" refers to a re-release of an album, generally a sufficient period after the initial release, featuring extra content related to the album. From the 2000s it has become commonplace for a deluxe edition to be released at the same time as the standard edition. The deluxe edition often includes some or all of the following: extra tracks; demo recordings of album tracks; live recordings of album tracks; alternate takes, mixes, or edits of album tracks; B-sides from album singles that did not appear on the album; DVD content, including music videos. These editions are commonly repackaged, with the new content on a second disc and many feature additional liner notes.

Also, some albums are initially released in two editions, a regular retail version and a "special" or "limited" version in distinctive packaging and often including extras such as a second disc, a video DVD, or liner notes expanded into a hardback book. Generally, the special package is only produced for the first pressing or a set number of copies - some are limited to only being sold at one chain of retailers. It is important to distinguish this from an expanded re-release, since those are generally available widely and for a long period of time.

== Double-dipping ==
Double-dipping refers to the practice of releasing multiple editions of the same product (usually a CD, DVD, or Blu-ray), simultaneously or at different times, with the purpose of enticing consumers to buy more than one edition. This can be done with, for example, a special edition, a director's cut, an ultimate edition, and a collector's edition, sometimes with different features or supplementary material. The consumer may be persuaded to purchase multiple editions, with the belief that the additional features or content will be worth paying for a product that is largely equivalent to one already owned.

== Fast food and consumer goods ==
Fast food restaurants may offer "limited time only" (LTO) or "seasonal" items, also intended to boost sales via invented scarcity and the framing effect. LTO items may be a collaboration with an athlete, musical artist (e.g. Travis Scott and McDonald's), or influencer; a seasonal-themed release (the pumpkin spice latte); a tie-in promotion with another property; a re-release of previously-discontinued products; or an item featuring unusual flavors or colors. The trend expanded in the early 2020s from an occasional LTO seasonal promotion or exclusive item (e.g. the McRib) to a constant rotation of new offerings from an increasing number of chains. An LTO also lets a company test new product ideas more quickly and with less risk than a permanent change. Some restaurants may even re-brand an entire location as a sales event, such as Starbucks creating a "Starbies" pop-up at an existing store in Nashville to promote Taylor Swift's The Life of a Showgirl. Some flavor combinations may be purposefully strange in order to attract attention (such as KFC's "Chizza", a "pizza" with fried chicken instead of bread).

Snack manufacturers such as Lay's have also introduced LTO flavors, and the concept has also been employed by various consumer goods producers. Some LTO products may operate across a longer time frame, such as Lego sets, which "retire" after a number of years in production.

The video game Fortnite Battle Royale features LTO skins and "emotes" which are only available during a specific in-game event or season.

=== Cards ===
Many collectible card games and trading card product lines feature cards produced in varying amounts (called "print runs"). Aside from regular "unlimited" editions which may be reprinted in the future, smaller runs range from cards with thousands of copies to unique "1 of 1" cards. These systems use a variety of terms to indicate different levels of rarity (e.g. fixed, common, uncommon, rare, super-, ultra-, mythic-, exclusive). Sticker album producer Panini Group began printing its stickers in a variety of editions called "parallels" featuring different-colored borders.

== See also ==
- Artist's multiple
- Box sets
- Director's cut
