= Mat (picture framing) =

Thin, flat piece of paper-based material included within a picture frame

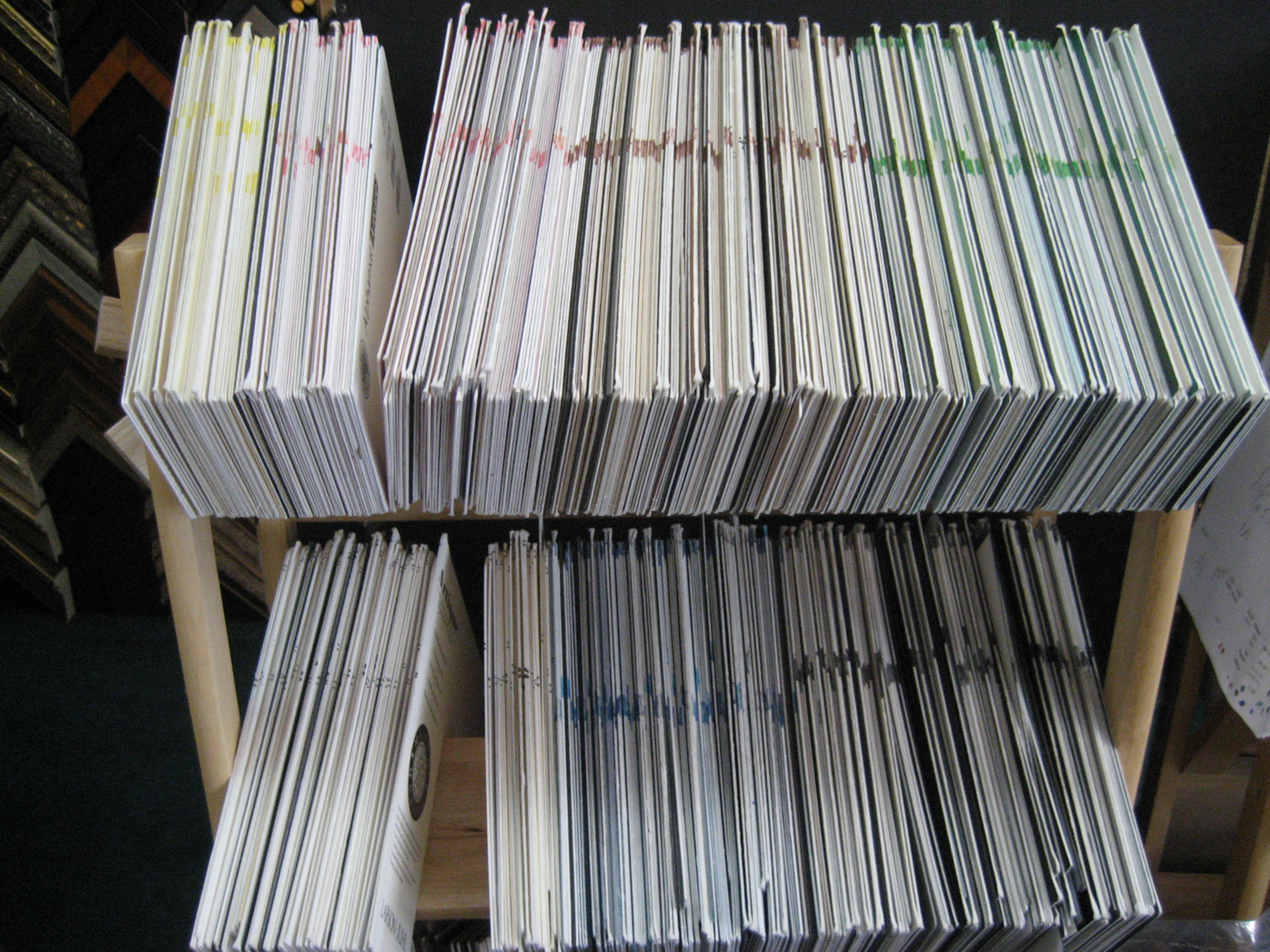
Mats are available in a wide variety of colors and styles; this rack includes several hundred corner samples

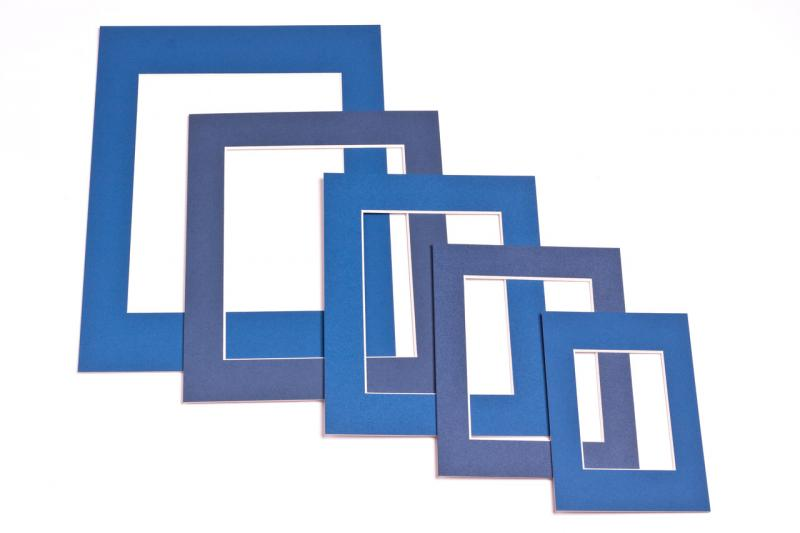
A passe-partout, put between the picture and frame, protects the picture and changes its visual appearance.

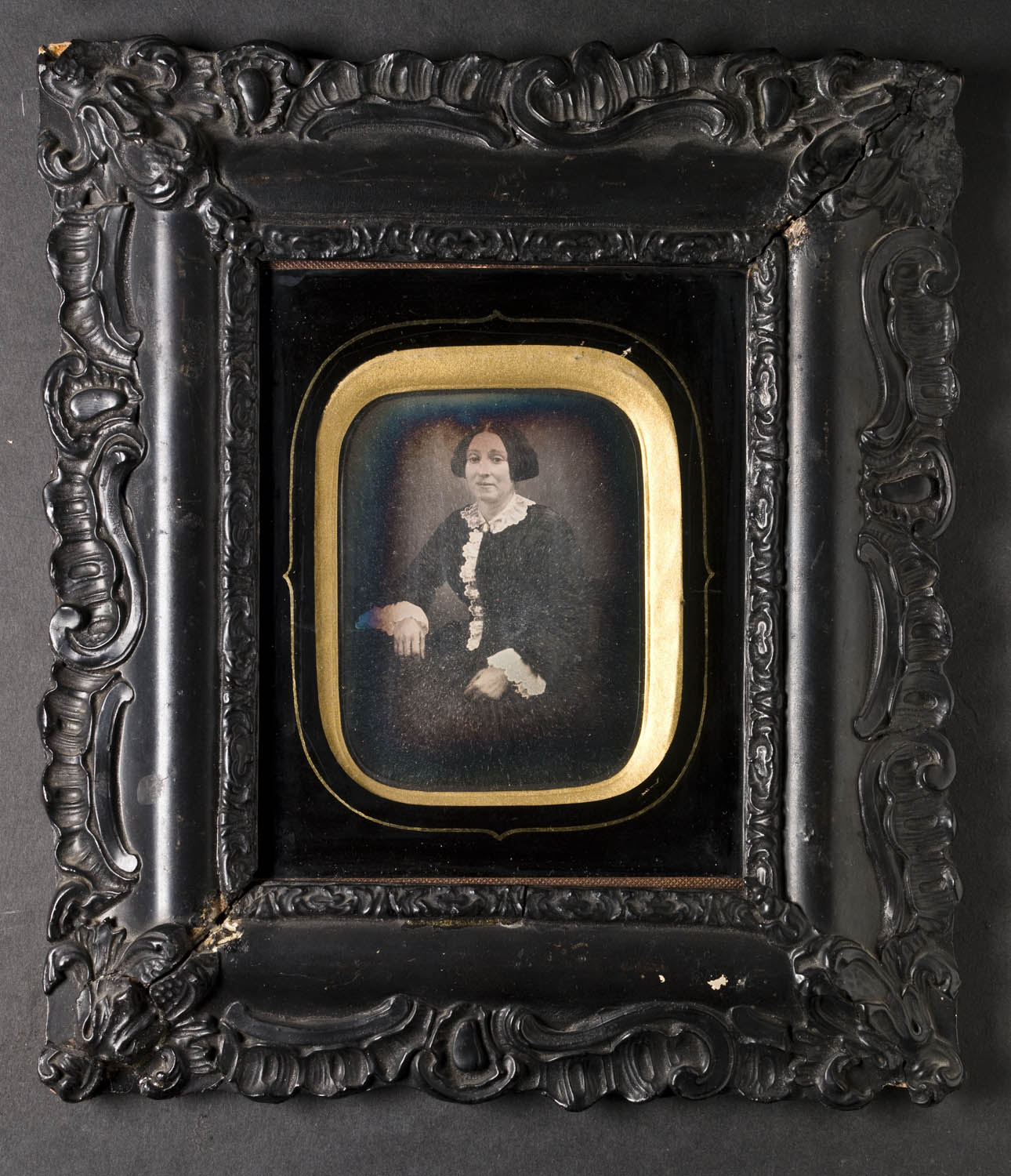
A framed daguerreotype surrounded by a passe-partout

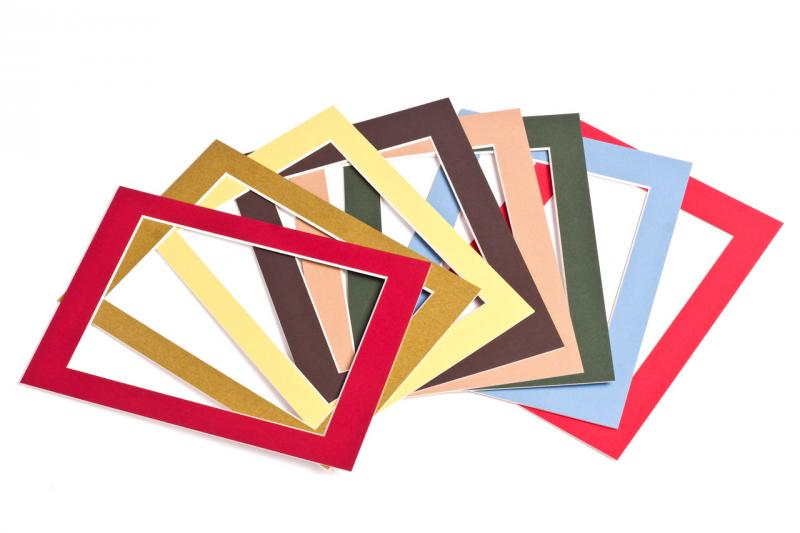
Passe-partout

In the picture framing industry, a mat (or matte, or mount in British English) is a thin, flat piece of paper-based material included within a picture frame, which serves as additional decoration and to perform several other, more practical functions, such as separating the art from the glass. Putting mats in a frame is called matting, a term which can also usually be used interchangeably with mat. The French term, occasionally used in English, is passe-partout, also spelled as passepartout. A picture (a photo or print, drawing, etc.) is placed beneath it, with the cutout framing it. The passe-partout serves two purposes: first, to prevent the image from touching the glass, and second, to frame the image and enhance its visual appeal. The cutout in the passe-partout is usually beveled to avoid casting shadows on the picture. The French word may also be used for the tape used to stick the back of the picture to its frame.

== Functions ==
=== Decoration ===
The picture-framing mat is most commonly known by laymen for its use as additional decoration to enhance the look of a framed piece, sometimes in conjunction with a fillet or more rarely, liners made of wooden moulding with a cloth surface. Although matting usually contains only one opening per layer, it may contain none if a picture is "float-mounted" or "top-mounted" (placed on top of the mat), and mats with two or more exist, more commonly with photography of the family or pictures of individual family members type than other types of artwork. Typically the mat or mats, if matched carefully and properly proportioned, serve to help draw the eye in towards the framed piece, or towards a particular key element of the piece. However, while the mat is usually regarded as something to complement or set off the artwork to best effect, or not to interfere or compete with it (neutral-colored mats are often preferred by high-end art galleries,) there are some examples of the mat being regarded by the artist as a part of the artwork. Mats can be decorated as described below, used as a surface for the continuation of the artwork within, or can incorporate three-dimensional aspects, though the last two are highly unusual.

Mats are fairly adaptable in the visual sense. Since they are typically quite thin (American-made mats are usually 1/16 of an inch thick, for example), they are able to be cut to "stack" inside of a display, allowing for double, triple or quadruple matting, or even allowing for a fillet in between mats. Mats are available in numerous colors and shades and, less commonly, in preprinted patterns or designs. Mats can easily be found or altered to include further decorative features, such as a cloth covering (most commonly linen or silk, though mats with leather coverings or various other types of cloth covering are also available from some companies) or other decorative coverings or coatings (such as metallic coatings, or textured and patterned coatings that can include rice paper).

Because the mat is thin, but not razor-thin, it can also be carved (traditionally by hand, though computerized mat-cutting systems have also been developed), to feature a design, such as lettering or a simple image; since the carving consists mainly of cutting away a small portion of the top decorative layer of the mat, this means that the carved design will show up as the color of the mat's core. (There have been examples of sandpaper being used to sand into the mat and reveal the core, or incisions made into it with the same result.) Most mats are available with a white core, black core, or standard (cream colored) core, but a handful of mats are also available with bright green, red, yellow or blue cores.

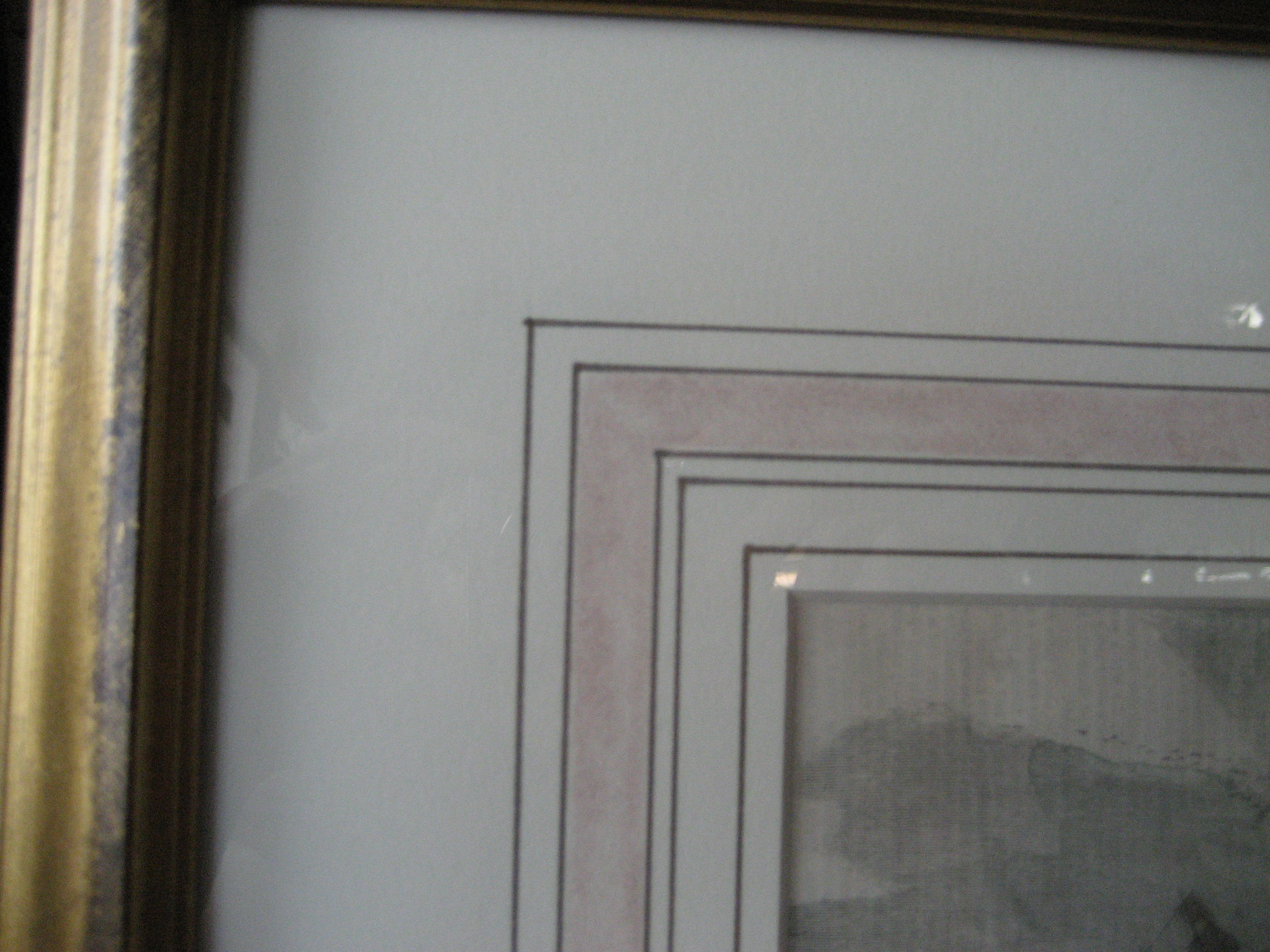
A mat with several French lines and a watercolor panel.

While most mats are generally rectangular in shape, with a rectangular opening, in addition to fairly common oval, oval-apertured mats designed to go with oval frames, there are also very unusual examples of mats in other shapes.

Mats are, with very few exceptions, made of paper-based material. They tend to take well to minor surface additions, including ink and paint (a very wide variety of other media, including fumage, have been used); cloth-covered mats can also have objects such as pins, flags or cloth patches pinned or sewn to them, a technique frequently used in shadowboxing to avoid having to glue items to the backing. It is also possible to affix a small metal plate to the surface of a mat. Such plates are typically made of brass, and can also be affixed to the picture frame itself if the frame is made of wood.

A common form of decoration on non-cloth coated mats is the French line or line, and the French panel or panel. These forms of matting may also be called French mats. A French line or line is a line drawn on the mat, usually in ink or paint and usually drawn to form a complete rectangle or square around the opening in the mat. It is used as additional decoration to help draw the eye in towards the center of the display, and can be done in pencil or any color of ink or paint, including metallic inks. A French panel or panel is similar to a French line, with the exception that it is thicker, formed from decorative material ranging from gold leaf to a design in ink or paint. Typically a painted French panel will be done in watercolor, which is also sometimes referred to as a watercolor panel.

Similar to a French line, is a v-groove. A v-groove is a thin cut into the mat around the edge of the opening, revealing the core. It is used for much the same purpose as the French line.

The most common used matting has an equal margin all the way around. On artwork with the visual center lower than actual center. Bottom weighting, or off-sets are used frequently in matting. The bottom margin are made larger than the side and top margins. When looking at an image, the eyes tend to center higher up than the physical center of the image. By creating a larger bottom margin and off-setting the mat you draw the eye to physical center of the image. "Top center" is a subset of bottom weighting where the top and side margins are equal, which creates a visually pleasing effect. This is particularly true in mats where the borders are not equal, such as an 11x14 with an 8x10 opening.

=== Protection ===
In archival or conservation picture framing, mats have several important functions. One of the most important functions is that it separates the glass from the art or document being framed; this is primarily important because any condensation that develops on the inside of the glass can be transferred to the piece if they are not separated, resulting in water damage, mold or mildew. Photos should also be separated from the glass because the surface of photographs is particularly easy to damage, and may even separate from its original paper and stick to the glass if wet; for this reason, any framed photograph of value should be framed in such a way that the glass does not directly contact the photo. Additionally, some types of art, such as pastels or chalk pictures, can smudge easily and should be separated from the glass for that reason.

Another major function of the mat in archival framing (where the mats used are made of acid-free and lignin-free paper) comes into play during the mounting process. In archival framing, paper items are not typically glued down to the backing, as it prevents anyone in the future from being able to safely and easily remove it to replace damaged frames, backing or mats, and can make restoration of a damaged document or art piece more difficult. Typically, such items are instead held in place against the backing with mylar "photo corners" (tiny triangular pockets into which the corners of the paper are put). The added (though slight) weight of mats can help hold a piece in place while also helping to hide the backing and photo corners. In archival framing, the mats are not glued to the piece or backing, but are "hinged" to the backing with tape, though if more than one mat is used, the mats are typically glued to each other.

== Acidic vs. "acid-free" ==
There are two main types of mat material: acidic, and "acid-free" (neutral pH). Older mats (wood based paper) are typically acidic, because acid-free paper was not widely available or marketed until recent years. While most newer mats are acid-free, there are some papers that contain acid and one should ask the picture framer about the acid content of the mats if the desired life of the piece being framed is more than 75–100 years.

The difference is important for the long term protection of the piece because acidic mats can cause what is called mat burn, brown marks that creep in from the outside onto the displayed piece itself. While mat burn is sometimes reversible through cleaning the piece, cleaning may not be feasible if the piece was executed in water-soluble inks or paints, such as watercolor. Thus, it is important to know if the mats used are acid-free if the piece is to be preserved for a long time.

To determine the pH of an older mat with a white core, look to see if the core (visible where the mat has already been cut) has turned brownish or yellowed; if so, it is acidic. If the core has not changed color, one can determine the pH by using a pH tester.

There are several categories of mat board and they are all separated by the level of protection offered the art work or artifact being framed. While some say that acidic framing materials should be avoided for all but the most temporary frames, it is not safe to say that all "acid-free" mats are recommended for long term preservation use. The hierarchy of mat board quality is as follows:

1. Museum board – The highest quality material available. It is constructed of 100% cotton fiber, is "archival" and will protect and preserve the contents of a frame. While it is the most expensive material available, the difference in actual material costs relative to the cost of framing is minimal.
2. Museum mat or rag mat – Still a good quality choice for conservation, it is constructed of cotton linters (short cotton fibers) and cellulose (wood pulp) middles. The cellulose is a less expensive raw material but offers sufficient conservation properties for most works.
3. Conservation or archival mat board – Constructed of 100% pure high alpha cellulose (wood pulp) and treated to be inert for up to 300 years. This is the highest quality paper matboard available.
4. Acid-free or acid free lined – This material usually has a recycled fiber core, lined with a wood-based liner on one or both sides that has been treated to prevent "short term" acid burn. Eventually the acid in the core will leach out to the surface, which can harm the artwork.

Caution must be exercised in selecting the type of framing desired. Art work that is desired to last long term (more than 75 years) can be damaged by improper mat boards that are used intentionally to lower cost. However, non-archival quality mat boards may be suitable for a photographic print, laser print, etc. that is not meant to last long term. Additionally, prints made with traditional chemical processing of photographic film (i.e. dark room development), as opposed to computer printing, are already slightly acidic by nature and therefore are much less likely to be damaged by non-archival mats.

In addition, correct "conservation" framing includes all components, not just the mat board used directly behind the glass. Until recently, there were no truly "archival"-quality foamcore boards available, though a number of foamcore brands exist with buffered surfaces and the Nielsen Bainbridge company now produces one that is claimed to both block the intrusion of airborne pollutants and to avoid the problem of outgassing that non-archival foamboards may fall prey to; for this reason, and due to many smaller frames' shallow depths, it is not uncommon to see mat boards used as backing for a picture frame as well, though foamcore and mounting boards tend to be stiffer. It is also important, if long-term preservation is of concern, to make sure the framer is using good conservation framing technique.

== Technology ==
Specially shaped mats for CD or LP records

Mats can be cut using computerized mat cutters. These come in a range of sizes and allow mats to be cut with accuracy and precision. This makes it ideal for complex mats, multi-window mats, oval or shaped mats or even bulk mat cutting.

Mats (also known as mounts) can also be cut by hand, but this introduces the possibility of human error. Unless specified, the aperture will usually be cut 3 mm over the aperture size, allowing the artwork to sit inside the mat. It is common practice for a backing board to be applied to the back in order to secure the artwork, prior to framing.

== See also ==
- Archival
- Fillet (picture framing)
- Foamcore
- Photograph
- Picture frame
- Picture framing glass
- Printmaking
- Professional Picture Framers Association
