= Photo Marketing Association =

The Photo Marketing Association International (PMA) International Convention and Trade Show was an annual imaging technology trade show conducted by PMA held in Las Vegas. Since 2012, the show has been branded as PMA@CES, reflecting its rescheduling to coincide with the Consumer Electronics Show, a major annual consumer electronics trade show also held in Las Vegas.

The PMA International Convention and Trade Show is frequently the occasion for the public introduction of important imaging products. The major competition for this trade show is Photokina, held in even-numbered years in Cologne, Germany.

In 2012, PMA announced it would launch an online community known as The Big Photo Show, with associated trade shows under that banner in the U.S. The first such show was held in Los Angeles in May 2013, with another scheduled for that city in May 2014. Unlike PMA@CES, which is restricted exclusively to trade visitors, The Big Photo Show is specifically intended for consumers.

PMA has seven member associations: Association of Imaging Executives, Digital Imaging Marketing Association, National Association of Photo Equipment Technicians, Photo Imaging Education Association, Professional Picture Framers Association PPFA, Professional School Photographers Association and Sports Photographers Association of America.

== Shows ==
=== PMA and PMA@CES ===
| Year | Dates |
|---|---|
| 1979 | March 25 – March 28, Chicago |
| 1981 | Early April, Miami |
| 1982 | February 17 – February 21, Las Vegas |
| 1987 | February 2 – February 25, Chicago |
| 2000 | February 3 – February 6 |
| 2001 | February 11 – February 14, Orlando |
| 2002 | February 24 – February 27, Orlando |
| 2004 | February 12 – February 15 |
| 2005 | February 20 – February 23 |
| 2006 | February 26 – March 1 |
| 2007 | March 8 – March 11 |
| 2008 | January 31 – February 2 |
| 2009 | March 3 – March 5 |
| 2010 | February 21 – February 23 |
| 2012 | January 10 – January 13 |
| 2013 | January 8 – January 11 |
| 2014 | January 7 – January 10 |
| 2015 | January 6 – January 9 |

=== The Big Photo Show ===
| Year | Dates |
|---|---|
| 2013 | May 4 – May 5 |
| 2014 | May 17 – May 18 |
