= PPFA =

PPFA may refer to:

- Planned Parenthood (Planned Parenthood Federation of America, PPFA)
- Professional Picture Framers Association
