= Closed-cell PVC foamboard =

Lightweight rigid material

Closed-cell PVC foamboard is a lightweight rigid material used primarily in the manufacture of signs and displays. It is considered robust for outdoor use, being immune to rain and resistant to wind and sunlight.

== History ==
In 1912, the first patents for polyvinyl chloride (PVC) were filed in Britain and Germany. It was not until the early 1930s that PVC was able to be produced cheaply, limiting its marketable applications for the time. World War II helped make the substance popular, as manufacturers used it to make an assortment of items for soldiers. It was here that PVC's water resistance was shown to be an important property, and tools made from PVC were used in many marine applications. After the war, PVC was not a popular choice of materials in the marine industry due to its density. In the 1970s, the need for a strong, moisture-resistant material led to plastic manufactures working with PVC to make it lighter. This led to the creation of PVC foamboard, by combining PVC with polyurea at the molecular level.

== Processing ==
PVC foamboard is made up of an interpenetrating polymer network between PVC and polyurea. Now, the manufacturing process has become much more involved. First, polyvinyl chloride and polyurea are mixed together under controlled conditions. The mixture is then dispensed into a mold (commonly square as to make the foamboards). The filled mold is sealed by clamping the sides shut and then put into a large press where it is heated. After, a slab of solid material emerges from the mold. The material then undergoes a hot bath in order to expand it to a final density and is cured. The material is then ready to be cut into sheets of varying sizes and thickness, depending on purchaser requirements.

== Properties ==
PVC foamboard is distinct from the extra-lightweight foamcore board, laminated of foam and card surfaces, used for indoor signage and modelling. Like PVC, closed-cell PVC foamboard is solid and has a very rigid structure. Where it differs is in its closed-cell foam structure, which makes it very light (as little as half the weight of solid PVC), highly resistant to moisture and some chemicals, and very easy to cut and shape. It also has thermoplastic properties, and begins to soften at around 65 °C (149 °F). Typically, closed-cell PVC foamboard can be cut as easily as wood, softened and shaped by immersing in boiling water or with a standard heat gun, and painted with standard automobile paints. In addition, Closed-cell PVC foamboard is made up of polarized molecules otherwise known as dipoles.

It has a very low moisture absorption. The mixture of polyvinyl chloride and polyurea has a good bond strength. Closed-cell PVC foam takes solid shape due to its linear structure. However, due to this structure, it is more brittle than open-celled PVC foam. It is available in densities varying from 3 to 25 pounds per cubic foot (0.048 to 0.400 g/cm^{3}). It has a low flammability rate. A universal cross-linked closed-cell PVC that was used in a comparison with three heat-resistant cross-linked had a glass temperature of 83.2 °C. However, there are issues using PVC that can affect one's health and safety when in use.

== Common uses ==
Closed-cell PVC foamboard is mainly used for industrial and manufacturing purposes. The material is primarily used in the manufacturing of signs and displays which are used for promotion ads, as well as road signs. Its appealing material properties have made it popular among the makers of scale models and theatrical props. Builders who create yachts and composites used for experimental aircraft are typically found using PVC foamboard. This type of PVC foamboard is well resistant to weather and sunlight, and can thus be used to protect other, more damage-prone products.

== Issues ==
One drawback to PVC materials is that hot working them produces noxious fumes containing hydrochloric acid and potentially even dioxins. These are a respiratory hazard in a workshop, and the acid fumes are so serious that they may damage equipment. Some heat-based processes, notably laser cutting, are generally considered impossible, owing to the equipment risk. Where PVC materials are cut by laser, this is a highly specialized process requiring adapted machines and acid-specific fume extraction and filtering.
