= Fine Art Trade Guild =

The Fine Art Trade Guild is an organisation representing the fine art and framing industry. Based in London, the Guild operates primarily in the United Kingdom and Ireland, also in a smaller capacity in New Zealand.

== History ==
The first fine art trade association or guild was the Printsellers' Association, founded in 1847. The Fine Art Trade Guild was founded in 1910 and represents members as well as assuming the purpose of its predecessor in trying to "preserve the integrity of the limited edition print". More recently Colin Ruffell was the first artist to be elected as Master of the Guild in 2008, serving in this role for two years.

The guild celebrated its Centenary in 2010.

== Role ==
The guild sets standards and guidelines for prints and picture framing.

The guild also acts as a regulatory body and has established ethics and operative standards for its members, as well as providing information for customers who buy art or framing services.

== Membership ==
The guild's membership comprises mainly galleries and framers, but it also represents artists.

== Notable members ==
In 2014 Jorge Aguilar-Agon was awarded the Lifetime Achievement Award and given an honorary membership of the Fine Art Trade Guild in recognition of his long service to the guild and his lifelong career as a professional artist.

== See also ==
- Giclée
- Framing
- Professional Picture Framers Association
