= Jorge Aguilar-Agon =

Spanish painter (1936–2020)

Jorge Aguilar-Agon BAgr, AEA, AAPB, FRSA
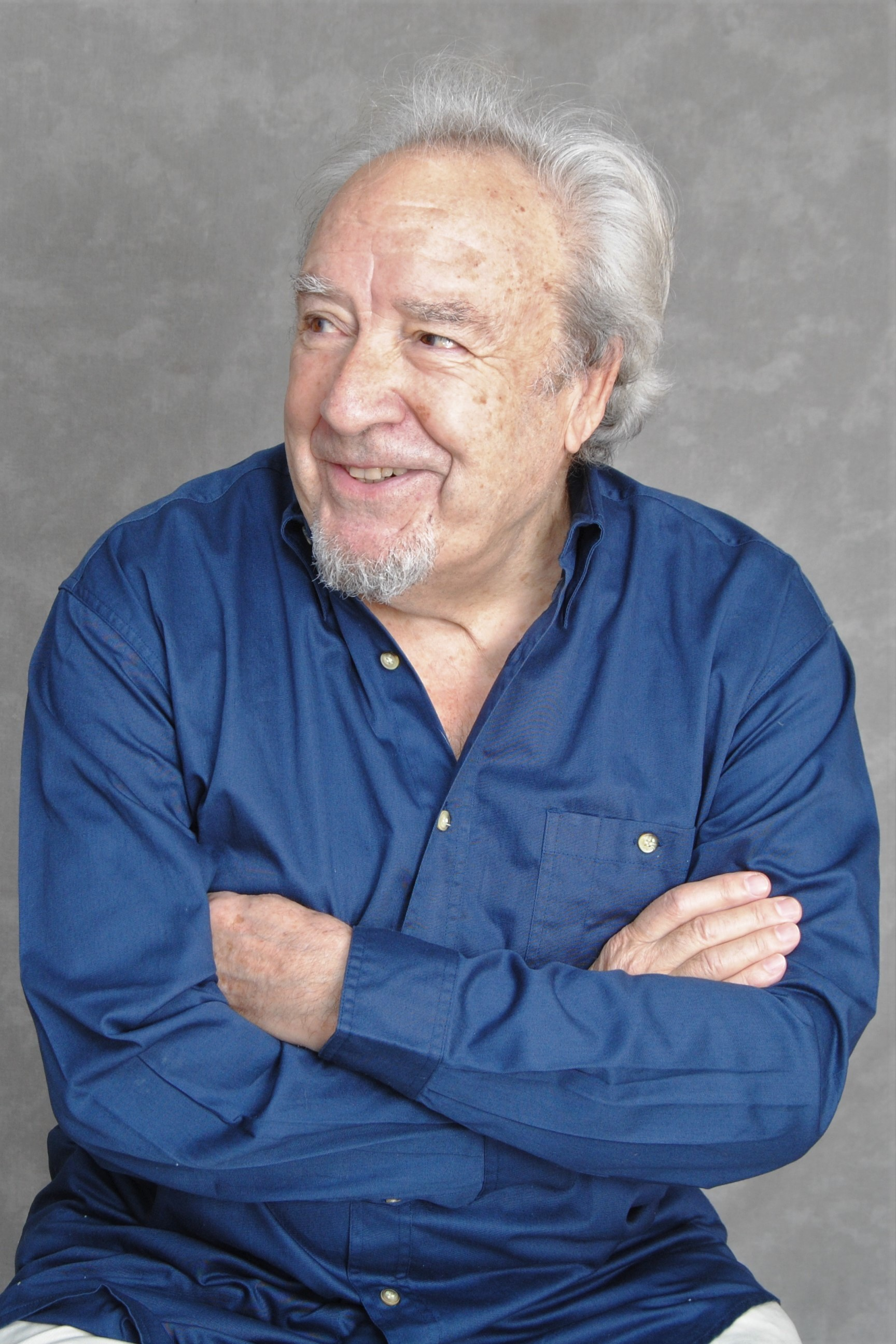
- Born: July 27, 1936; Barcelona, Spain
- Died: September 27, 2020 (aged 94)
- Known for: Founder member of the European Academy of Arts
- Style: Impressionist with surrealist influences
- Movement: Romanticism
- Awards: Lifetime Achievement Award; 2014 Fine Art Trade Guild
- Website: jorgeaguilar-agon.com

Jorge Aguilar-Agon (27 July 1936 – 25 September 2020) was a Spanish contemporary romantic impressionist painter. He was born in Barcelona in 1936 and worked from studios in France, Spain and England.

== Biography ==
Jorge Aguilar-Agon was born in Barcelona in 1936, at the start of the Spanish Civil War. After attaining a university degree in agriculture, he left Spain for Germany and mixed with the bohemian circles of the Schwabinger Kunstkreis in Munich. He later moved on to France where he lived for a time in Montmartre and St Germain des Pres in Paris.

His first exhibition was held at the Medici Society in London. He has since had 10 world tours and over 182 individual exhibitions. His paintings are now represented in private collections and museums all over the world and citations appear in several notable reference journals.

He worked from studios in France, Spain and England.

He spoke seven languages fluently and was a regular contributor to radio and television art programmes.

== Style ==
Aguilar-Agon's style was romantic impressionist. He described being influenced initially by the Catalan Impressionist and European Surrealist movements, and subsequently by Parisian and German bohemian societies.

He specialised in landscapes, seascapes and still life.

== Awards and recognition ==
Jorge Aguilar-Agon held the following appointments:

- Life Fellowship of the Royal Society of Arts (since 1980)
- Director of the Fine Art Trade Guild
- Chevalier Ancient Order of the Academie Europeanne des Arts (Paris)

In 2014 Jorge Aguilar-Agon was awarded the Lifetime Achievement Award and given an honorary membership of the Fine Art Trade Guild in recognition of his long service to the Guild and his lifelong career as a professional artist.

== Memberships ==
Aguilar-Agon was a member of the following institutions:

- European Academy of Arts
- Royal Association of Belgian Artists
- Society and Council of European Art and of Aesthetics
- Spanish Association of Artists, Painters and Sculptors
- New Zealand Academy of Fine Arts
