= Dutch metal =

Form of brass

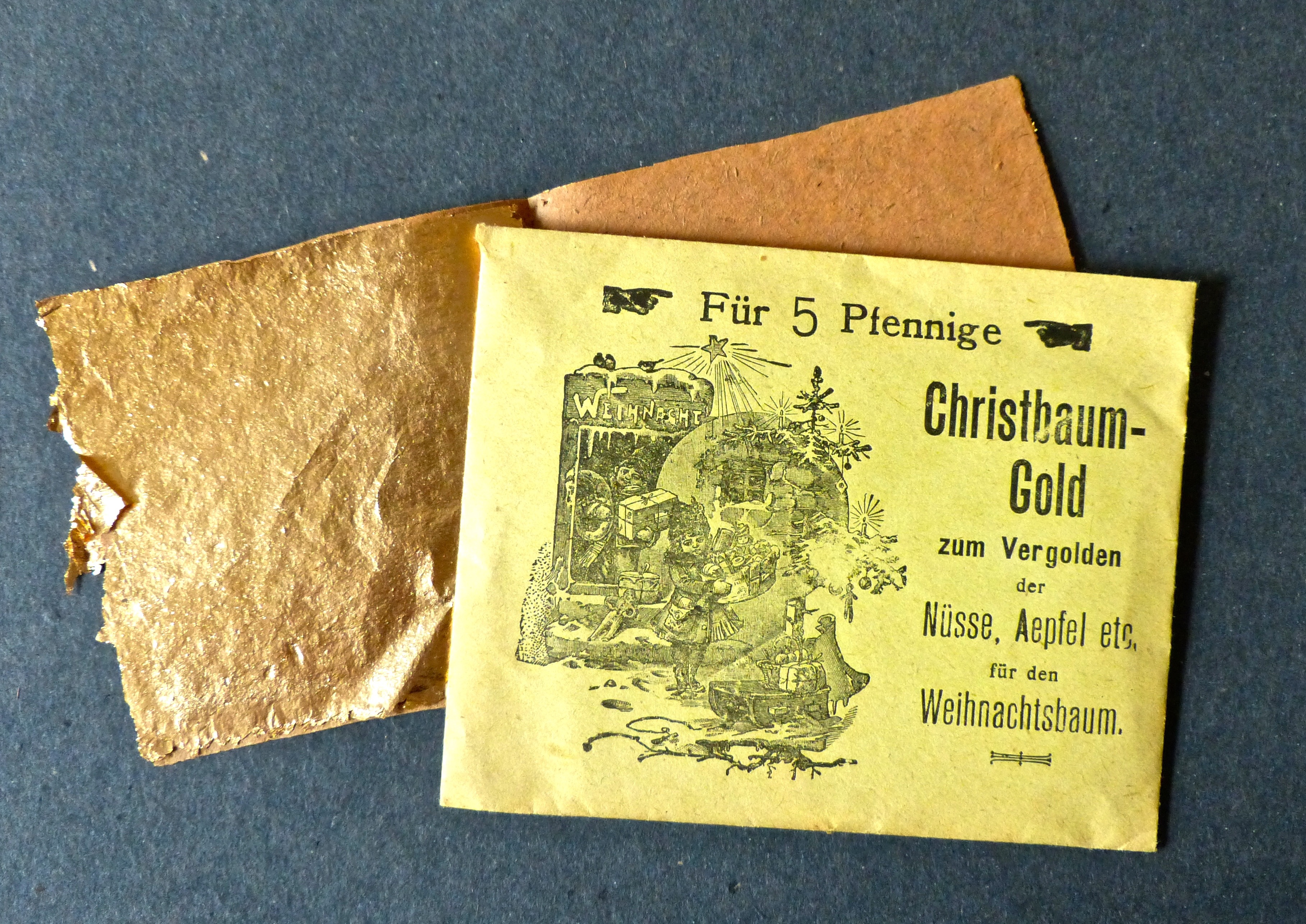
German packet of Dutch metal in foil form, early 20th-century

Dutch metal is a form of brass. The alloy typically consists of 85–88% copper and the remainder being zinc. It is also known by other names such as "composition gold leaf", "Dutch gold", "Schlagmetal" and "Schlag leaf".

It is very malleable and ductile and so can be beaten into very thin sheets. These sheets are sold for use as metal leaf or imitation gold leaf. The addition of arsenic produces an alloy with similar properties but coloured white.

== See also ==
- Metal leaf
- Gold leaf
