= Fillet (picture framing) =

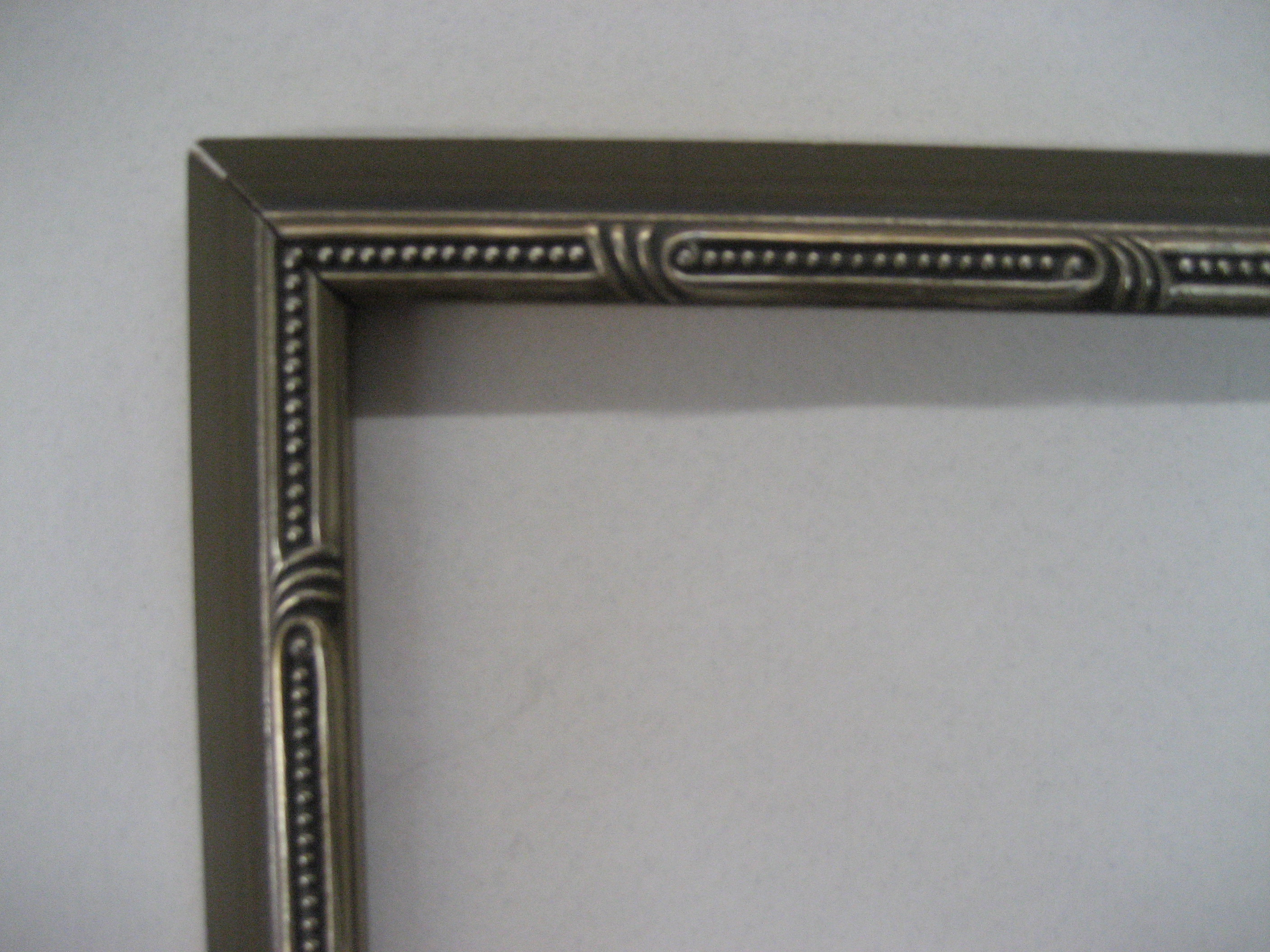
A fillet corner sample. Note the flat "lip".

In the picture framing industry, a fillet (also referred to as a slip) is a small piece of moulding which fits inside a larger frame or, typically, underneath or in between matting, used for decorative purposes. The picture framing term is probably related to, though not necessarily derived from, the engineering term, which it is frequently pronounced similarly to; however, unlike the use of fillets in mechanical engineering, the use of "fillets" in picture frames is wholly decorative.

== Pronunciation ==
Fillet can be pronounced in two ways. The other is similar to the French-derived culinary term. Either is acceptable in English, though most frame shops prefer one or the other pronunciation.

== Construction ==
Fillets are typically made of soft or hard wood, and feature a flat "lip" which can fit underneath a mat; the non-lip portion is what is displayed. Except for their shape and size (which is understandably small), fillets are constructed similarly to picture frames, usually from wood or polystyrene. One way is to pronounce it as if it were "fill-et" such as the cut of meat, as the similar term from mechanical engineering is pronounced. Metal fillets are very rare. Fillets are available in a number of styles and finishes, including gold and silver leaf finishes.

== Uses ==
The fillet is normally used as decoration in the lining of a picture frame or underneath a mat inside one; the intent is to help draw the eye inwards to the document being framed.

However, one can also use inverted fillets as form of picture frame on small, flat objects, as seen below:

An old greeting card, framed with an inverted fillet

In this case, the card was glued to the lip of the inverted fillet (which is thus hidden behind the back of the card).

Objects such as this that have been framed using inverted fillets can be backed and then affixed to wire for hanging, displayed on an easel, or used inside of a larger shadowbox display. Only very small, extremely flat objects can be framed using only an inverted fillet, as a fillet lacks the depth of a traditional picture frame, and due to its size, weight and construction, could not support a great amount of weight on its own.

== See also ==
- Picture frame
- Mat (picture framing)
