= Picture frame =

Protective and decorative edging for a picture

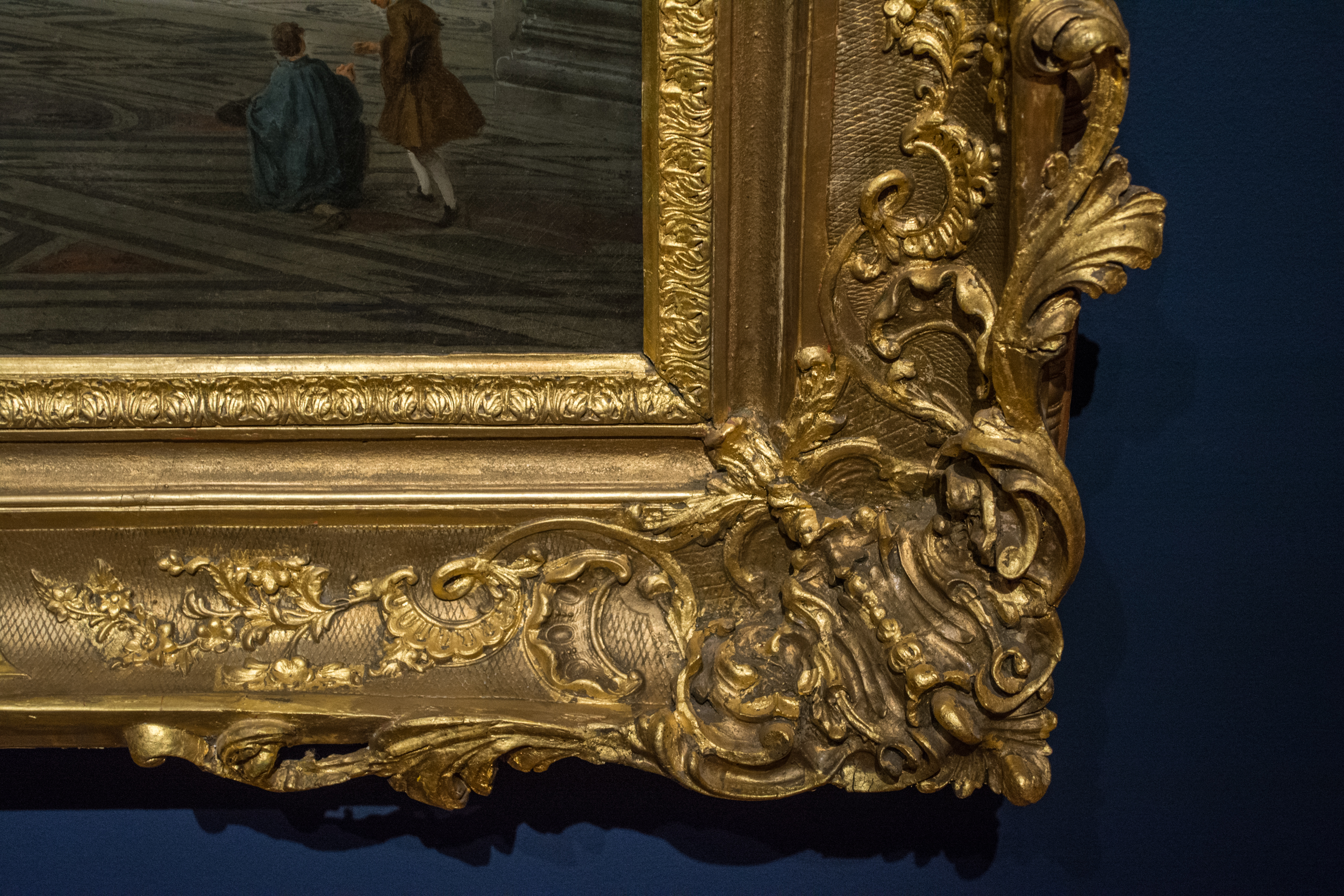
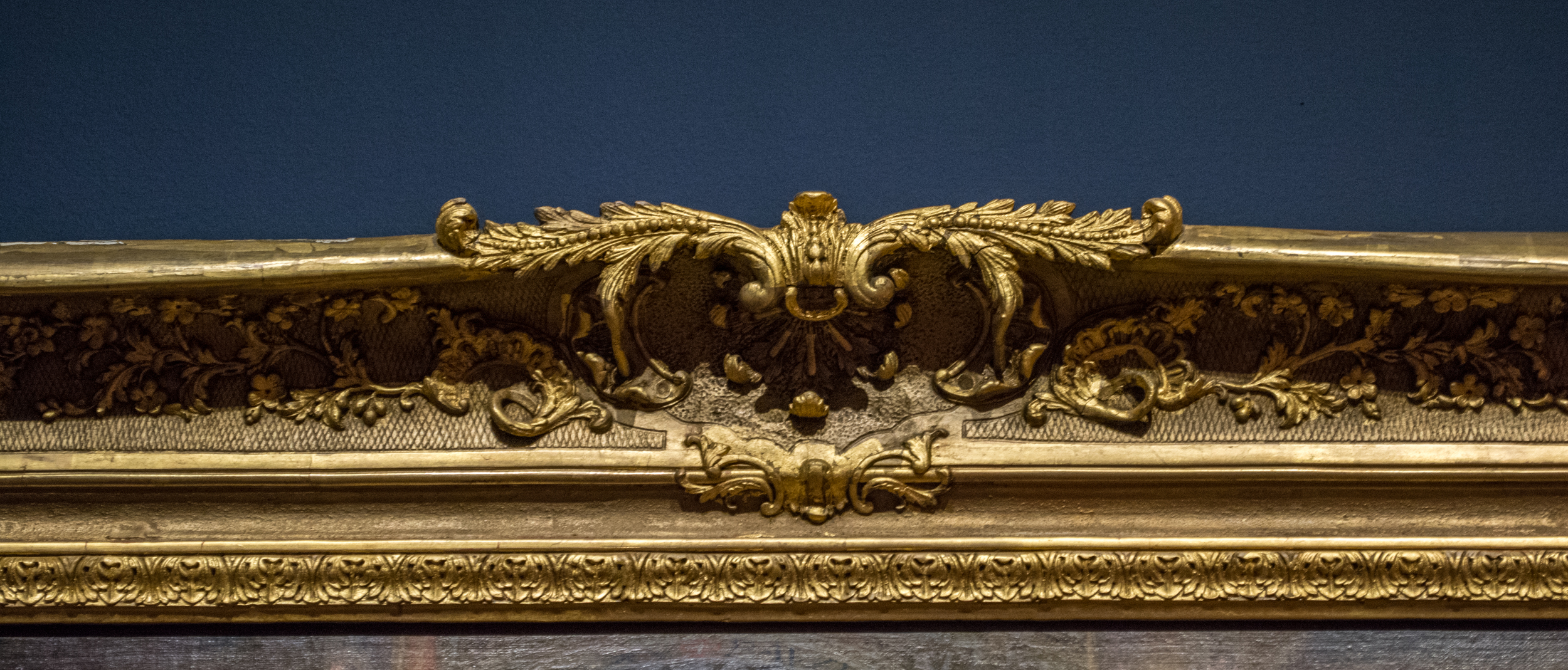
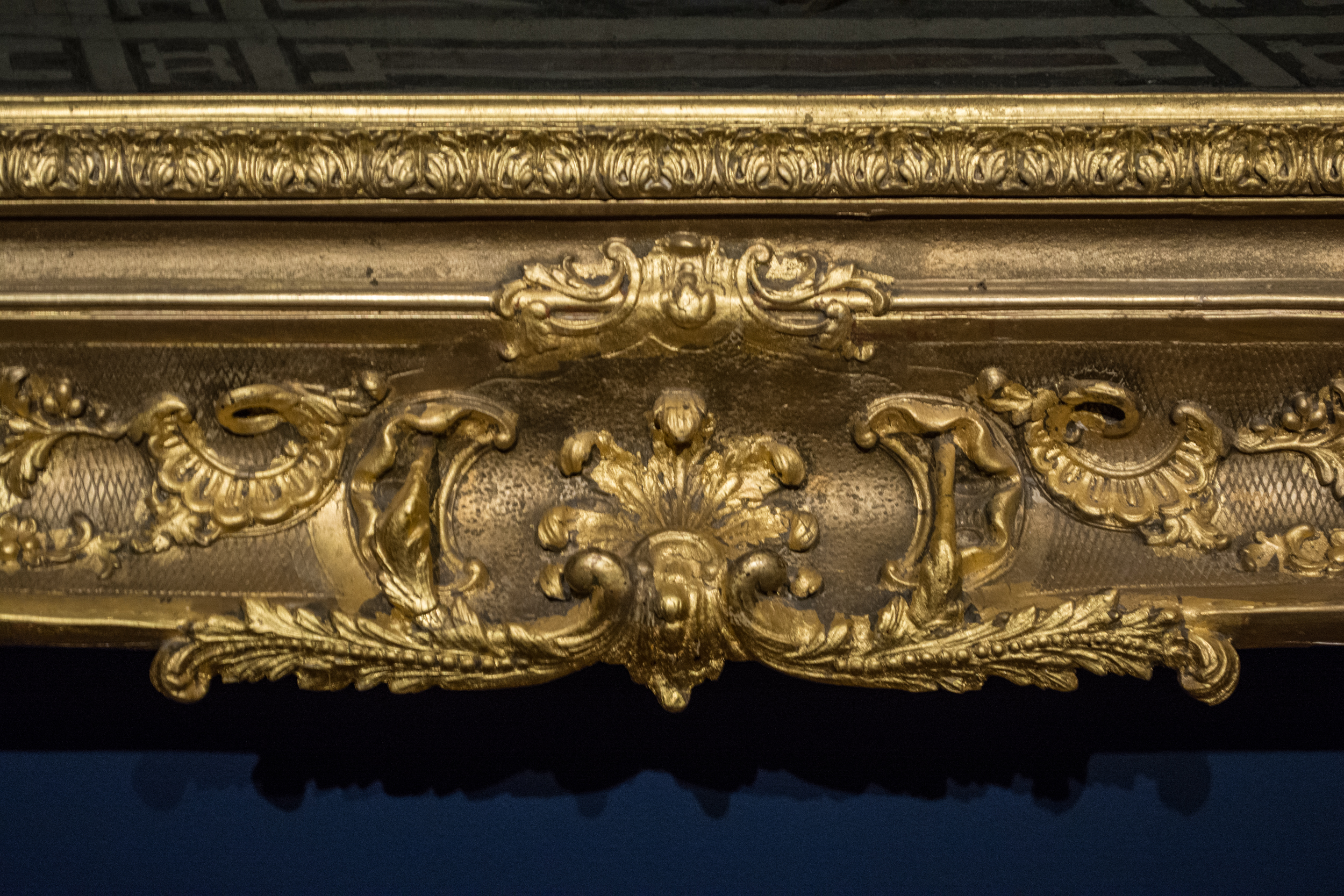
The elaborate decoration may be made by adhering molded plaster pieces to the wood base.

A picture frame is a protective and decorative edging for a picture, such as a painting or photograph. It makes displaying the work safer and easier and both sets the picture apart from its surroundings and aesthetically integrates it with them.

== Construction ==
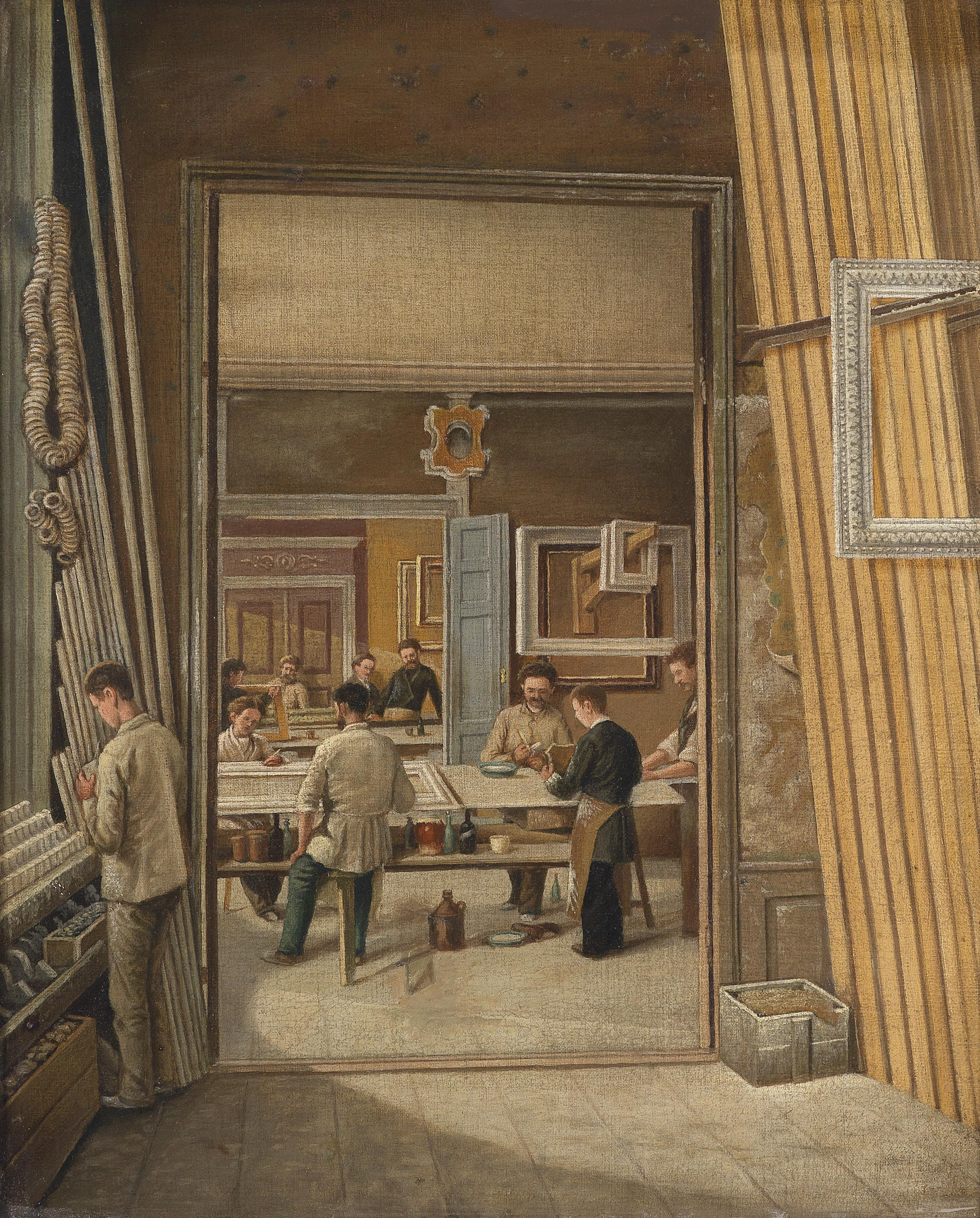
View of a frame-maker's workshop, oil on canvas, circa 1900

A picture frame is a container that borders the perimeter of a picture, and is used for the protection, display, and visual appreciation of objects and imagery such as photographs, canvas paintings, drawings and prints, posters, mirrors, shadow box memorabilia, and textiles.

Traditionally picture frames have been made of wood, and it remains very popular because wood frames can provide strength, be shaped in a broad range of profiles, and allow a variety of surface treatments. Other materials include metals, e.g. silver, bronze, aluminum, and stiff plastics such as polystyrene. A frame surface may be of any color or texture. Both genuine gilding and imitation gold remain popular, although many other surfaces are to be found in most framing establishments. Some picture frames have elaborate moldings, which may refer to the subject matter. Intricate decorations are often made of molded, then gilded plaster over a wood base. Picture frame mouldings come in a wide variety of profiles, generally in some sort of L shape with an upward "lip" and a horizontal rabbet. The rabbet functions as a shelf to hold the frame glazing (if any is to be used), some sort of spacer or mat/matte to keep the object safely behind the inner surface of the glazing, the object itself, and backing boards to protect the object from physical damage and environmental pollutants. The lip extends a proportionate distance up from the edge of the rabbet. It restrains materials in the frame and can be used to help set off or reveal the picture aesthetically.

The picture frame may contain a protective "glazing" of picture framing glass or acrylic glass such as Acrylite or Plexiglas. Framed watercolours and other works on paper (drawings and prints), are normally glazed, to protect their vulnerable surface. For other media, if the art in the frame is considered dispensable or if the exhibition environment is highly controlled, no glazing may be used. Since the 1980s significant advances have been made in the manufacture of picture glazings, creating a much broader range of options in both glass and acrylic products. Choosing which to use requires taking into account a variety of each object's characteristics: size, media used, condition of media, perceived value of object, anticipated use of the object, e.g. extended exhibition periods or travel. It is wise to consult an experienced art framer or conservator for help in making the better choice. Now, both picture framing glass and acrylic sheet are available with anti-reflective coatings to make the glazing virtually invisible under most lighting conditions. Except for pictures of only temporary interest, glazing should incorporate a filter to block almost all ultraviolet radiation (a UV filter) from penetrating the glazing. This filter slows the photocatalytic degradation of organic materials in the picture. Both glass and acrylic glazings are available with built-in anti-static properties. This option is necessary for objects with friable or degraded media, which would be pulled off the object and onto the glazing by static electric forces.

=== Shapes ===
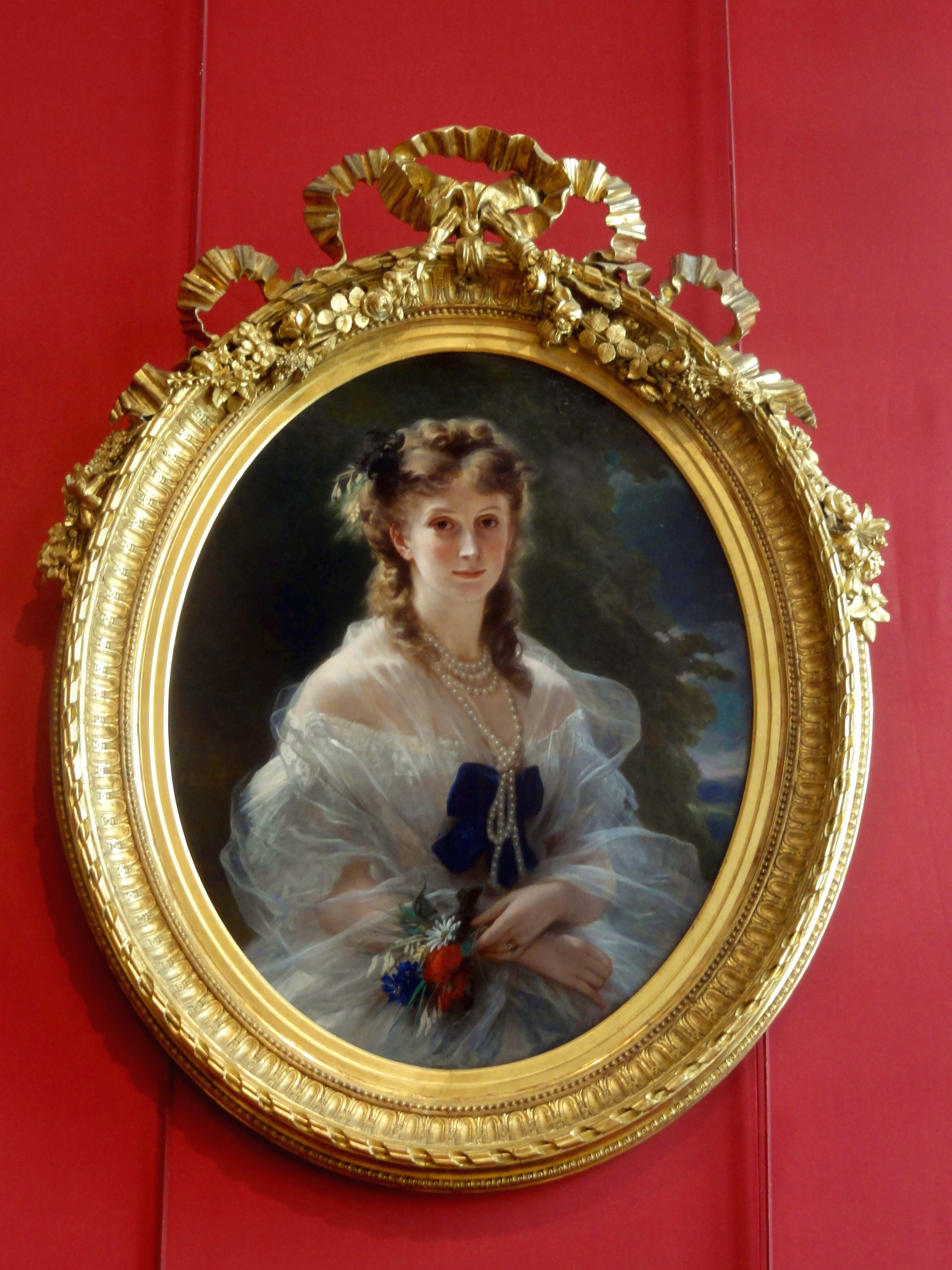
Round Second Empire frame

Picture frames are generally square or rectangular, though circular and oval frames are not uncommon. Frames in more unusual shapes such as football shapes, stars, hearts can be hand carved by a professional wood carver or carpenter (or possibly molded out of wood pulp). There are also picture frames designed to go around corners. A popular design is the scoop, an indent in the frame adding depth.

== History ==
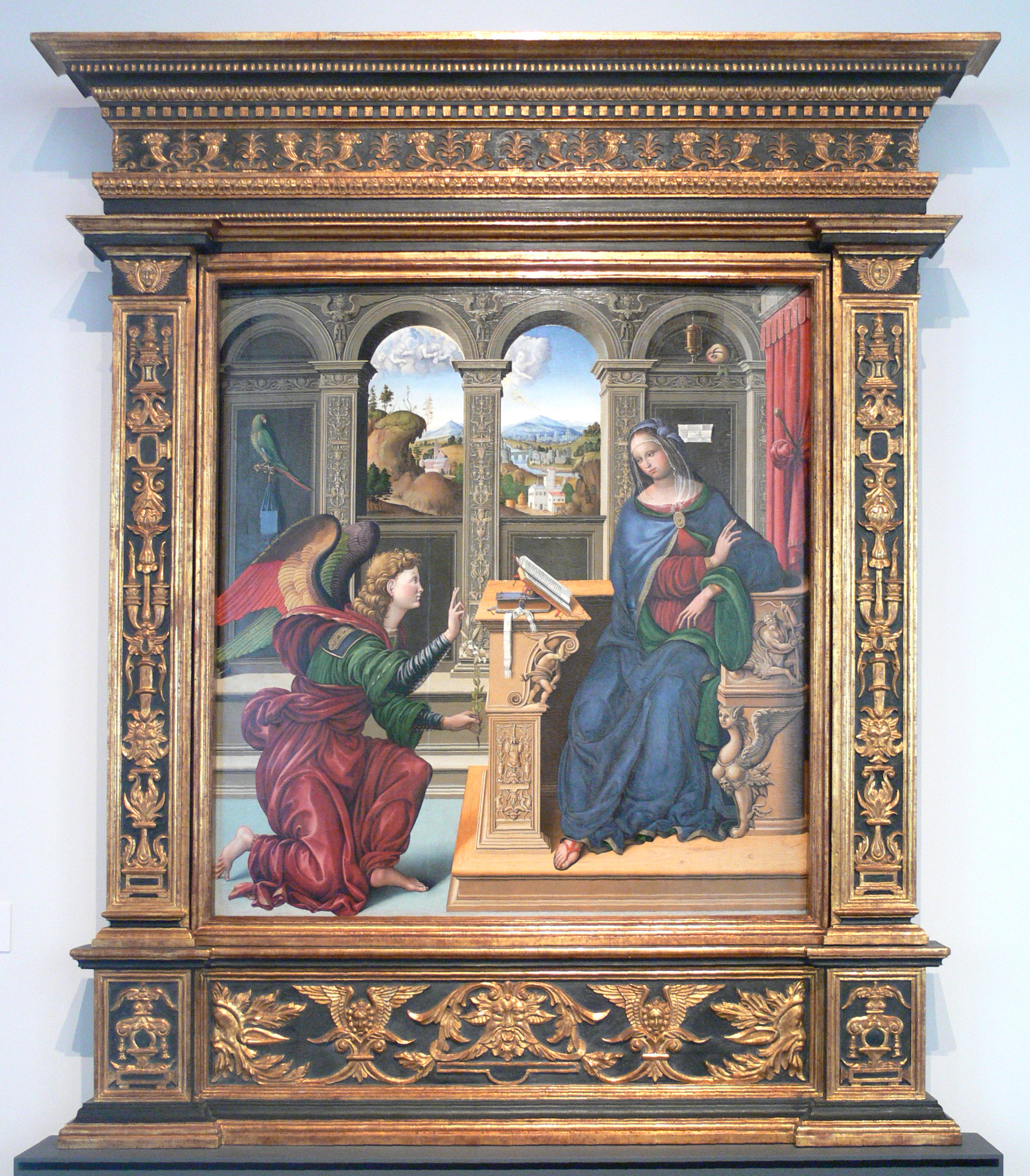
Italian Renaissance frame, The Annunciation Lucca c1500

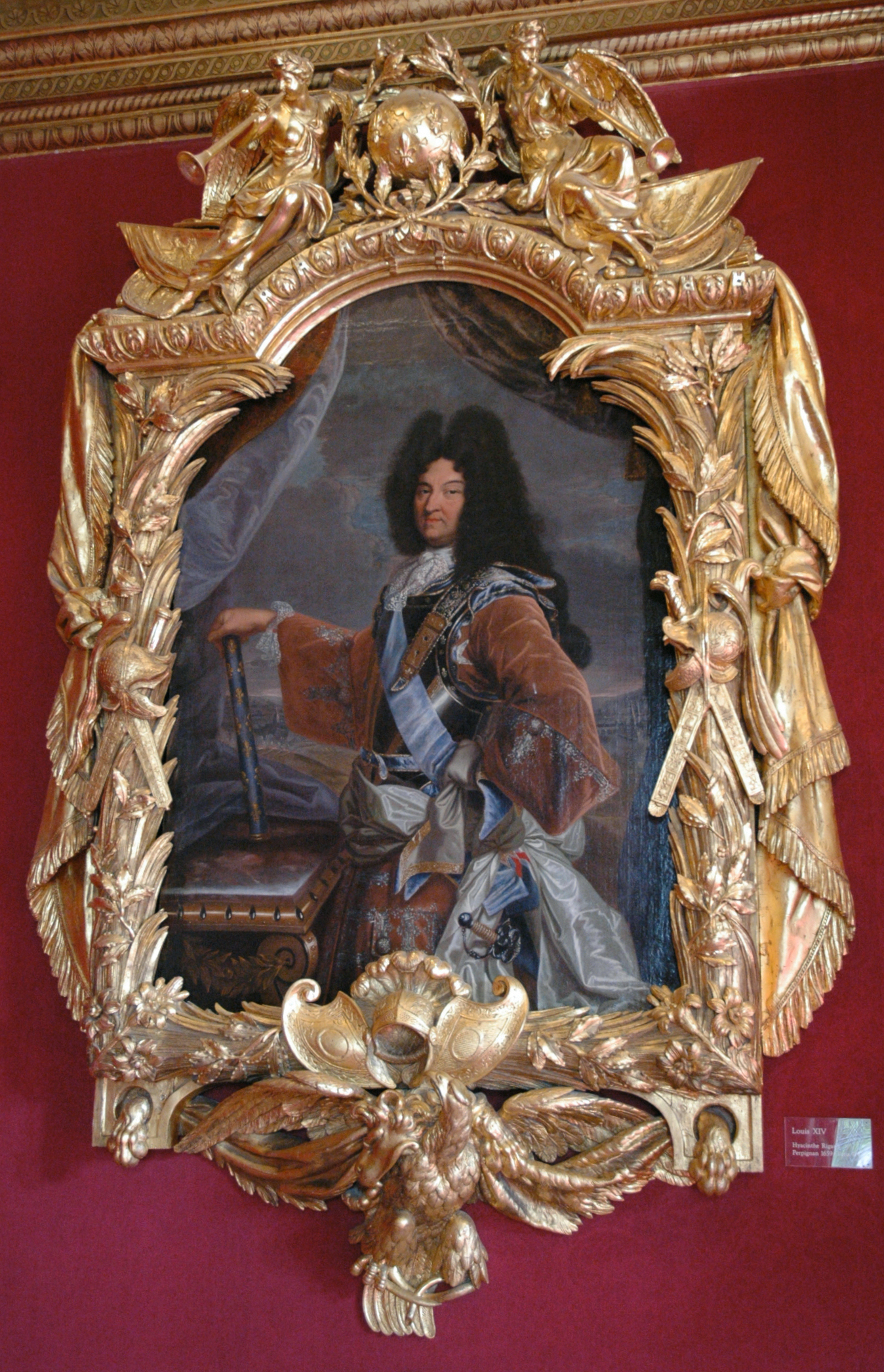
Portrait of King Louis XIV in a gilded baroque frame

The earliest frames are thought to be those that surrounded fayum mummy portraits. The stucco frames may have been used to hang the portraits in the owner's home until the time of death, at which point the portrait would have been placed over the mummy. Another theory is that the portraits were painted close to death and were carried around the city in a funeral procession before the body was taken to the embalmer.

Although framing borders in ancient art were used to divide scenes and ornamentation by ancient Egyptian and Greek artists in pottery and wallpaintings, the first carved wooden frames as we know them today appeared on small panel paintings in twelfth and thirteenth century Europe. According to a historical series published in Picture Frame Magazine, these early "framed panel paintings were made from one piece. The area to be painted was carved out, leaving a raised framing border around the outside edge, like a tray. The whole piece was then gessoed and gilded. Painting the image on the flat panel was the last thing to be done."

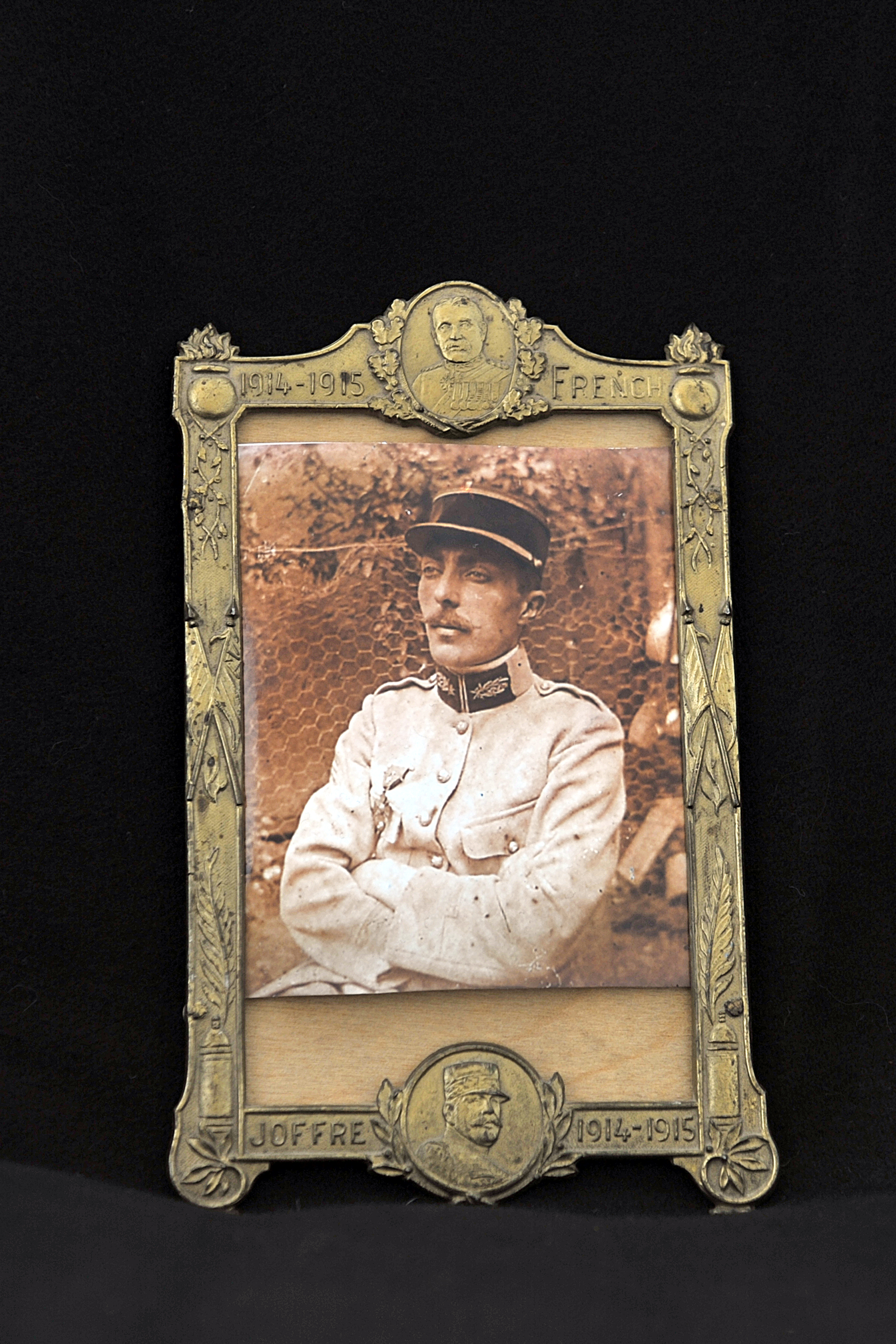
A portrait photograph of a French soldier in uniform in a frame for domestic use, featuring reliefs of Field Marshal French and Marshal Joffre

When it was realized this method of producing a frame and the image within from one slab of wood was too costly, "a more efficient method was eventually developed which used mitred moulding strips. These strips were attached to a flat wooden panel which produced a similar result to the carved panel, but were more cost effective. This type of frame is known as an engaged frame. The early ones were made of simple wooden moulding strips attached to the outside edge of a wooden panel."

Throughout the 14th and 15th centuries, most European frames were church-commissioned and largely unmovable as they were altarpieces and a large part of the church's architecture. The frames were ornamented with architectural elements mimicking the exteriors of the great cathedrals. However, the Italian Renaissance of the 14th and 15th centuries saw the rise of arts patrons extending beyond the church. Wealthy nobles such as the Medici family could now bring art and frames into their estate by commissioning allegorical, devotional and portrait paintings. This was the advent of the portable or moveable frame. Gentile da Fabriano’s Adoration of the Magi (1423) is the first altarpiece made with panel and frame in two separate pieces, making it the first independent frame as we know it today.

Under the reign of Francis I, France's first Renaissance monarch from 1515 through 1547, art came to the forefront of daily life and flourished along with picture frames. Many workers came from Italy to the arts trade, including Leonardo da Vinci, whom "Francis convinced to leave Italy in the last part of his life." Frames were now designed by furniture builders rather than the artist, sculptor or architect as in the past. Books on furniture and interior design were published and in distribution to a wider market than ever before.

From 1610 to 1643, under the reign of Louis XIII in France, the influence of court and refinement took center stage in frame designs. The profiles became thinner than their Italian predecessors, and continuous design such as egg-and-dart, ribbon and flow of leaves, and pronounced low relief corner designs appeared. This paved the way for Baroque design in picture framing, and "Spanish, Flemish, and Italian influences were all at work to produce a curious intermingling and exchange of ideas."

In England, in the late 17th century the "Lely frame" became popular, a narrow moulding with a spray of small flowers at the corner, and central cartouches. The design was based on a French Louis XIII style. Often carved from pine wood, the frames were gilded or silvered. The name is from the portrait artist Peter Lely. An English version of the "auricular" mannerist style, meaning curving "ear-shaped" forms, was also popular in the 17th century, and is now known as a "Sunderland frame". The name derives from the collection of Robert Spencer, 2nd Earl of Sunderland at Althorp. Sunderland style frames for a series of paintings by John Michael Wright of the 22 Fire Judges were made by Mary Ashfield, Mary Fleshier, Mary Dorrell, and John Norris between 1671 and 1675.

Pictures frames as art were highly developed in Orthodox countries (e.g., Russia, Serbia) and used to cover icons in churches. The earliest American frames, known as American Empire Style Frames, are very spare and utilitarian. They are similar to the simple cove or scoop in wall molding found in colonial architecture.

== See also ==
- Diasec
- Fillet (picture framing)
- Fine Art Trade Guild
- Gallery wrap
- Gluck frame
- Gold leaf
- Lightbox, a cube-shaped box used for taking photos, also called photo cube
- Professional Picture Framers Association (PPFA)
- Silver leaf (art)
- Zhuangbiao
