= Picture-framing glass =

Picture-framing glass usually refers to a variety of types flat glass or acrylic ("plexi") used for framing artwork and for presenting art objects in a display box (also, "conservation framing"). The different types include the loosely defined "conservation glass", "anti-reflective glass", and "museum glass". These aim to reduce one or both of distracting reflections from light sources, and damaging ultra-violet radiation, above all from sunlight.

Typically, the types of art displayed and often stored framed under glass are watercolours, drawings and other works on paper. Oil paintings are most often not framed under glass.

== Purpose ==
The primary purpose of glazing in art framing is to clearly exhibit the work while physically protecting it from damaging factors such as light, humidity, heat, and soiling. Laminated glass and some acrylic may be used to protect against physical damage from glass breakage and to offer protection from a malicious attack. Regular glass as well as some glass surface treatments can also filter some of the damaging ultra-violet radiation (UV) and heat (NIR). Artworks that require protective glazing are those rendered on paper or fabrics (including photographs), which contain pigments and dyes that absorb UV and are susceptible to discoloration. If the framed object or artwork is UV-resistant, then UV protection can still serve the purpose of preserving the integrity and colors of non-conservation-grade framing materials susceptible to UV damage, such as mat board (passe partout).

Although protection is a primary purpose of glazing, displaying an artwork is the primary purpose of framing it. Therefore, the least-visible glazing best displays the artwork behind it. Visible light transmission is the primary measure of glass's invisibility, since the viewer actually sees the light, reflected from the artwork. Light transmission of glass is especially important in art framing, since light passes through the glass twice – once to illuminate the artwork, and then again, reflected from the artwork, as colors – before reaching the viewer.

Light transmission (for this article, the perceivable visible spectrum between 390 nm and 750 nm is considered) through glass is diminished either by light reflection or light absorption of the glazing material. The total light transferred through the glazing material (light transmission) is reduced by reflection and absorption. In art framing, light reflection causes glare, while light absorption also may cause the transmitted colors to be dulled or distorted. While type of the glass substrate will affect the light absorption of the glazing, the surface treatment can affect light scattering, light reflection and in some cases, light absorption. There are various glazing options to achieve this goal as explained in the following sections on types of picture-framing glass.

== Types of picture-framing glass ==
=== Regular (or "Clear") ===
Due to widespread availability and low cost, soda-lime glass is most commonly used for picture framing glass. Glass thicknesses typically range from 1.8 to 2.5 millimetres (0.071 to 0.098 in). Clear glass has light transmission of approximately 90%, absorption of approximately 2%, and reflection of approximately 8%. Whereas absorption can be reduced by using low-iron glass, reflection can only be reduced by an anti-reflective surface treatment. This is also known in the trade as "green glass" as the edge of sheet appears green.

=== Low-iron (or "Extra-Clear", "Water White", etc) ===
Low-iron, or water white glass, is made using special iron-free silica, and is generally only available in 2.0-millimetre (0.079 in) thicknesses for picture-framing applications. Because low-iron glass light absorption can be as low as 0.5%, compared to about 2% for clear glass, the light transmission will be better than clear glass. Low-iron glass has light transmission of approximately 91.5% and reflection of 8%.

=== Laminated Glass ===
Laminated glass offers shatter resistance and protection from malicious breakage. The most commonly used configuration is polyvinyl butyral (PVB) foil sandwiched between two layers of glass. Some variations of foils and glass thicknesses can offer shatter and breakage resistance or even bullet resistance. The absorption of laminated glass depends on the glass substrates and foils used in the laminating process. Reflection of laminated glass is similar to monolithic glass, unless surface treatments are applied to reduce reflection.

=== Acrylic ===
Some types of acrylic glass can have the high light transmission and optical quality of glass. Acrylic is also lightweight, compared to glass, and is shatter-resistant, making acrylic an attractive choice for framing large, oversized works of art. In general, acrylic sheets scratch easily and retain a static charge, which can be problematic when framing pastels or charcoals. Some manufacturers add dyes to acrylic glass to filter the UV light transmittance, and its surface can also be treated with both anti-static and anti-reflective coatings.

== Glass surface treatments and coatings ==
Due to the change in the refractive index, as a light beam travels from air (refractive index of about 1) into glass or acrylic (refractive index of about 1.5) and then back into air, these transitions cause part of the light to be reflected. While "anti-glare" (a.k.a. "non-glare" or matte-finish) glass treatments focus on scattering the light, "anti-reflective" coatings actually reduce the amount of light that is reflected from each glazing surface, which has the benefit of increasing the amount of light transmitted through the glazing.

=== Matte (etched, non-glare, or anti-glare) ===
The main purpose of matte glass is to transform the specular reflection into reflection haze. Scattering of the reflected light renders reflected images blurry, so that distinct reflected shapes and sources of light do not distract from the art-viewing experience. Scattering the light does not reduce the reflection or absorption, which remain at the level of the glass substrate. There are several ways of making the glass surface matte, from pressing the pattern when the glass is still soft to fine etching of the glass surface by acid. The quality of matte glass is usually determined by its gloss factor or haze factor.

=== Anti-reflective coatings ===
==== Single-layer ====
Single-layer anti-reflective coatings aim to achieve the refractive index of 1.25 (halfway between air and glass), and can be made by single-layer micro-porous structures achieved by etching, hybrid materials, and other processes suitable for producing large-area coatings for art-framing purposes. Single-layer coatings have been used as a lower-cost alternative to multi-layer anti-reflective coatings. Single-layer anti-reflective coatings can reduce light reflection to as low as 1.5%.

==== Multi-layer ====
The lowest reflection can be achieved with multi-layer anti-reflective coatings, which can be applied by magnetron sputtering, evaporation, or sol-gel process (or other processes that can control the uniformity of deposition on the nanometer scale), and can reduce the light reflection to lower than 0.25% per side (0.5% total).

==== Features of anti-reflective coatings ====
- Light reflection – the main goal of anti-reflective coatings is to reduce the light reflection that causes the glare. Therefore, the lower the light reflection, the less glare reaches the viewer. The best anti-reflective products available for the picture framing market have light reflection of 0.5%. The seemingly small differences in light reflection are actually very important due to the logarithmic response of human eyes to signal intensity (Weber's law). In other words, under normal lighting conditions, the human eye perception of the intensity of a reflected light source in a 1%-reflecting glass surface will be perceived as more than twice of the same light source in 0.5%-reflecting glass.
- Light absorption – light absorption of glazing is the light that is neither transmitted nor reflected by the glazing. Since light is not necessarily absorbed uniformly, some wavelengths may be transmitted more than others, causing the transmitted color to be distorted. A good way to detect light absorption of glazing is the white paper test. This test, used to detect the transmission color of glazing, involves placing a piece of glazing on white paper, and comparing the paper's color with and without the glass. A slight greenish tint will indicate the presence of iron oxide in the raw materials used to produce clear float glass. Additional transmitted colors may result from the absorption of any applied coatings.
- Light transmission – the lower the light reflection and light absorption, the higher the light transmission, and therefore, the visibility of the objects displayed behind the glazing.
- Reflected color – Uncoated glass reflects light uniformly and does not cause reflected light to be distorted (a white light source reflected in a non-coated glass pane will still appear white). However, anti-reflective coatings typically cause some wavelengths of light to be reflected more than others, causing a shift in the reflected color. This way, a white light source reflected in an anti-reflected glass surface may appear green or blue or red, depending on the wavelengths that are favored by a particular anti-reflective coating design.
- Intensity of reflected color – the intensity of a reflected color can be measured by its relative distance from the color neutral zone (i.e. white). Due to the variability of industrial processes, some producers design their anti-reflective coatings to have more intense colors so that the statistical deviation of outcomes falls within a specific color (green or blue, etc.). The tighter a manufacturer's control of its processes, the closer the design can be to the color neutral zone, without crossing over from a designated color.
- Reflected color under an angle – as a reflected light source is reflected from the glazing under a shallow angle, some anti-reflective coatings may cause the reflected color to shift. Therefore, in picture framing, a stable color under a wide viewing angle is desirable.
- Cleaning – since anti-reflective coatings render the glass surface virtually invisible, the dirt or soiling of the surface is much more visible on an anti-reflective surface. This enhanced visibility of surface smudges presents difficulties when cleaning anti-reflective-coated glass. Therefore, some anti-reflective coatings have special surface treatments to improve cleanability, while others give special cleaning instructions to avoid damage to their coatings.
- Handling – Some coatings are more durable than others. A scratch through an anti-reflective coating is also much more visible than a scratch through the surface of uncoated glass due to the difference in the reflectivity of the scratched surface (for glass, about 8%) and the reflectivity of the anti-reflective surface around the scratch (about 0.5%). Therefore, anti-reflective coatings with more scratch-resistance are preferred in art glazing. Magnetron-sputtered and sol-gel anti-reflective coatings are typically metal oxides with superior hardness compared to other application methods.

==== UV-filtering coatings ====
In order to reduce the amount of damaging light radiation transmitted through glazing, some glass coatings are designed to either reflect or absorb the ultraviolet (UV) spectrum. The following technologies are used to reduce the amount of UV from reaching the artwork:

- Organic UV absorbers are added to an inert, inorganic, silica-based coating to yield a UV absorbing layer on one side of the glass. Organic UV absorbers are capable of blocking almost 100% of UV radiation between 300 nm to 380 nm, but in an industrial environment it is difficult to make a sharp UV cutoff without affecting the visible spectrum; therefore, UV absorbers tend to also increase the absorption of visible light. Chemically-deposited UV absorbers also result in a less-scratch-resistant surface than magnetron-sputtered or sol-gel UV blocking layers, as evidenced by the manufacturer's recommendation for avoiding environmental and other contact with the UV-coated side.
- Interference UV blockers are usually built into anti-reflective interference thin-film stacks, and focus on maximizing the UV reflection below the visible light boundary. Industrially-available sol-gel processes offer up to 84% UV block, while magnetron-sputtered AR/UV-Blocking layers can block up to 92% with no adverse effects on the transmission or absorption of visible light.
- UV filtering of the substrate is possible by adding UV filtering agents during the production of the substrate. While typical clear float glass blocks approximately 45% of UV radiation, the addition of CeO_{2} to glass has been shown to further reduce UV transmission as well as widespread use of organic UV blocking dyes in the production of acrylic substrates. Most soda-lime glass completely absorbs short-wavelength UV-B radiation below 300 nm. Low-iron glass typically blocks approximately 12% of UV radiation between 300 and 380 nm.

== UV protection in art glazing ==
=== UV definition in art framing ===
The most widely used definition of "UV Light" in the framing industry has been defined as non-weighted average transmittance between 300 nm and 380 nm, while the ISO-DIS-21348 standard for determining irradiances defines various UV light ranges:

Name	Abbreviation	Wavelength range in nanometers	Energy per photon
Ultraviolet A, long wave, or black light	UVA	400 nm–315 nm	3.10–3.94 eV
Near	NUV	400 nm–300 nm	3.10–4.13 eV
Ultraviolet B or medium wave	UVB	315 nm–280 nm	3.94–4.43 eV

The definition of the upper limit of UV protection as 380 nm by the framing industry is not consistent with accepted standards above.

According to the Library of Congress preservation department, artwork damage does not stop at 380 nm, and all radiation (UV, visible, IR) has the potential to damage art. Thus, calculating a simple average of all wavelengths between 300 nm and 380 nm does not account for the fact that different wavelengths have different artwork-damage potential. At least two other methods exist, which provide a more holistic measurement of radiation damage, from both the UV and visible portions of the spectrum:

- The Krochmann Damage Function (KDF) is used to rate a glazing's ability to limit fading potential. It expresses the percentage of both UV and of that portion of the visible spectrum from 300 nm to 600 nm that passes through the window and weights each wavelength in relation to the potential damage it can cause to typical materials. Lower numbers are better.
- ISO-CIE Damage-Weighted Transmission (ISO) uses a weighting function recommended by the International Commission on Illumination (CIE). Its spectral range is also weighted and extends from 300 nm to 700 nm.

For picture-framing purposes, it is not appropriate to use these methods for absolute ratings, since "better" ratings are obtained with lower visible light transmission, which is not aesthetically desirable in a framing glazing. However, by including more art-damaging factors than UV radiation between 300 nm and 380 nm, these methods provide a more holistic relative ranking tool. For example, comparing a 99% and 92% UV-blocking glazing, would translate to 44% and 41%, respectively, under the KDF.

=== How much UV filtering should a glazing have? ===
The discussion on how much UV filtering is necessary in art framing is complex and controversial, driven by conflicting corporate interests. There have so far been no independent organizations, not tied to corporate sponsors, which have presented scientifically verifiable and conclusive evidence to the amount of UV filtering necessary for a glazing to both display and at the same time protect an artwork. On one hand, the issue is complicated by the varying amount of damaging light actually present in an indoor environment (from low-level indirect sources to direct daylight), and on the other hand by the fact that not only UV, but also visible light, damages an artwork. According to the National Fenestration Rating Council, only 40% of artwork fading is caused by UV radiation. The remaining damage comes from visible light, heat, humidity, and material chemistry. This means that increasing visible light transmission by an anti-reflective coating actually increases the amount of damaging radiation on an artwork.

One of the most thorough and independent studies was conducted by the US Library of Congress in an effort to display and preserve the US Declaration of Independence. At first, it was decided to use special yellow Plexiglass UF3, which removes both the ultraviolet and blue end of the visible spectrum, with significant, but acceptable interference for viewing. Sealing the display by a chemically inert gas such as nitrogen, argon, or helium also aided its preservation. In 2001, the display of the US Declaration of Independence was revised to include a multi-laminated glazing for shatter resistance, with sol-gel interference-based multi-layer anti-reflective coatings on outer surfaces to improve the visibility of the document.

From the above evidence, it can be concluded that if preservation were the only goal of glazing, then only a dark, climate-controlled space would offer the best possible protection for an artwork, which can be exhibited once in every several years, while no glass at all provides a perfect displaying option. Therefore, for those artworks which are chosen to be displayed, the ideal amount of UV blocking should be as much as possible, without affecting the visible light transmission.

=== Controlling UV lighting inside ===
While determining how much UV light should be filtered by art glazing, it may also be important to consider the amount of UV light present inside a room or a building. Regular window glazing filters away a significant portion of the UV light, which originates from the sun.

The relative amounts of damaging light in equal quantities of light:

Illumination	Relative Damage
Horizontal skylight, open	100%
Horizontal skylight, window glass	34%

The above indicates that the damage level of even direct sunlight coming from the horizontal skylight is reduced to 36% by regular window glass. Due to the sun's changing position, even less direct light enters through side windows, and hanging an artwork away from direct sunlight reduces the exposure to potentially damaging direct sunlight even further.

Indoor lighting, especially fluorescent lighting, contains some UV Light. GELighting.com asserts that "UV exposure from sitting indoors under fluorescent lights at typical office light levels for an eight-hour workday is equivalent to just over one minute of exposure to the sun in Washington D.C., on a clear day in July." Additionally, the relative damage of incandescent light is 3 times less than that of fluorescent light. Since UV-filtering picture-framing glass does not protect against all damage factors, it is important to display framed artwork in a well-controlled environment to reduce the effects of heat, humidity, and visible light.

== See also ==
- Professional Picture Framers Association
