= Professional Picture Framers Association =

Organization

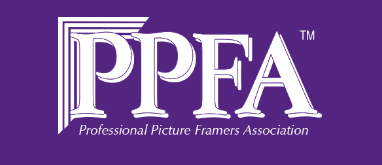
- Formation: 21 August 1971
- Headquarters: 83 South Street, Unit 307 Freehold, NJ 07728
- Official language: English
- Website: www.ppfa.com

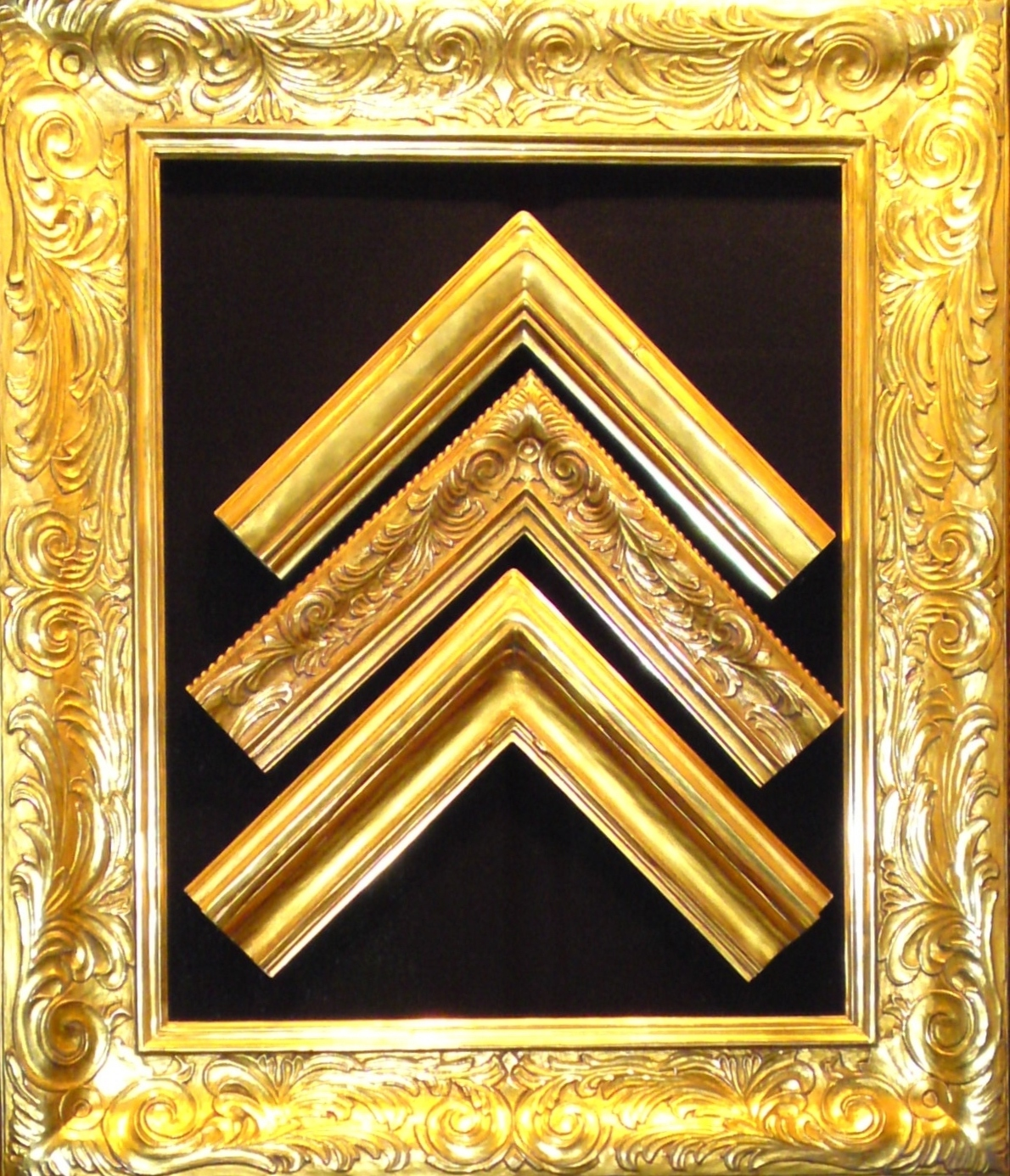
Reproductions of antique gilded picture frame mouldings

The Professional Picture Framers Association / PPFA is an international trade organization serving the art and framing community worldwide since 1971. Members include independent frame shop owners and staff, distributors and manufacturers of picture frame mouldings, supplies and equipment, art galleries, artists, and other businesses in the custom picture framing industry.

PPFA connects members to a network of knowledge and support, and offers education, an annual Convention, certification, competitions, marketing and business services, and member benefits.

The association is managed by Monarch Expositions.

== History ==
- Incorporated on August 21, 1971 with offices in Richmond, Virginia established in 1973
- The first PRINT Framing Competition was held in Burlingame, CA in 1971
- The first OPEN Framing Competition was held in New York, NY in 1975
- Launched the Certified Picture Framer certification program in 1986
- Became part of the Photo Marketing Association (PMA) in 2001
- Launched the Master Certified Picture Framer certification program in 2003
- Monarch Exhibitions purchased PPFA in July 2015

== Annual Convention ==
The association has an annual convention each January in Las Vegas, Nevada at the West Coast Art & Frame Expo/The National Conference. The event includes the finals of the PPFA international PRINT and OPEN framing competition; PPFA education; certification exams and courses; and special events such as a keynote speaker and welcome reception.

== See also ==
- Gallery wrap
- Mat (picture framing)
- Fillet (picture framing)
- Gilding
- Gold leaf
- Silver leaf (art)
- Picture framing glass
- Picture frame
