= Metal leaf =

Extremely thin sheet of metal

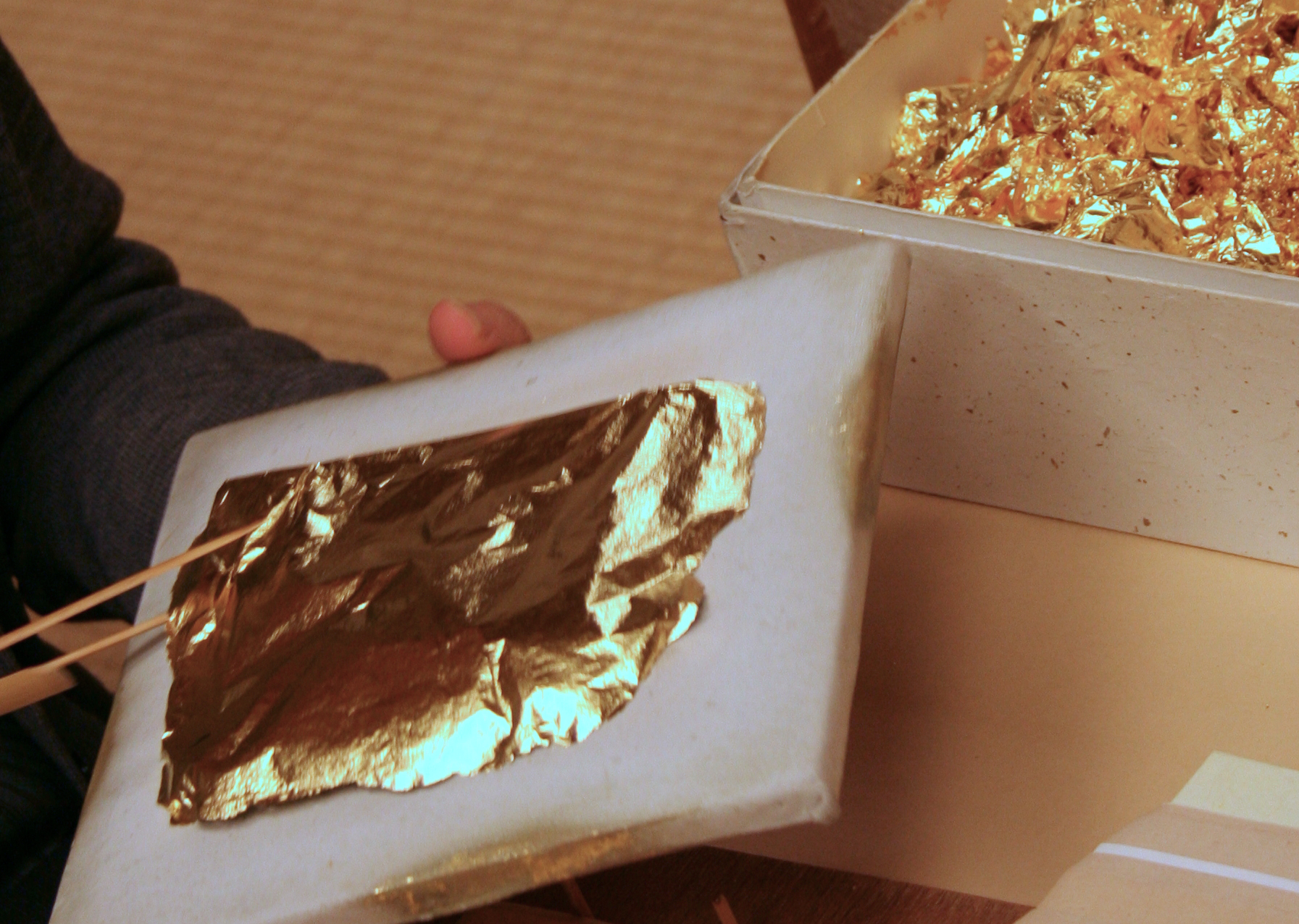
Metal leaf processing

A metal leaf, also called composition leaf or schlagmetal, is a thin foil used for gilding and other forms of decoration. Metal leaves can come in many different shades, due to the composition of the metal within the metal leaf. Examples of this variation of shades in metal leaves can be found in Ancient Egyptian gold leaves, as the silver content within the gold leaves could make them appear bright yellow or paler shades of yellow. Some metal leaves may look like gold leaf but do not contain any real gold. This type of metal leaf is often referred to as imitation leaf.

Metal leaves are usually made of gold (including many alloys), silver, copper, aluminium, brass (sometimes called "Dutch metal" typically 85% copper and 15% zinc) or palladium, as well as platinum.

== Gilding ==
Gilding is the process of applying a thin layer of metal on another surface. Goldbeating, the technique of producing metal leaves, has been known for more than 5,000 years. A small gold nugget 5 mm in diameter can be expanded to about 20,000 times its initial surface through hammering, producing a gold foil surface of about one half square meter with a thickness of 0.2–0.3 μm.

The process of gilding requires meticulous preparation, including priming surfaces and applying thin layers of adhesive before placing the gold leaf. Modern restoration projects often reapply gold leaf to maintain its brilliance and historical integrity. For example, the Church of Nossa Senhora da Conceição dos Militares in Brazil underwent conservation efforts to preserve its gilded surfaces, ensuring the continuation of its religious and artistic significance.

While mercury, vermeil, and ormolu gilding were mostly used with gold leaf, electroplating is a gilding technique that does not use leaf. The process of electroplating typically involves dipping an item into electric and heated water. Ions from minerals and metals within the water move away from the negatively charged electricity and then plate the cathode– or item's surface that is to be plated. This was discovered in 1805 by Luigi Brugnatelli and it was later developed further by George and Henry Elkington in 1940.

== Cultural significance ==
Known for its reflective and durable properties, gold leaf has been used to symbolize divinity, purity, and eternal life. Churches throughout history have employed metal leaf for its aesthetic and symbolic qualities, often in mosaics, domes, and religious icons.

The tradition of using gold ground in Christian art comes from Roman art, where it originally had no religious significance. Its shining quality was conceived as the light of God, underlining the spiritual nature of the figures represented and of the holy spaces. This tradition flowed throughout the centuries, as European churches used gold leaf to outline the richness and the sacredness of the domes, altars, and sculptures.

Domes are an especially salient feature faced with gold leaf. In Russian Orthodox architecture, gilded onion domes symbolize the realms of heaven and usually have theological meaning. Three domes, for example, signify the Holy Trinity, and five represent Christ and the Four Evangelists. Procedures such as applying 23.75-karat gold leaf ensure longevity and a radiating finish to maintain their visual and spiritual impact.

Vark is a type of flavorless and edible silver leaf. It is used for decoration in South Asian cuisine, as well as added for medicinal and purifying properties. It is created through pounding metal dust onto parchment sheets and ox guts until it molds into a foil, however it was only up until the 21st century that people have started to stop using intestines.

== See also ==
- Professional Picture Framers Association
