= Congregation of the Annunciation =

Belgian Benedictine Catholic congregation

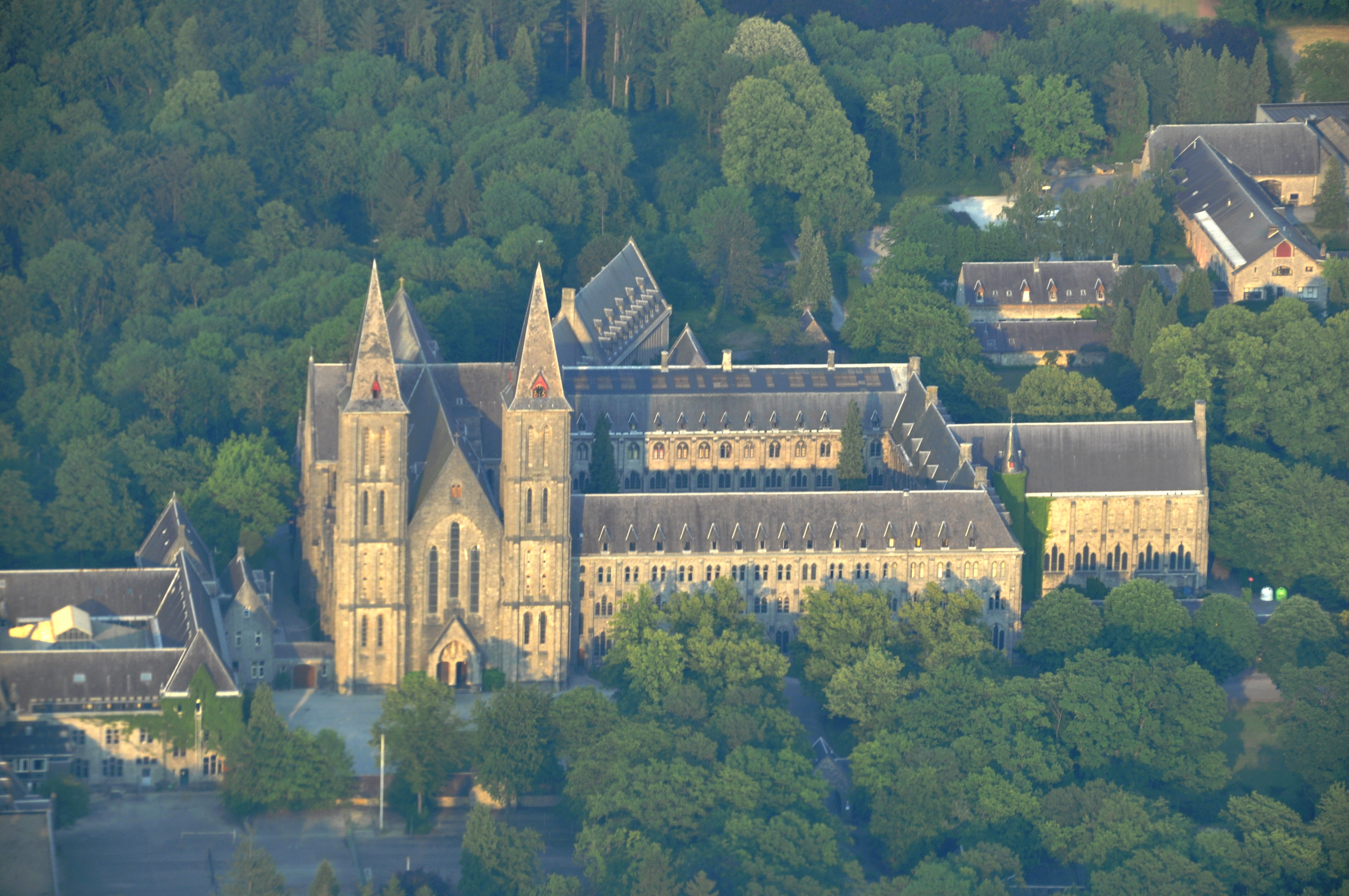
Abbaye de Maredsous

The Congregation of the Annunciation (Congregatio Annuntiationis B.M.V.), formerly known as the Belgian Congregation, is a congregation of monasteries within the Roman Catholic Benedictine Confederation. Founded in 1920, the Congregation includes fifteen independent male monasteries spread throughout ten countries. Additionally, two female monasteries are members of the Congregation, while a further ten are affiliated with the Congregation.

== History ==
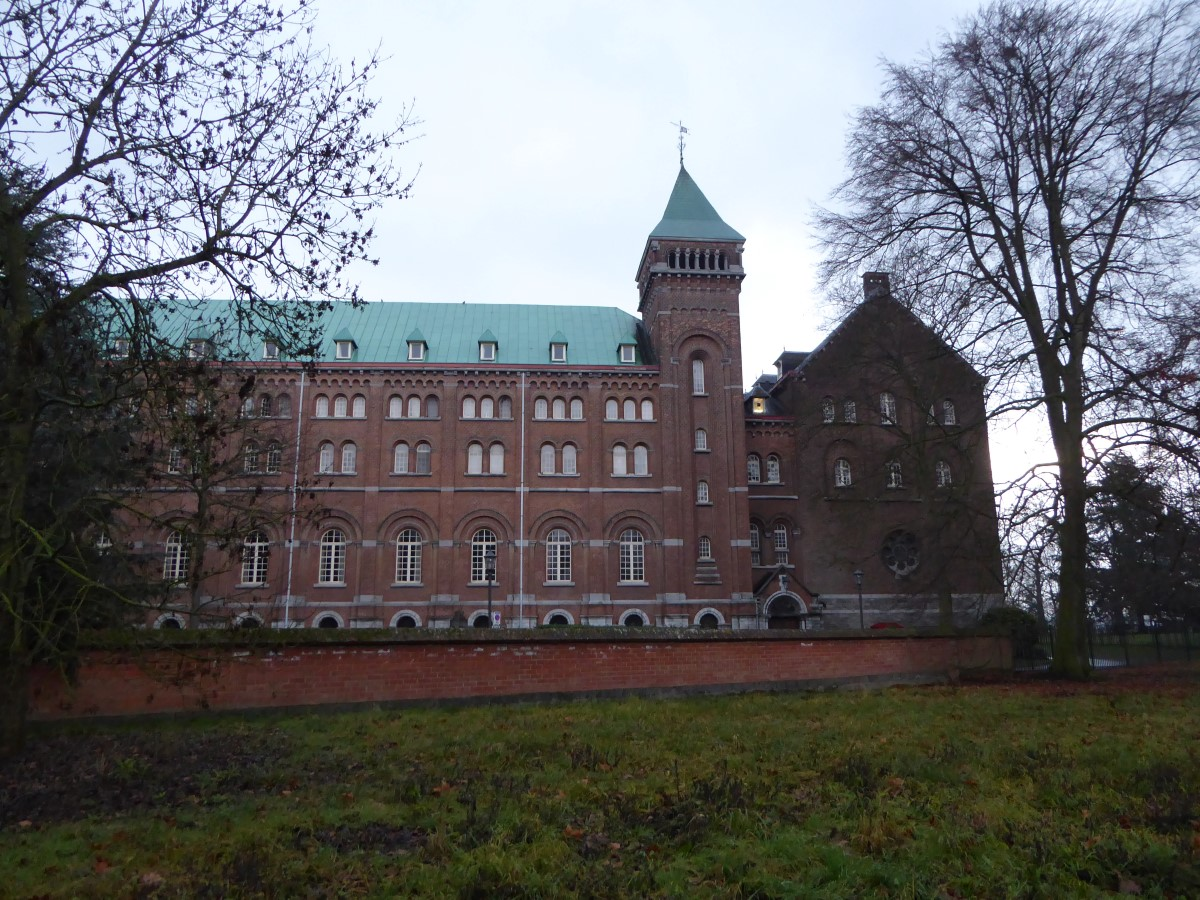
Keizersberg Abbey, Leuven

In 1920, the Belgian Congregation of the Annunciation was founded by three of the great abbeys of Belgium: St. Andrew's Abbey in Bruges, Keizersberg Abbey, and Maredsous Abbey. These monasteries shared descent from the Abbey of Beuron. Their respective abbots, Theodore Neve, Robert de Kerchove, and Columba Marmion, chose to unite their communities into a new congregation.

Yet even before its inception, the international character of the Annunciation Congregation was nascent. Gerard van Caloen, founder of St. Andrew's Abbey, dreamed of reviving the missionary apostolate of such early Benedictines as Boniface, Apostle of the Germans. While acting as the Beuronese Congregation's procurator in Rome, Van Caloen saw that the Brazilian Congregation was in need of assistance. Thus, in 1898, he facilitated the foundation of St. Andrew's Abbey as a procura for monastic restoration. Upon being raised to an abbey in 1901, St. Andrew's Abbey was incorporated into the Brazilian Congregation, but was detached from it in 1920 to form the Congregation of the Annunciation.

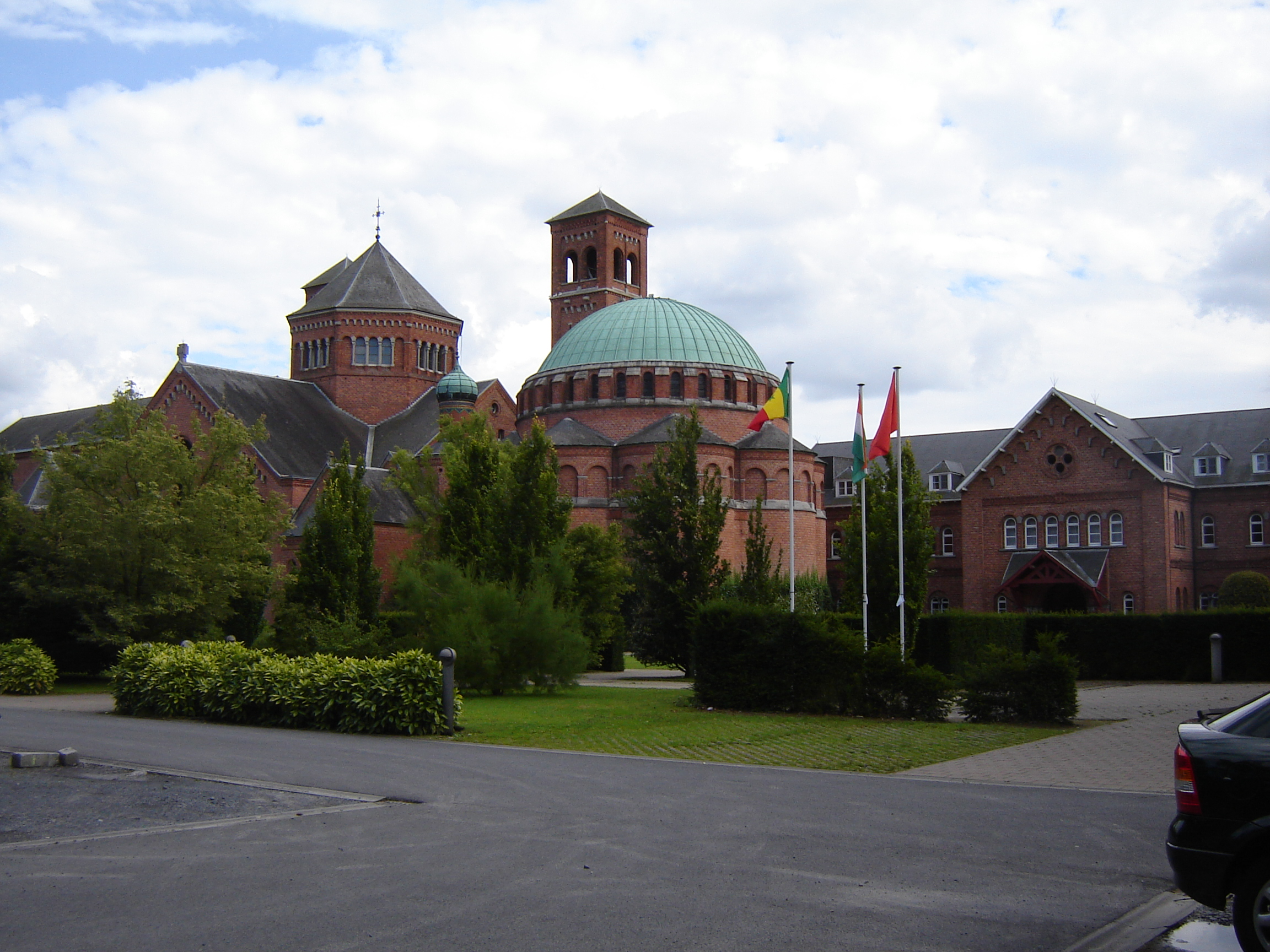
Sint-Andriesabdij, Zevenkerken

Under Van Caloen's successor, Abbot Theodore Neve, the monks of St. Andrew's Abbey established mission stations in the Belgian Congo. The abbey would go on to create monastic foundations in China, India, Poland, the United States, and Zaire. Likewise, Maredsous established an Irish foundation in 1927, which in turn has expanded to Nigeria. The Polish community at Tyniec near Kraków has founded two additional houses in Poland, and one in Slovakia.

Over the years, the Annunciation Congregation has also expanded by incorporating previously existing abbeys. Thus, the Abbey of St Matthias (Germany), Egmond Abbey (Netherlands), the Abbey of Our Lady of Exile (Trinidad and Tobago), and St Benedict's Abbey, Singeverga (Portugal) have contributed their mature monastic communities to the Congregation.

In 1968, the monastery of Mont César, Louvain (Belgium) withdrew from the Congregation to join the Flemish Province of the Subiaco Congregation.

== Governance ==
Under the Constitutions of the Congregation of the Annunciation, canonical visitations of member houses are conducted four years. Likewise, the General Chapter convenes every four years. The General Chapter, organized at one of the Congregation's European abbeys, brings together a superior and an elected delegate from each of the Congregation's monasteries.

The Abbot President of the Congregation of the Annunciation is Father Maksymilian Nawara of the Monastery of Lubin, Poland The Abbot President is elected every eight years.

== List of member houses and "dependencies" ==
Member houses and dependencies:

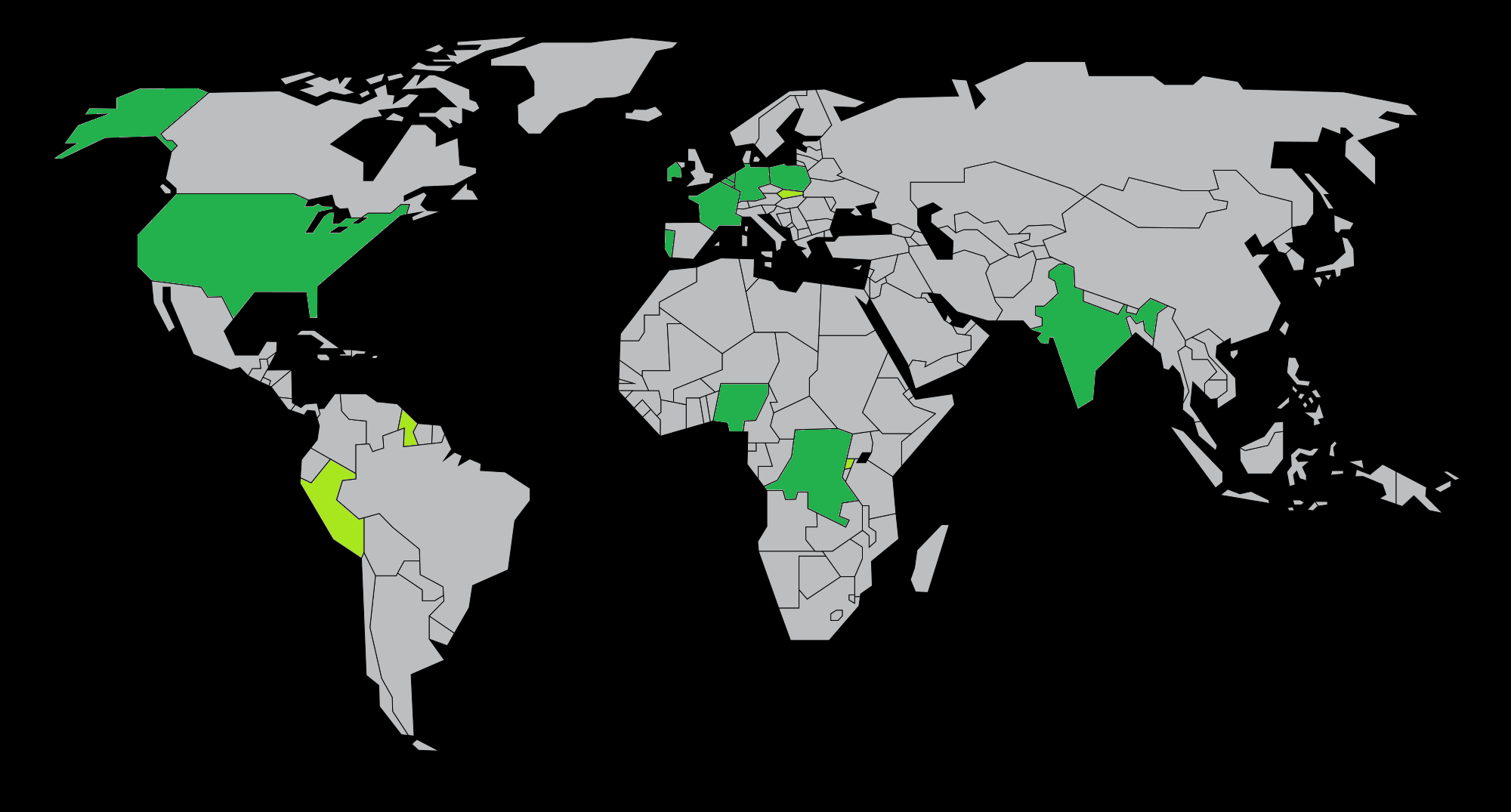
The locations of independent (green) and dependent (light green) monasteries of the Annunciation Congregation

=== Africa ===
- Simple Priory B.M.V. a Victoriis, Luena, Angola
- Monastère Notre-Dame-des-Sources (1944), Lubumbashi, Democratic Republic of the Congo
- St. Benedict's Priory (1979), Ewu-Ishan, Nigeria
- Priory Notre-Dame de L'Annonciation, Sovu, Rwanda
- Cella de Kigufi, Kigufi, Rwanda

=== Americas ===
- Abbey of Our Lady of Exile (1912), Tunapuna, Trinidad and Tobago
- St. Andrew's Abbey (1956), Valyermo, California

=== Asia ===
- Abbey of the Dormition, Jerusalem

=== Europe ===
- Monastère Saint-Remacle (1950), Wavreumont, Belgium
  - Monasterio de la Resurreccion, Chucuito, (1992), Peru (founded from Wavreumont)
- Monastère Saint-André de Clerlande (1970), Ottignies, Belgium
  - Prieuré de Mambre (1978), Kinshasa, Democratic Republic of the Congo
- Abbaye de Maredsous (1872), Denée
  - Simple Priory des SS. Pierre et Paul, (1958), Gihindamuyaga, Rwanda
- Sint-Andriesadbdij Zevenkerken (1902), Sint-Andries, Belgium
  - Asirvanam Priory, Bangalore, India
    - St Thomas Benedictine Monastery, (1988), Kappadu: Syro-Malabar rite
- Abadia de S. Bento de Singeverga, Porto, Portugal
  - Mosteiro de S. Bento da Vitoria, Porto, Portugal
  - Colegio de Lamego, Lamego, Portugal
- Prieuré Saint-Benoit (1988), Étiolles, France
- Benediktinerabtei St. Matthias, Trier, Germany
  - Benediktinerpriorat Huysburg
- Glenstal Abbey (1927), Murroe, Ireland
- Sint Adelbert Abdij (1935), Egmond, Netherlands
- Benedictine Abbey of Tyniec (1044), Tyniec, Poland
  - Klasztor Zwiastowania (1987), Biskupów
  - Kláštor Premenenia Pána (2010), Sampor, Slovakia
- Priory Nativitatis B.M.V. (1923), Lubin
- Abbey de la Paix Notre-Dame, Liege, Belgium

== Affiliates ==
- Home Casa de Huambo, Angola
- Abbey Sainte-Gertrude, Belgium
- Conventual Priory of Our Lady Van Bethanie, Loppem, Belgium
- Conventual Priory de L'Alliance
- Priory Notre-Dame, Ermeton-Sur-Biert, Belgium

== Benedictine nuns ==
- Abbey of the Immaculate Conception of the Blessed Virgin Mary in Zhytomyr, Ukraine
- l’Abbaye des saints Jean et Scolastique, Maredret, Belgium
- St Joseph Monastery in Solonka, Ukraine, dependent from Zhytomyr Abbey

=== Affiliates ===
- Ermeton Abbey, Belgium

== See also ==
- Order of Saint Benedict
- Benedictine Confederation
