= Gerard van Caloen =

Roman Catholic bishop (1853–1932)

Gerard van Caloen O.S.B.
- Titular Bishop of Phocaea
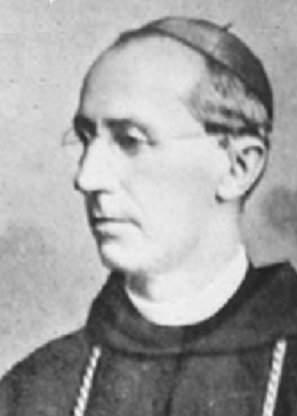
- Church: Catholic Church
- See: Titular See of Phocaea
- In office: 24 March 1906 – 16 January 1932
- Predecessor: Richard Preston
- Successor: Luiz Scortegagna
- Previous post: Abbott of the Territorial Abbey of Nossa Senhora do Monserrate do Rio de Janeiro (1905-1915)

Orders
- Ordination: 26 December 1876
- Consecration: 18 April 1906 by Francisco do Rego Maia

Personal details
- Born: 12 March 1853 Bruges, Belgium
- Died: 16 January 1932 (aged 78) Antibes, France

Gerard van Caloen, OSB (1853–1932) was a Belgian Catholic liturgist, missionary, abbot, and bishop. A Benedictine monk, he was rector of the abbey school at Maredsous, where in 1882 he published the Missel des Fidèles, the first French-Latin missal. He also introduced British-style association football to the school. In 1886, he was professor of liturgy at the College of Sant'Anselmo in Rome.

In 1893, Caloen was tasked to help revive the Benedictine Congregation in Brazil, which had previously been negatively impacted by anticlerical legislation. To this end, he founded, on land donated by his family, St. Andrew's Abbey in Zevenkerken to train monks for the Brazilian mission. During this time, his remit was changed to include missionary work as well as monastic restoration.

In 1895 he and a group of monks traveled to Olinda. In 1899 he was named general vicar of the Brazilian congregation, and in 1906 bishop of the mission district of Rio Branco. He returned to Belgium in 1919, He died in 1932.

== Life ==
=== Early life ===
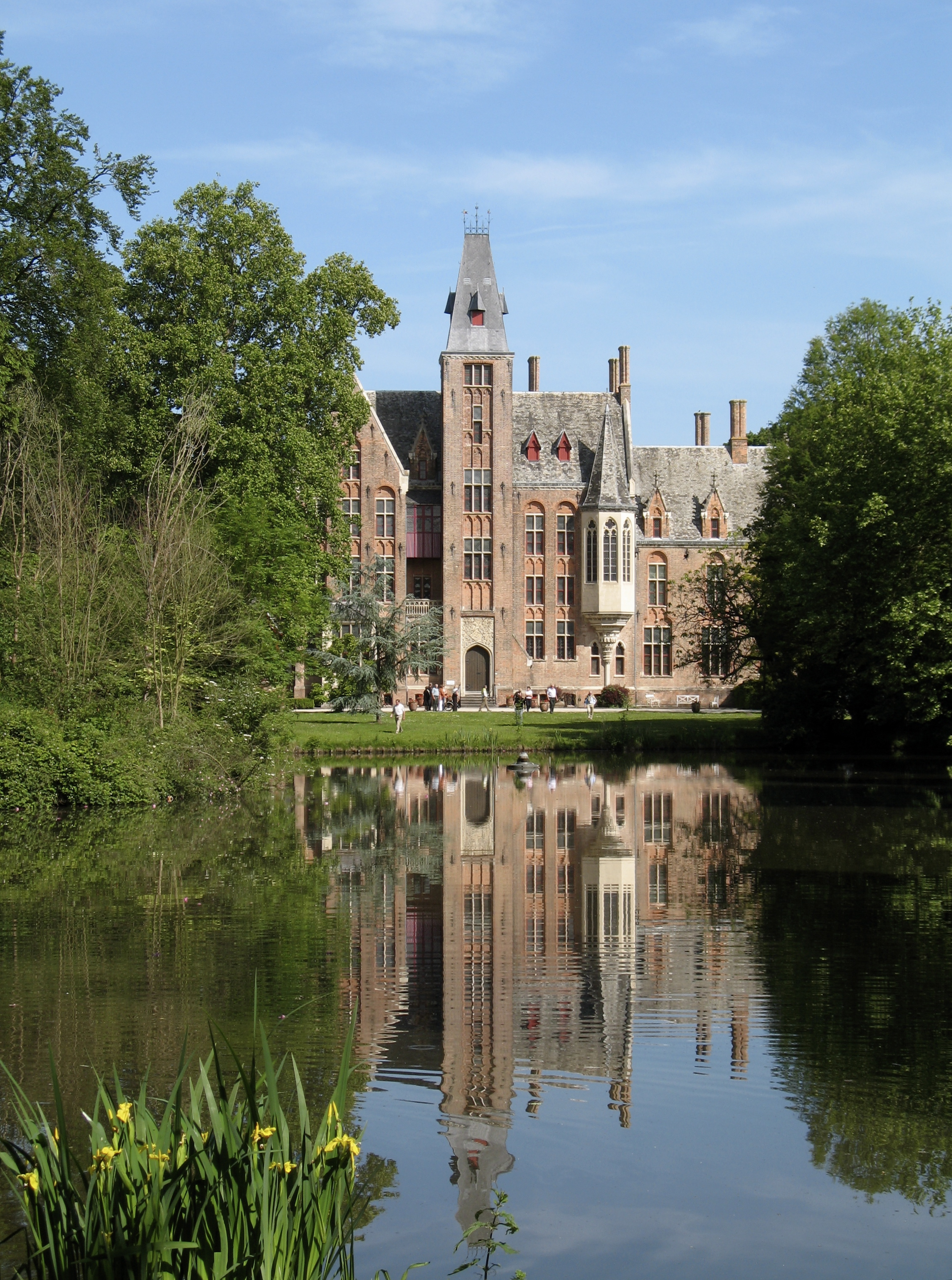
Lophem Castle

Joseph Van Caloen was born in Bruges in 1853, the son of Baron Karl Van Caloen and his wife Marie. They lived at the castle of Lophem near Bruges. Joseph's cousin was Hildebrand de Hemptinne, who had been instrumental in the founding in Belgium of a daughter house of St. Michael's Abbey in Beuron. In 1873 Josef became the first postulant of the Benedictine community of Maredsous, who were staying at the Desclee castle at Maredret, awaiting completion of the Priory of Maredsous. His parents played a significant role in financing the construction work. He was then clothed in Beuron and given the name "Gerard".

For health reasons he completed his novitiate on the French Riviera at a villa owned by a community of nuns. On May 25, 1874, he made his profession and was ordained a priest on December 23, 1876, in Montecassino and the next day named prior and master of novices at Maredsous. When in 1878 Maredsous was raised to an abbey, Placidus Wolter, was named as the new abbot, and Caloen was appointed Librarian. Caloen wished to create a secondary school in the abbey and went to England to observe the methods of education there. He discovered football there and came back with a round ball. In 1881, the first students of the abbey school of Maredsous were among the pioneers of football in Belgium.

=== Liturgist ===
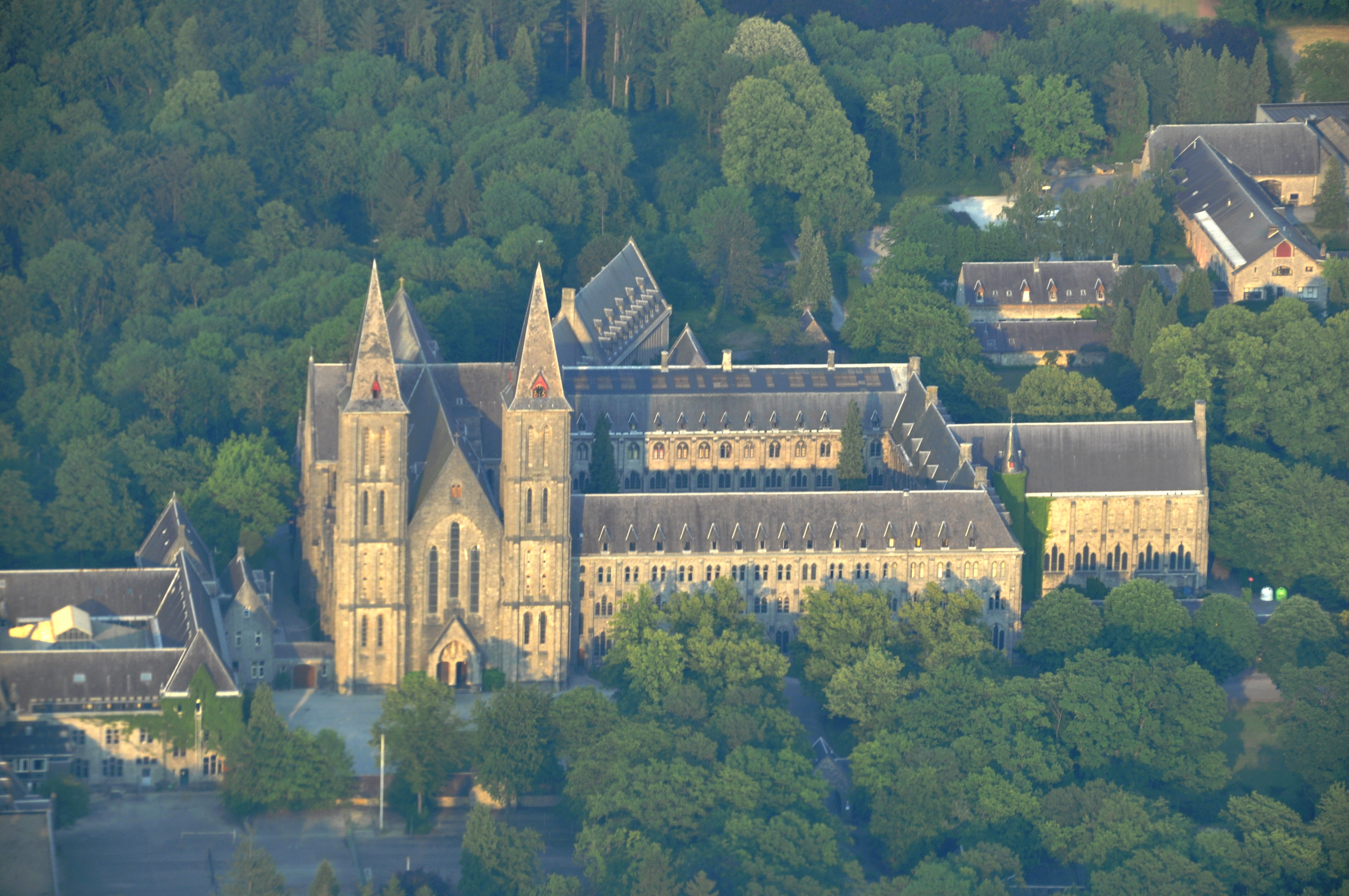
Abbaye de Maredsous

In 1882 Caloen published the Missel des Fidèles, the first French-Latin missal. The following year, his remarks during a liturgical congress at Liège caused controversy when he spoke favorably of lay participation in the Mass, and that those present should receive communion during Mass rather than before or after. The Missel des Fidèles, with its introductions and explanations helped to make the Mass intelligible to the laity. This was a significant moment in the nascent Belgian Liturgical Movement. (Years later Dom Gaspar Lefebvre, of St. Andrew's Abbey, Zevenkerken, would make significant pastoral contributions to the liturgical movement by publishing from 1920 to 1959 bilingual missals from Latin into English, French, Dutch, and Italian.)

In 1884 Caloen founded the journal Messager des Fidèles, which in 1890 became the Revue Benédictine. "Messager des Fidèles is significant as the first publication founded to assist the promotion of the liturgical movement."

In 1886 Caloen was named Procurator General for the Beuronese Congregation and sent to Rome, where he participated in the establishment of the Benedictine College of Sant’ Anselmo on the Aventine. There he became professor of liturgy. In 1888 Abbot Placidus sent him to Louvain to assist in the development of a monastic house of studies at the university. Caloen was a chaplain to university students and began the initial planning for a monastic foundation from Maredsous to be made in Louvain. In 1888 he became head of the study house in Louvain, and in 1893 again procurator in Rome.

=== Missionary ===
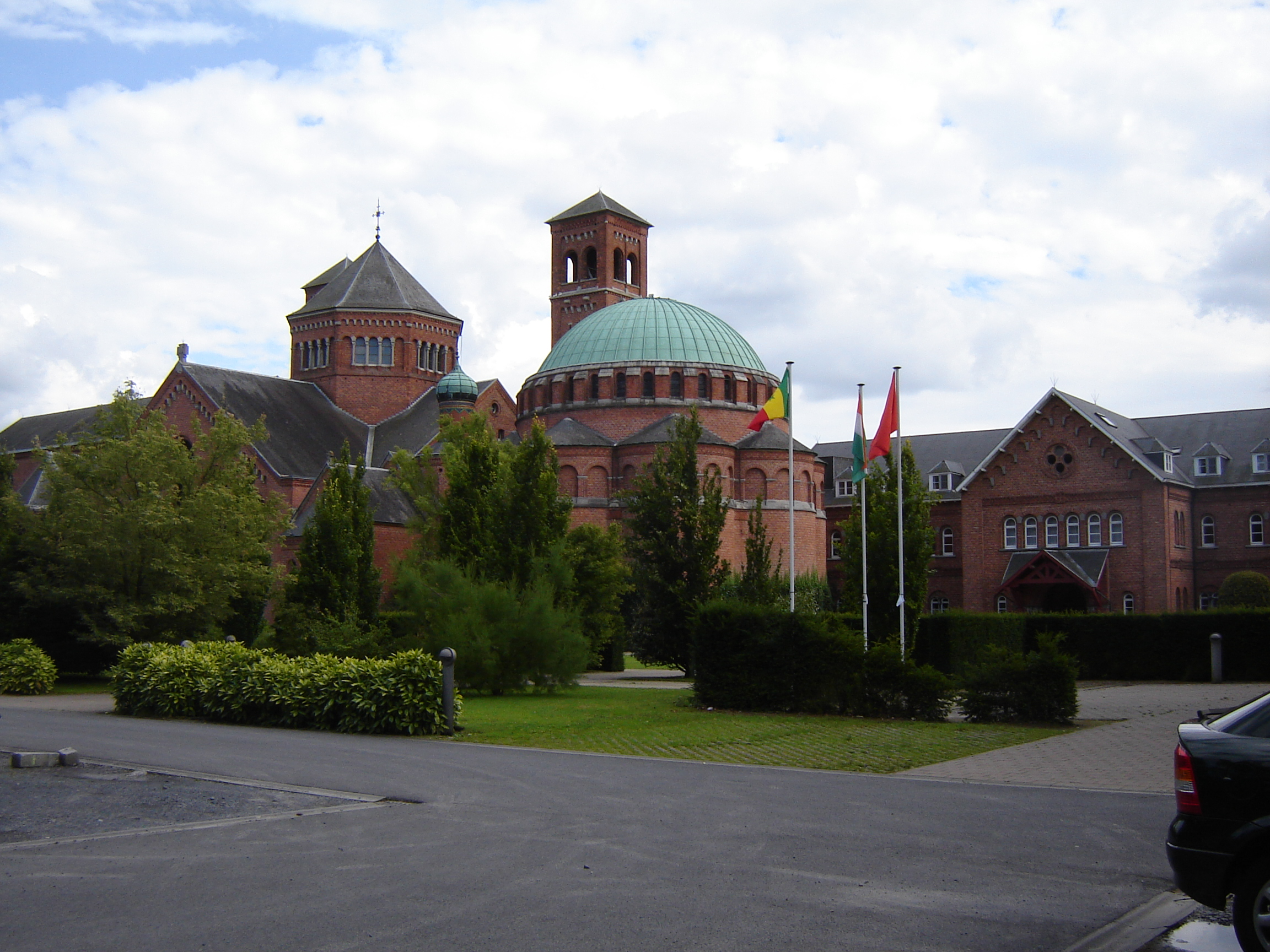
Sint-Andriesabdij Zevenkerken

The first Benedictines came from Portugal to Brazil in 1581. In 1822 when Brazil became independent from Portugal, the Holy See directed the constitution of the Brazilian Congregation. The Brazilian Benedictine Congregation had been gradually declining due to anticlerical legislation in 1855 which forbade the Brazilian monasteries to accept novices. When the law was changed in 1889 it opened the way for a possible recovery. The Abbot President of the Brazilian Congregation, Domingos Machado, asked Pope Leo XIII to request help from one of the other Benedictine congregations.

In 1893 Caloen was commissioned by Pope Leo XIII to restore the monastic life of his fellow Benedictines in Brazil. Caloen was sent with fellow monk Jerome Kiene, to assess the situation in Brazil, having first stopped at Portugal to study the language. They arrived in early 1894, and returned in July to report their findings to the General Chapter of the Beuronese Congregation which convened at Maredsous.

Caloen established St. Andrew's Abbey, Zevenkerken near the site of the old St. Andrew's Abbey in Bruges, which had been destroyed during the French Revolution. His uncle, Léon Ockerhout, donated seven acres of the Beisbroek area for the construction of an abbey complex, which was built in 1899–1900. St. Andrew's was established to train monks for the missions. He held the position of abbot until 1912.

In 1895, Caloen, and a group of monks from Maredsous arrived at the Monastery of St. Benedict, Olinda to begin the work of restoring it. In July Abbot Primate Hildebrand de Hemptinne appointed Caloen Prior of Olinda Monastery and in May 1896 Abbot. In December 1898 Pope Leo XIII published an apostolic letter shifting the focus Caloen's work from monastic restoration to missionary work, a change criticized throughout the Beuronese Congregation, not least at Maredsous. In 1899 he was named general vicar of the Brazilian congregation in 1899. In 1902 Caloen persuaded the Missionary Benedictine Sisters of Tutzing to come to Olinda. Arriving in June 1903, they immediately began to care for orphans and the sick.

In December 1899 Caloen was made vicar general of the Abbot General of the Brazilian Benedictine Congregation, Domingos Machado, with the right of succession. Caloen was made Abbot President of the Brazilian Congregation in 1900. He intended to assume the Abbey of Rio in May 1903, but the abbot still residing there refused; he finally succeeded with help from the military. On February 28, 1905, he was transferred from Olinda to the Abbey of São Bento do Rio de Janeiro. In September of that year, he returned to Belgium to recruit monks for Brazil.

=== Bishop ===
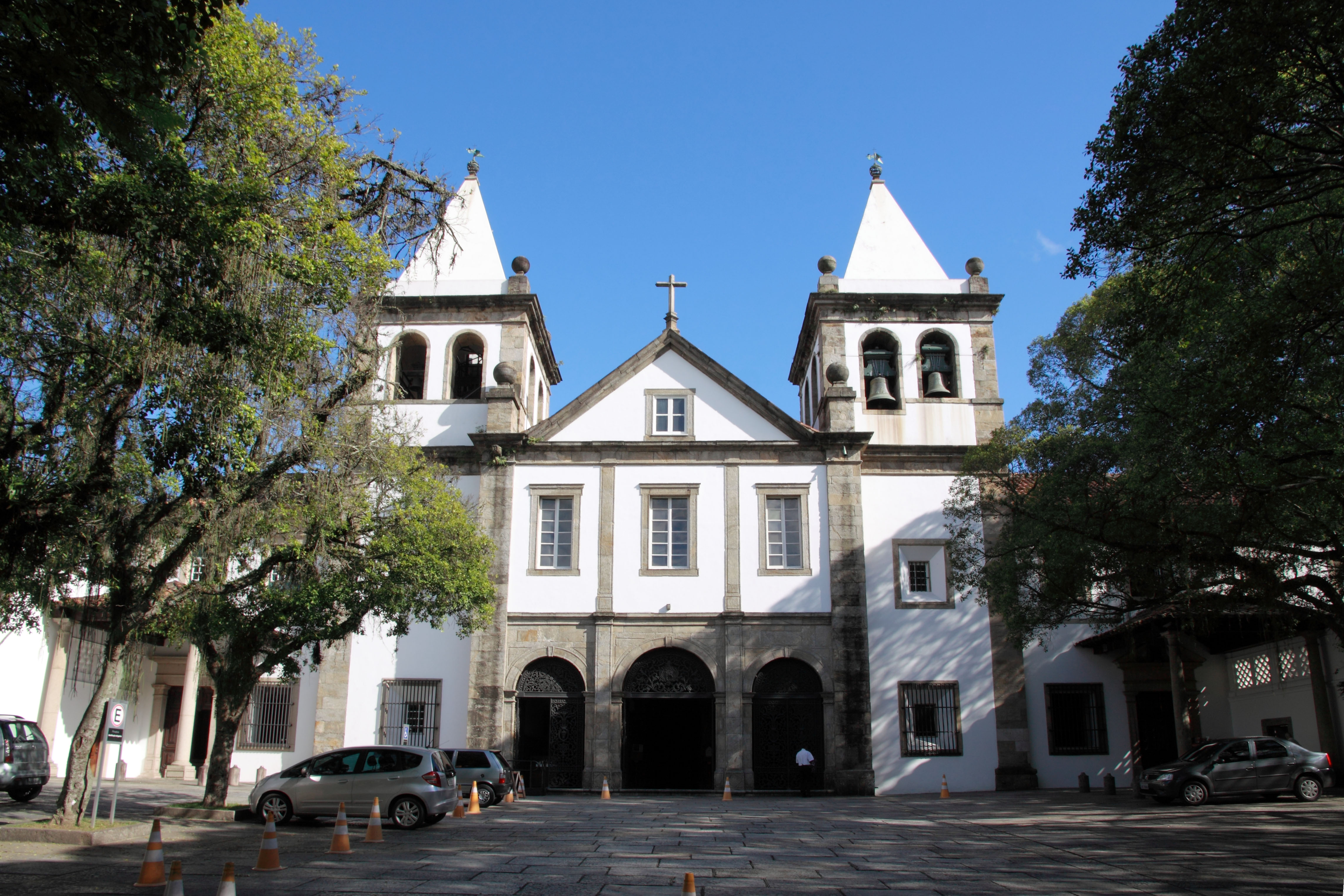
Mosteiro de São Bento do Rio de Janeiro - Fachada

Caloen was made bishop of the mission district of Rio Branco with the titular of Phocea. He received episcopal consecration on April 28, 1906, in Maredsous and returned to Brazil in July. Besides the mission at Rio Branco, the monks had charge of the church at Alto Boa Vista, and extended pastoral care to the naval base on the Ilha das Cobras, as well as the garrison, prison, and hospital. They also supervised a primary, secondary, and night school for adults. By a Decree of the Sacred Congregation of the Consistory, 15 August 1907, Santa Maria de Monserrato was erected into a territorial abbey. The same Decree separated the District of Rio Branco from the Diocese of Amazones and subjected it to the jurisdiction of the Abbot of Santa Maria de Monserrato. On September 6, 1908, Caloen was elected Archabbot of the Brazilian Congregation. He resided at Rio de Janeiro.

After the outbreak of World War I, he resigned from all offices in March 1915, but remained Vicar General of the Apostolic Administrator Laurentius Zeller in the Rio Branco mission area. In August 1919 he returned to Europe permanently for health reasons. At the arrival of Dom Gérard van Caloen in Brazil 1895, the Congregation counted no more than eleven monks. At his departure they were 261.

He lived for a brief time at the abbey of St. Andrew, and was to some extent involved in the canonical erection of the Congregation of the Annunciation in 1920. Unable to tolerate the weather of his homeland, he was compelled to retire to a more pleasant climate in the south of France. He spent the last years of his life in Cap d'Antibes, southern France, writing. He died there in 1932, and was buried at St. Andrew's.
