= Eleutherius Winance =

Belgian Benedictine monk and philosophy professor (1909–2009)

Personal life
- Born: 10 July 1909 Belgium
- Died: 15 August 2009 (aged 100) Lancaster, California, United States
- Resting place: St. Andrew's Abbey
- Notable work: The Communist Persuasion: A Personal Experience of Brainwashing
- Education: Catholic University of Leuven

Religious life
- Religion: Catholic
- Order: Benedictines
- Founder of: St. Andrew's Abbey
- Philosophy: Thomism
- Profession: Philosopher

Eleutherius Winance (10 July 1909 – 15 August 2009) was a Belgian-born Benedictine monk and philosophy professor. Winance was the last surviving founders of St. Andrew's Abbey in Valyermo, California. He taught philosophy at Claremont Graduate University for 38 years.

== Early life ==
Winance was born in Belgium on 10 July 1909. He was named for St. Eleutherius, the patron saint of freedom. He joined St. Andre's Monastery when he was 17 years old. He obtained a doctorate in philosophy in 1934 from the Catholic University of Louvain in Belgium.

== Benedictine Monk ==
=== Western China ===
Winance was ordained a Roman Catholic priest in 1936. The Benedictine order sent him to China that same year. Winance and two other priests then established a monastery in Sichuan province. In 1937, Winance helped to found both a Catholic elementary school and a seminary for the new Diocese of Nanchong (traditionally known as Diocese of Shunqing), which was established in 1929.

Winance and the other Benedictine monks were isolated during the second Sino-Japanese War, which lasted from 1937 until 1945, the end of World War II. They relocated the monastery to the Sichuan capital city of Chengdu following World War II. The monks opened the Institute of Chinese and Western Cultural Studies in Chengdu. The institute's library eventually contained more than 10,000 books and other publications.

The city of Chengdu, which was the last stronghold of the Chinese Nationalists, fell to Mao Zedong's Communist forces on 25 December 1949. The Communist authorities shuttered the Institute of Chinese and Western Cultural Studies and confiscated the books in its library. Father Winance and the other monks were forced to attend indoctrination sessions on Marxist philosophy.

Winance was accused by police in 1952 of being a member of the Legion of Mary, which the Chinese government alleged was a seditious organization. Winance, along with six priests and five nuns of foreign origin, were expelled from China. The group travelled nearly 3,000 miles under armed guard by bus, train, junk and foot to Guangzhou and then the British controlled colony of Hong Kong. Two Chinese Catholic Benedictine monks remained in China, one of which spent 27 years in prison.

=== United States ===
Following his expulsion from China, Winance was sent to Rome, where he taught philosophy at Sant'Anselmo, a Benedictine college, for four years. In 1958, he published a book of his experiences during the Chinese Communist Revolution entitled, The Communist Persuasion: A Personal Experience of Brainwashing. He next went to St. John's University, Minnesota. In California, he taught in the Claremont Colleges graduate program in philosophy and at St. John's Seminary College in Camarillo.

== See also ==
- Catholic Church in Sichuan

== Reading list ==
- Doyle, Paula. "Fr. Eleutherius Winance, Benedictine monk, dies at 100." The Tidings. 21 August 2009, p. 4. (The Tidings is the Catholic newspaper of the Archdiocese of Los Angeles.)
- Winance, Eleutherius. The Communist Persuasion: A Personal Experience of Brainwashing. Translated by Emeric A. Lawrence. (New York: P. J. Kennedy & Sons, 1958)
- Woo, Elaine. "Longtime professor of philosophy; Father Eleutherius Winance, 1909–2009." Los Angeles Times, 21 August 2009, A32.
- Winance, R.P. Èleuthère, Questions D’Èpistémologie, (Belgique: Cefal, 2001).
