= Jan Breydel Stadium =

Football stadium in Bruges, Belgium

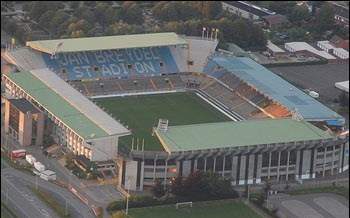
- Interactive map of Jan Breydel Stadium
- Former names: Olympiastadion
- Location: Koning Leopold III-laan 50, Sint-Andries, Bruges, Belgium
- Coordinates: 51°11′36″N 3°10′50″E
- Owner: Bruges
- Capacity: 29,062
- Surface: Mixto Hybrid Grass Technology
- Field size: 105 x 68m

Construction
- Built: 1975
- Opened: 1975
- Renovated: 1987, 1993, 1998–1999, 2002, 2010, 2011, 2012, 2015, 2016
- Expanded: 1998

Tenants
- Club Brugge; Cercle Brugge

Jan Breydel Stadium (Dutch: Jan Breydelstadion, pronounced [jɑm ˈbrɛidəlˌstaːdijɔn]) is a multi-purpose stadium in Sint-Andries, Bruges, Belgium. The city-owned stadium is the home stadium of two top-flight association football clubs and rivals, Club Brugge and Cercle Brugge. It is used mainly for football matches, which cost between €5 and €60/seat/match. The stadium was built in 1975. It currently has 29,042 seats. It is named after Jan Breydel, an instigator of the Bruges Matins, the insurgency that led to the 1302 Battle of the Golden Spurs. Prior to 1999 and the Euro 2000 Championship, the stadium was known as Olympiastadion [oːˈlɪmpijaːˌstaːdijɔn] or simply Olympia and had 18,000 seats. During December 2015, the pitch was resurfaced with an Italian proprietary hybrid grass (a mix of natural and artificial grass) called Mixto.

== Average attendances ==
Below are the average season attendances from league matches held at the Jan Breydel for Cercle Brugge and Club Brugge. Attendance for matches of the latter has been much higher than those of Cercle Brugge.

Season	Cercle Brugge	Club Brugge
1990–91	3,941	12,500
1991–92	3,659	11,970
1992–93	3,659	11,529
1993–94	3,647	10,176
1994–95	3,312	10,618
1995–96	4,129	14,176
1996–97	4,021	13,824
1997–98	?	13,676
1998–99	?	12,324
1999–2000	?	14,249
2000–01	?	16,265
2001–02	1,491	17,854
2002–03	2,506	20,976
2003–04	5,103	23,716
2004–05	5,156	24,432
2005–06	5,945	25,329
2006–07	6,552	25,034
2007–08	10,101	26,368
2008–09	10,502	26,085
2009–10	8,833	24,368
2010–11	7,775	24,113
2011–12	8,509	24,368
2012–13	8,459	24,433
2013–14	7,536	25,378
2014–15	7,462	26,000
2015–16	4,725	26,129
2016–17	3,285	26,828
2017–18	5,667	26,183
2018–19	5,658	24,399
2019–20	4,654	25,262
2020–21	156	1,629
2021–22	3,046	18,396
2022–23	4,465	20,987
2023–24	5,404	20,876

== Euro 2000 Matches ==
Date		Result		Round
11 June 2000	France	3–0	Denmark	Group D
16 June 2000	Czech Republic	1–2	France	Group D
21 June 2000	FR Yugoslavia	3–4	Spain	Group C
25 June 2000	Spain	1–2	France	Quarter-finals
