= Brazilian Congregation =

The Brazilian Congregation is a monastic congregation of the order of Saint Benedict. Founded in 1827, it is a member of the Benedictine Confederation.

== History ==
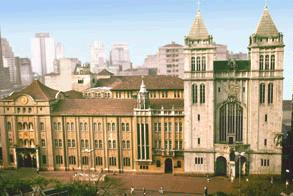
São Bento Abbey, São Paulo

The first Benedictines came from Portugal to Brazil in 1581, and the following year founded a monastery at Salvador da Bahia. As new foundations continued to be made, the monastery at Bahia became the provincial headquarters; the abbot served as the Provincial and Visitor.

In 1822 Brazil became independent from Portugal, and the Holy See, with the papal seal Inter gravissimas 1827, ordered the constitution of the Brazilian congregation. However, subsequent anticlerical legislation forbade the Brazilian monasteries to accept novices. By the end of the nineteenth century the Brazilian Congregation had been slowly dying. A change in government policy in 1889 reversed the earlier prohibitions. At that time the entire congregation numbered only about twelve members, of whom eight were abbots of over seventy years of age.

The Abbot President of the Brazilian Congregation, Frei Domingos da Transfiguração Machado, appealed to Pope Leo XIII for help, asking him to solicit the aid of one of the European Benedictine congregations.

In 1893 Dom Gerard van Caloen (1853-1932), a monk of Maredsous Abbey, was commissioned by Pope Leo XIII to restore the monastic life of his fellow Benedictines in Brazil. In 1895, Caloen, and a group of monks from Maredsous arrived at the Abbey of São Bento in Olindo to begin the work of restoring it. This work was completed in 1910 with the promulgation of new Constitutions.

Caloen was appointed Abbot of São Bento at Olinda on 20 May 1896, and general vicar of the Brazilian congregation in 1899. In 1898 Caloen, founded a new monastic community for the specific intention of training missionaries. His uncle donated the land. The new monastery, St. Andrew's Abbey, Zevenkerken (Dutch: Sint-Andriesabdij van Zevenkerken), was built in 1899–1900. In 1901, St. Andrew's Abbey was incorporated into the Brazilian Congregation, but was detached from it in 1920 to form the Congregation of the Annunciation.

As of 2019, the congregation had 7 monasteries with 198 monks, 82 of whom are priests. Since 2013 the Benedictines of Brazil are present also in Italy.

As of 2025, the congregation comprised 8 male monasteries and 16 female monasteries, with a total of 137 monks and 247 nuns.

== Archabbots ==
- Gerard van Caloen, (1908-1915)
- Chrysostom de Saegher, (1915-1920)
- José da Santa Escolastica Faria (1920 -

== Monasteries ==
- Archabbey of Sao Sebastiao/ Monastery of St. Benedict, Salvador da Bahia (1581)
- Monastery of St. Benedict, Olinda (1586)
- The Abbey of Our Lady of Montserrat, Rio de Janeiro (1589)
- Monastery of São Bento, São Paulo (1598)
- Priory of São Bento, Fortaleza (1993), incorporated in the congregation in 2025.

The Abbey of the Resurrection in Ponta Grossa was founded from São Paulo in 1981, and is part of the Hispanic Province of the Subiaco Cassinese Congregation.
