= São Bento Monastery =

Benedictine abbey in Rio de Janeiro, Brazil

Abbey of Our Lady of Montserrat
- Abadia de Nossa Senhora do Monserrate
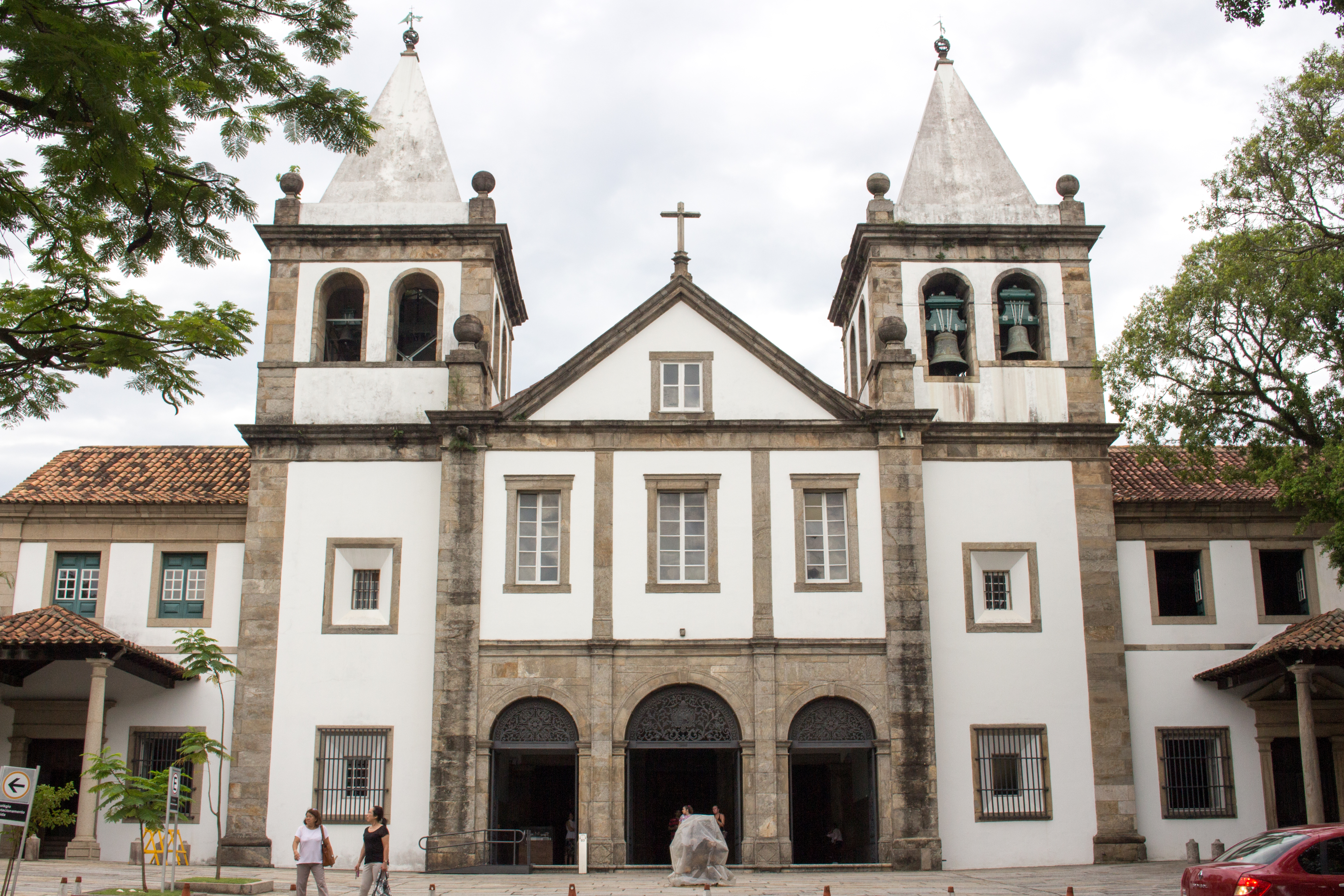
- Facade of the abbey church

- Location within Rio de Janeiro
- Interactive map of Abbey of Our Lady of Montserrat

Monastery information
- Other names: Mosteiro de São Bento, Mosteiro de São Bento de Nossa Senhora da Conceição
- Order: Benedictine
- Established: 1590
- Mother house: Arquiabadia de São Sebastião da Bahia
- Diocese: Rio de Janeiro

People
- Abbot: Filipe da Silva

Architecture
- Style: Mannerist
- Groundbreaking: 1633
- Completion date: 1671

Site
- Location: R. Dom Gerardo, 68 - Centro, Rio de Janeiro, Rio de Janeiro, 20090-030
- Coordinates: 22°53′48″S 43°10′40″W
- Website: mosteirodesaobentorio.org.br

The Abbey of Our Lady of Montserrat (Portuguese: Abadia de Nossa Senhora do Monserrate), more commonly known as the Mosteiro de São Bento (Monastery of St. Benedict), is a Benedictine abbey located on the Morro de São Bento (St. Benedict Hill) in downtown Rio de Janeiro, Brazil. The Mannerist style church is a primary example of Portuguese colonial architecture in Rio and the country.

The abbey was founded by Benedictine monks who came from the state of Bahia in 1590. It is still operational today, along with the Colégio de São Bento (St. Benedict College) nearby. The college, established in 1858, is one of the most important traditional educational establishments in Brazil and claims many famous alumni. The abbey includes the Faculdade de São Bento (St. Benedict Seminary), with courses in theology and philosophy that are recognized by the Ministry of Education. Theological studies at the monastery are also affiliated with the Pontifical Atheneum of St. Anselm in Rome.

== History ==
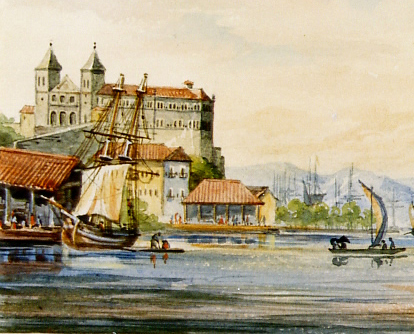
A painting from 1841 by the French artist, Jules de Sinety, showing the port of Rio and the Mosteiro de São Bento on top of the hill of the same name.

The history of the abbey began in 1590 when Manoel de Brito and his son Diogo de Brito de Lacerda donated land for its construction in downtown Rio de Janeiro to Pedro Ferraz and João Porcalho, Benedictine monks from Bahia. At the time, the monks were residing in a simple inn next to the Chapel of Nossa Senhora da Conceição (Our Lady of the Conception) near what is now called the Morro de São Bento . Because of this, the monastery adopted Our Lady of the Conception as its patron saint. St. Benedict was later added as an additional patron saint, and namesake, by order of the Junta Geral da Congregação Portuguesa (General Board of the Portuguese Congregation) in 1596. In 1602, the then-titled, "Mosteiro de São Bento de Nossa Senhora da Conceição" changed its name to "Mosteiro de Nossa Senhora de Montserrat" in homage to the saint to which the governor of the Captaincy of Rio de Janeiro, Francisco de Souza, was devoted.

The financial resources necessary to construct the monastery came from income obtained through the production of sugarcane on the multiple properties controlled by the monks. All charitable donations, these tracts of land extended throughout the Captaincy of Rio de Janeiro, particularly in the regions of Nova Iguaçu and Campos dos Goytacazes. African slaves provided the physical labor required to build the monastery. The stones used in its construction were mined from the Morro da Viúva (Widow's Hill), in the neighborhood of Flamengo.

Anticlerical legislation in 1855 forbade the Brazilian monasteries to accept novices. By the end of the nineteenth century the Brazilian Congregation had been slowly dying. A change in government policy in 1889 reversed the earlier prohibitions. The Abbot President of the Brazilian Congregation, Frei Domingos da Transfiguração Machado, appealed to Pope Leo XIII for help, asking him to solicit the aid of one of the European Benedictine congregations. In 1893 Gerard van Caloen (1853-1932), a monk of Maredsous Abbey, was commissioned by Pope Leo XIII to help restore the monastic life of his fellow Benedictines in Brazil.

Caloen was appointed Abbot of São Bento at Olinda on 20 May 1896, and general vicar of the Brazilian congregation in 1899. In February 1905, he was transferred to the monastery of Our Lady of Montserrat, in Rio de Janeiro. By a decree of the Sacred Congregation of the Consistory, 15 August 1907, Santa Maria de Monserrato was erected into an abbey nullius. The same decree separated the District of Rio Branco from the Diocese of Amazones and subjected it to the jurisdiction of the Abbot of Santa Maria de Monserrato.

Pedro Eggerath was elected abbot in 1915. Besides the mission at Rio Branco, the monks had charge of the church at Alto Boa Vista, and extended pastoral care to the naval base on the Ilha das Cobras, as well as the garrison, prison, and hospital. They also supervised a primary, secondary, and night school for adults.

== Architecture ==
Portuguese military engineer, Francisco Frias de Mesquita, drew up the plans for the building and oversaw its construction in 1617. The Mannerist style, popular in Portugal at the time, provided the aesthetic inspiration for the structure. Work on the church began in 1633, under the guidance of Abbott Francisco da Magdalena, with a plan to finish in 1671. The original plans were altered during construction by the architect Bernardo de São Bento Correia de Souza to include three naves. The annex of the church was only completed in 1755, with the installation of a convent designed by military engineer José Fernandes Pinto Alpoim.

The façade was part of the original Mannerist project and featured a centralized edifice with three archways at the entrance, as well as a triangular gable. Two towers crowned by pyramidal spires flanked the entryway. After passing through the entrance archway, the building houses a tiled porch and iron gates from the nineteenth century.

Located on top of a hill, it became a point of reference for navigators. King João VI established the Academia Real de Marinha (Royal Navak Academy) at São Bento.

== Interior ==
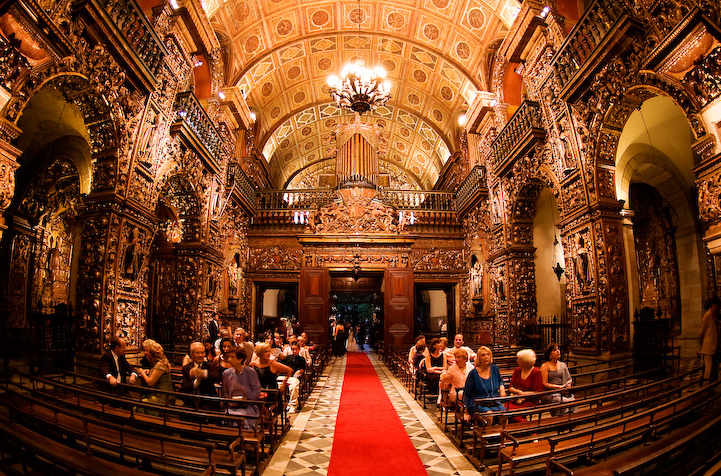
Interior of the abbey church

The interior of the church is ornately covered in gold leaf gilding, a style popularized during the Baroque period of the seventeenth century and the Rococo period of the eighteenth century. The first sculptor commissioned for the church was the Portuguese monk, Domingos da Conceição (c. 1643 - 1718). He designed and sculpted part of the gilding in the nave and the main chapel (although his part of the chapel was later replaced). Conceição was also responsible for the statues of Benedict of Nursia and Scholastica and, in the main altar of the church, Our Lady of Mount Serrat (namesake of the church). After 1714, Alexandre Machado Pereira, Simão da Cunha, and José da Conceição e Silva continued the work of Conceição and did the etching in the nave.

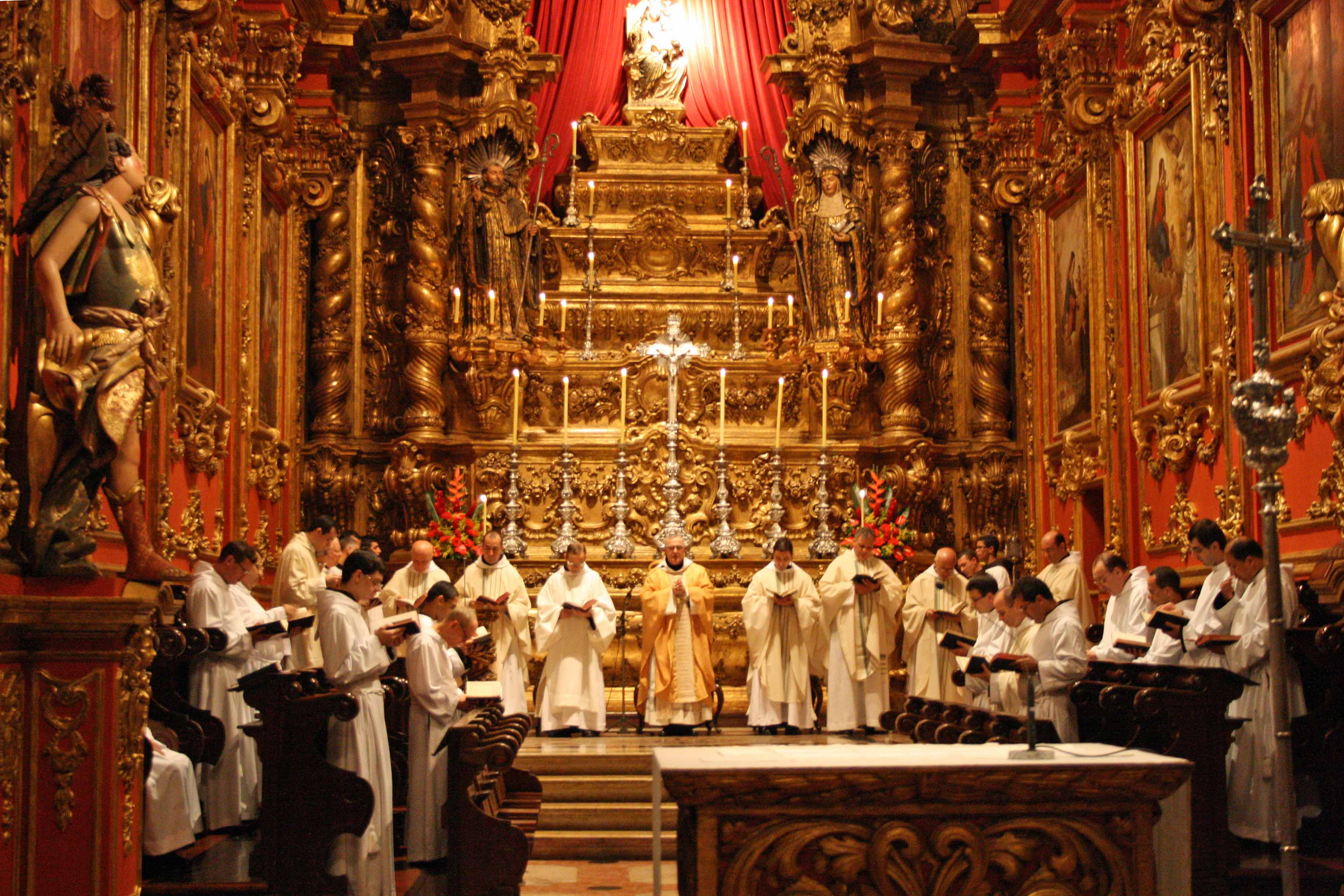
Main altar during Midnight Mass 2009

Between 1789 and 1800, one of the greatest Rococo sculptors in Rio de Janeiro, Inácio Ferreira Pinto, worked in the Mosteiro de São Bento. Pinto re-did the main chapel (1787-1794) but preserved the original design details. One feature preserved by Pinto were the tiles depicting the lives of Benedictine saints, which were painted between 1676 and 1684 by German friar Ricardo do Pilar. The Rococo-styled Chapel of the Holy Sacrament (1795 - 1800) remains one of Pinto's masterpieces. The chandeliers in the chapel were crafted by Master Valentim between 1781 and 1783. A masterpiece by painter Friar Ricardo representing the Lord of Martyrs (c. 1690) hangs in the sacristy of the monastery.

Inside the church, there are seven side chapels dedicated to Catholic lay brotherhoods: Chapel of Our Lady of the Immaculate Conception, Chapel of St. Lawrence, Chapel of St. Gertrude, Chapel of St. Braz, Chapel of St. Caetano, Chapel of Our Lady of Pilar, and Chapel of St. Amaro. Guided tours are available that explain the artwork, imagery, carvings, and architectural styles featured in the church.

Ricardo do Pilar's 1690 "Christ in Martyrdom" hangs in the sacristy; it was most recently restored in 1992.

== Administration ==
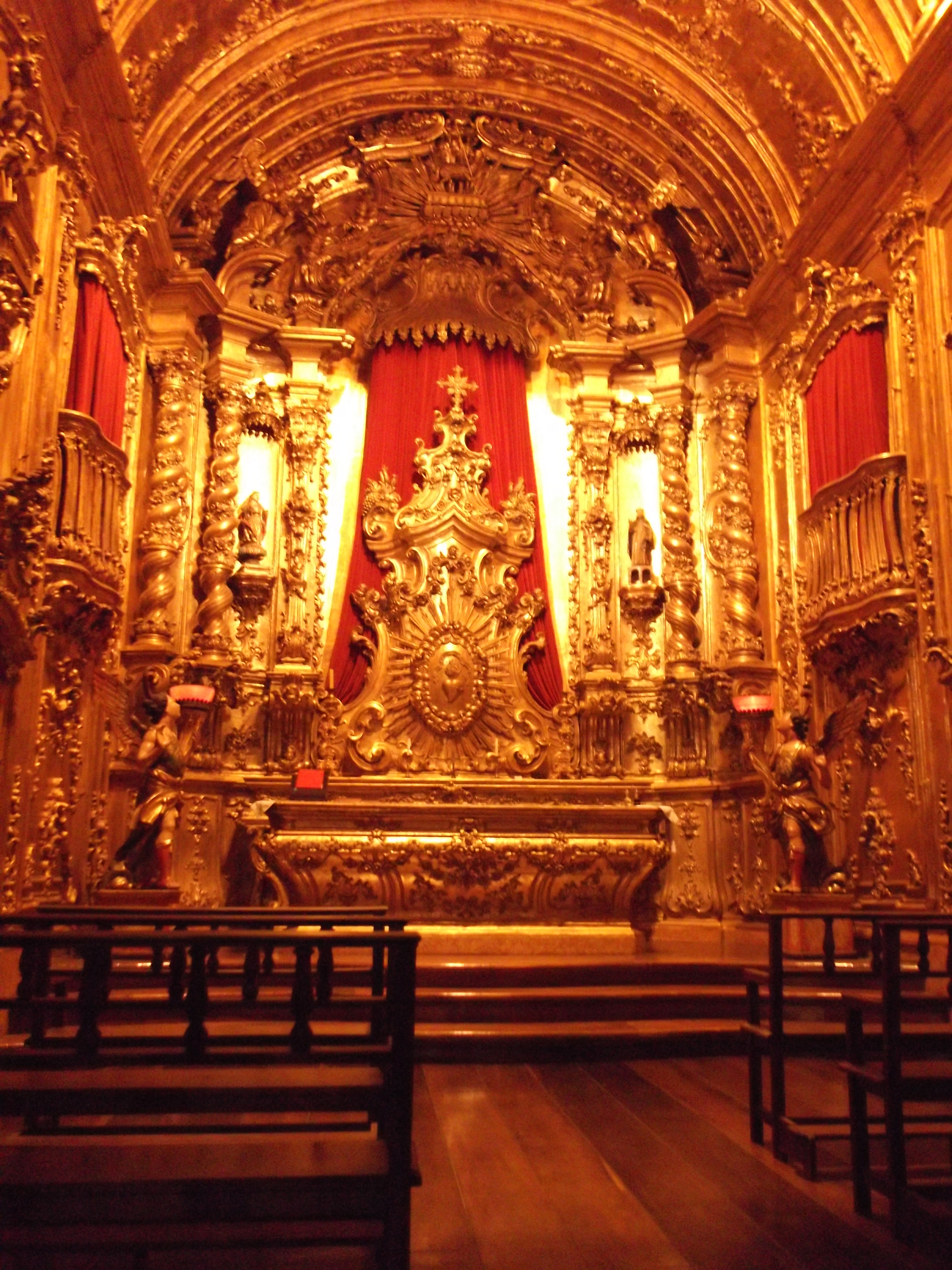
Chapel of the Blessed Sacrament

The abbey was one of the few remaining territorial abbeys in the world until 2003, when it was incorporated into the Archdiocese of St. Sebastian of Rio de Janeiro.

The current abbot for the Mosteiro de São Bento in Rio de Janeiro is Filipe da Silva. He was assigned to his post by the Holy See on November 3, 2012 and entered into office on December 1 of the same year. The monastery claims two emeritus abbots: José Palmeiro Mendes, predecessor to da Silva (1992-2003) and Roberto Lopes (2004-2010).

Other monks associated with the church include:

- Anselmo Chagas de Paiva
- Basílio Silva
- Beda Gonçalves de Andrade Silva
- Cipriano Cintra Chagas
- Eduardo de Souza Schulz
- Emanuel Oliveira de Almeida
- Gregório Pereira Lima
- Henrique de Gouvêa Coelho
- Justino de Almeida Bueno
- Matias Fonseca de Medeiros
- Paulo Soares de Azevedo Coutinho
- Plácido Lopes de Oliveira
- João Batista Estevo Ferreira (deacon)
- Irmão Adalberto Chalub (lay brother)
- Agostinho de Oliveira Martins (lay brother)

== Hours of Operation ==
Traditional Sunday mass at the Mosteiro de São Bento begins at 10am and is celebrated with organ music and Gregorian chanting. The monastery attracts many visitors and has become part of sightseeing tours in the city of Rio de Janeiro. Services tend to be crowded so it is recommended that visitors arrive early. The monastery regularly features performances by orchestras and chamber musical groups.

== See also ==
- Colégio de São Bento
- Portuguese colonial architecture in Brazil
