= St. Andrew's Abbey =

Monastery in Los Angeles County, California, United States

- Interactive map of St. Andrew's Abbey

Monastery information
- Order: Benedictine
- Established: 1955
- Mother house: Sint Andries, Zevenkerken, Belgium
- Dedication: Saint Andrew
- Archdiocese: Los Angeles

People
- Founders: Jehan Joliet, OSB; Eleutherius Winance, OSB
- Abbot: Damien Toilolo, OSB
- Prior: Joseph Brennan, OSB

Site
- Location: Valyermo, California, United States
- Coordinates: 34°27′36″N 117°51′50″W
- Public access: Yes
- Website: www.saintandrewsabbey.com

St. Andrew's Abbey is a male Benedictine monastery of the Congregation of the Annunciation located in Valyermo, in the Mojave Desert, northern Los Angeles County, southern California.

== History ==
In 1929, St. Andrew's Abbey in Bruges, Belgium founded St. Andrew's Priory in the Diocese of Shunqing, Sichuan, western China, and until 1953, the monks of the Priory conducted missionary work among the local people.

In 1953, the Chinese communists expelled all foreign priests as well as all religious brothers and sisters from the country. Forced to leave China behind, in 1955 the monks purchased the Hidden Springs Ranch where the monastery is now located. St. Andrew's Priory thus began its ministry in Valyermo, which is located in the High Desert of Southern California and within the boundaries of the Archdiocese of Los Angeles. It is not far from the communities of Palmdale, Lancaster and Wrightwood, California.

=== Priory to Abbey ===
In 1992, St. Andrew's Priory became an abbey. Father Francis Benedict, OSB was elected first abbot of St. Andrew's Abbey and received the abbatial blessing on August 2, 1992. Francis Benedict, served as abbot for sixteen years during which he served with unflagging devotion as shepherd of the monastery. The new Welcome Center and Youth Center Chapel are the most recent and visible reminders of Abbot Francis’ deep commitment to the community. Abbot Francis stepped down in 2008 and became known as Abbot Emeritus. Greatly beloved, on 20 July 2024 Father Francis Benedict died.

== Programs ==
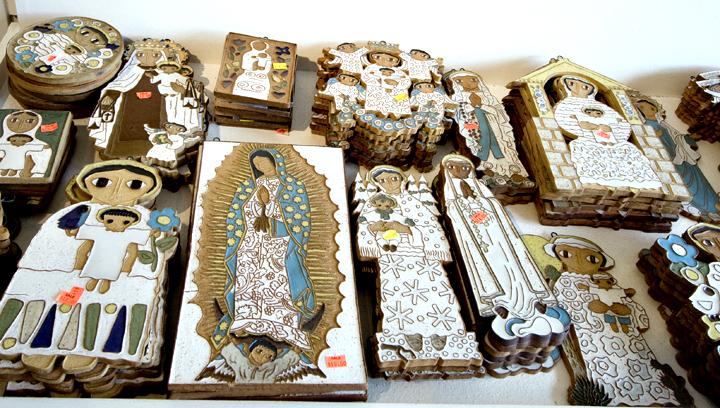
Ceramic angels produced by the abbey

St. Andrew's Abbey is well known as a retreat centre in California. The abbey is located in an isolated area which is conducive to silence. While the abbey does not care for any parishes, it welcomes numerous guests each year either as retreatants or as casual visitors. Additionally, the abbey is also known for its ceramics that it produces.

A number of the monks also teach at the seminary for the Catholic Archdiocese of Los Angeles and in colleges and universities in the Los Angeles area.

== Events ==
At the invitation of Abbot Ansgar Schmidt, O.S.B., the Abbot President of the Benedictine Congregation of the Annunciation, of which St. Andrew's Abbey is part, the monks at Valyermo began an intensive period of study and reflection in preparation for the election of a new abbot. On 21 June 2010, the community elected their prior, Damien Toilolo O.S.B., as abbot for an eight-year term.

From April 2009 until October 2011, the community of Saint Andrew's Abbey hosted a small group of Eastern Rite Catholic monks in search of property to establish their own monastery (called Holy Resurrection). In 2011, these Byzantine monks purchased a former convent in the village of Saint Nazianz in Manitowoc County, eastern Wisconsin.

== See also ==
- Catholic Church in Sichuan
