= Diocese of Shunqing =

Roman Catholic diocese in China

Diocese of Shunqing Dioecesis Scioenchimensis 天主教順慶教區 天主教顺庆教区
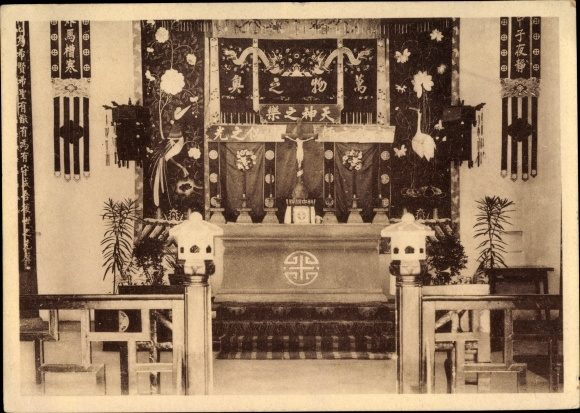
- Oratory of St. Andrew's Priory, established by Benedictine monks upon the creation of the Apostolic Vicariate of Shunking in 1929.

Location
- Country: China
- Ecclesiastical province: Chongqing
- Metropolitan: Chongqing

Statistics
- Area: 25,000 km^{2} (9,700 sq mi)
- Population: Total; Catholics: (as of 1950); 8,000,000; 19,442 (0.2%)

Information
- Denomination: Catholic Church
- Sui iuris church: Latin Church
- Rite: Roman Rite
- Established: August 2, 1929 (as apostolic vicariate)
- Cathedral: Sacred Heart of Jesus Cathedral, Nanchong

Current leadership
- Pope: Leo XIV
- Bishop: Joseph Chen Gong-ao
- Metropolitan Archbishop: Sede vacante

The Diocese of Shunqing (formerly spelled Shunking; Latin: Dioecesis Scioenchimensis; Chinese: 天主教順慶教區), also known as Diocese of Nanchong, is a suffragan Latin Catholic diocese in the ecclesiastical province of Chongqing in southwestern China, yet depends on the missionary Roman Congregation for the Evangelization of Peoples.

Established on August 2, 1929 as the Apostolic Vicariate of Shunking for the Mission of Sichuan (Szechwan), its episcopal see is the Cathedral of the Sacred Heart of Jesus, located in the Shunqing city center district of Nanchong, Sichuan province. No statistics available.

== Territory ==
The Diocese of Shunqing covers 34 cities and counties, including Bazhong (Pa-tcheou), Guang'an (Koang-gan-tcheou), Nanchong (Choen-kin-fou), Suining (Su-lin-hien), Ziyang (Tse-tcheou), and Dazhou (Su-tin-fou, formerly part of Eastern Szechwan Mission), totaling 25,000 square kilometers. It is bordered by the Diocese of Chengdu to the west, Diocese of Wanxian and Archdiocese of Chongqing to the east, Diocese of Hanzhong and Apostolic Prefecture of Xing'anfu to the north, and Diocese of Suifu to the south.

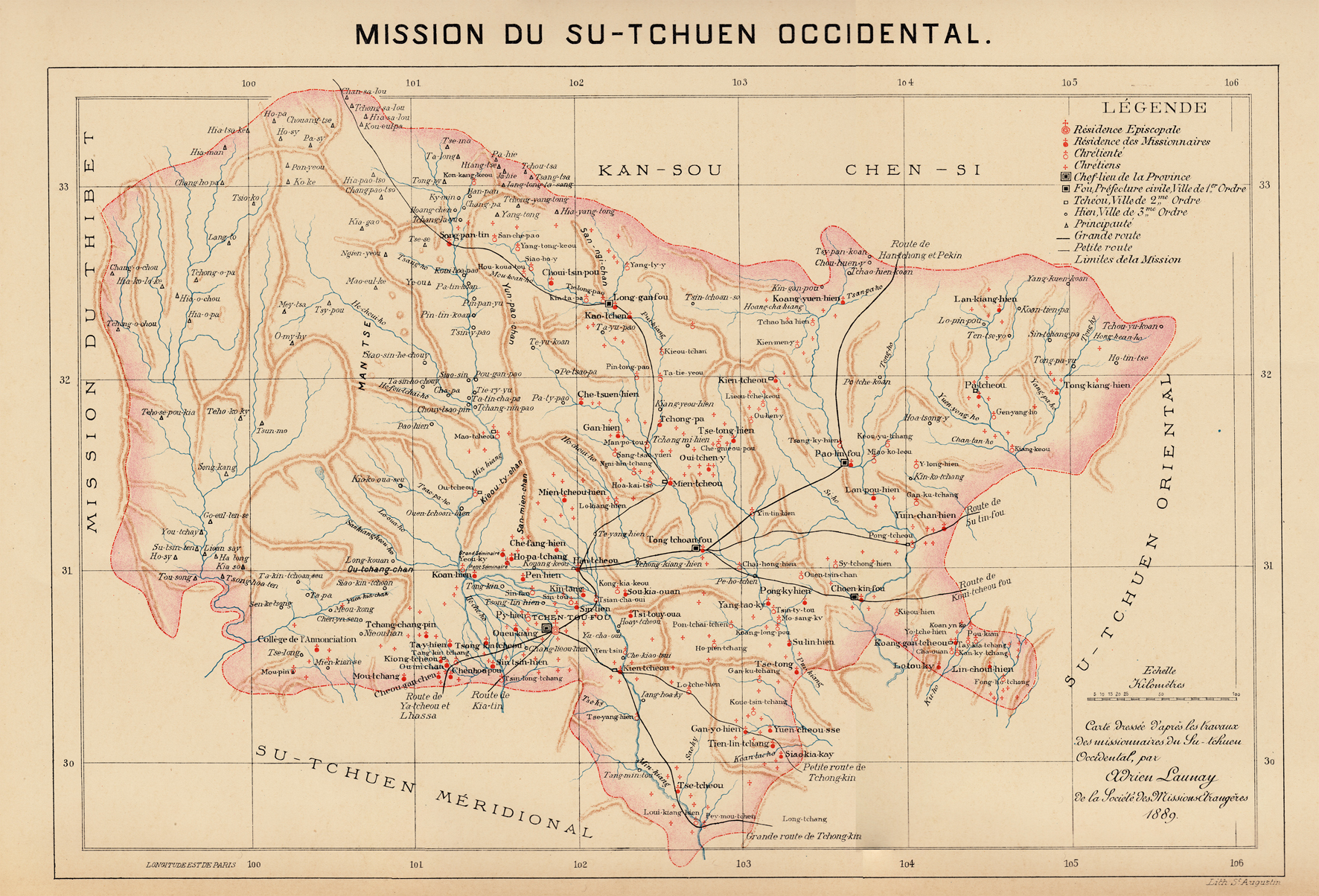
Shunqing Diocese was part of the Western Szechwan Mission; map prepared by Adrien Launay, 1889.

== History ==
- Established on August 2, 1929 as Apostolic Vicariate of Shunkingfu (Vicariatus Apostolicus Scioenchimensis; Choen-kin-fou; -fu meaning administrative prefecture), on territory split off from the then Apostolic Vicariate of Chengtu (Tchen-tou-fou)
- Promoted on April 11, 1946 and renamed after its see as Diocese of Shunking (Dioecesis Scioenchimensis).

== St. Andrew's Priory ==
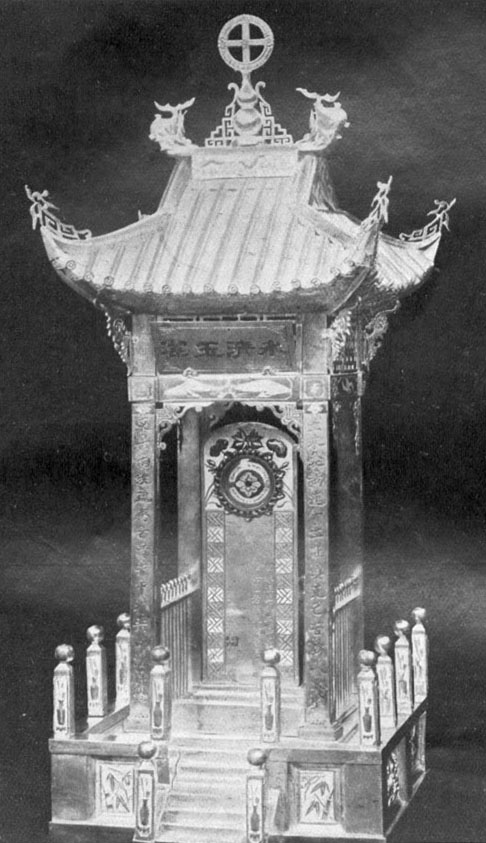
Reliquary of St. Thérèse of Lisieux preserved at St. Andrew's Priory, Xishan.

Upon the creation of the Apostolic Vicariate of Shunking, Benedictine monks from St. Andrew's Abbey, Bruges established the Priory of Saints Andrew and Peter at a site in the suburbs of Nanchong, known as Xishan (formerly romanized as Si-shan, lit. 'West Hill'), where a relic of Saint Thérèse of Lisieux was kept.

During the Second World War, the Benedictines served as auxiliary chaplains to the American soldiers stationed in this region. In 1942, it was felt that Chengdu, the capital city, would be a better place for a permanent priory. Therefore, in 1945, the Benedictines opened in that city the Institute of Chinese and Western Cultural Studies.

The priory was transferred to Chengdu and formally inaugurated on July 11, 1949. Nevertheless, it only stayed there for a brief time, until December 25, 1949, when the communist invasion reached the city. Eventually, the priory was re-established in Valyermo, California, known today as St. Andrew's Abbey.

== Episcopal ordinaries ==
All Roman Rite and native bishops.

Apostolic Vicar of Shunkingfu

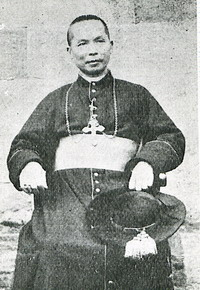
Paul Wang Wencheng, first Apostolic Vicar of Shunkingfu

- Paul Wang Wencheng (December 2, 1929 – April 11, 1946 see below)

Suffragan Bishop of Shunking

- Paul Wang Wencheng (see above April 11, 1946 – January 28, 1961)

Suffragan Bishops of Shunqing

- uncanonical: Fan Daojiang (1963 – death 1987.12.17), without papal mandate
- uncanonical: Michael Huang Woze (1989 – retired 2001), without papal mandate; died 2004
- Joseph Chen Gong-ao (2012 – ...)

== See also ==
- Anglican Diocese of Szechwan
- List of Catholic dioceses in China

== Sources and external links ==
- "Diocese of Shunqing — with Google map & data for all sections". gcatholic.org.
- "Diocese of Nanchong [Shunking]". catholic-hierarchy.org.
