= Sint-Andries =

Sub-municipality of the city of Bruges, Belgium

- Sub-municipality of Bruges
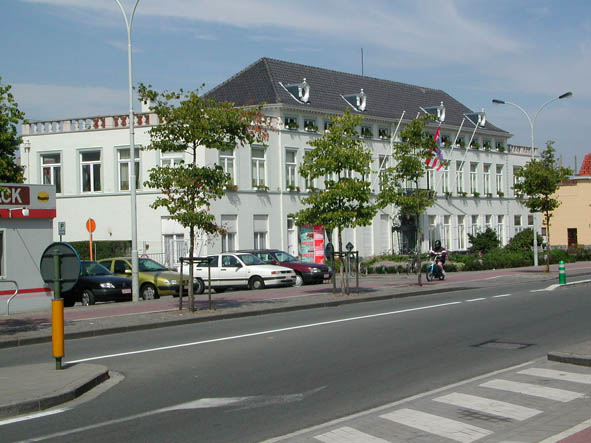
- Town hall

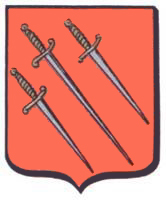
- Coat of arms
- Interactive map of Sint-Andries
- Location within Belgium Location within West Flanders
- Coordinates: 51°11′50″N 3°10′49″E
- Country: Belgium
- Community: Flemish Community
- Region: Flemish Region
- Province: West Flanders
- Arrondissement: Bruges
- Municipality: Bruges

Area
  - Total: 20.65 km^{2} (7.97 sq mi)

Population (2014-12-31)
  - Total: 19,818
  - Density: 959.7/km^{2} (2,486/sq mi)
- Postal codes: 8200
- Area codes: 050

Sint-Andries (Dutch pronunciation: [sɪnt ˈɑndris]) is a sub-municipality of the city of Bruges located in the province of West Flanders, Flemish Region, Belgium. It was a separate municipality until 1971. On 1 January 1971, it was merged into Bruges.

The Jan Breydel Stadium, where the football teams Club Brugge and Cercle Brugge play, is situated in Sint-Andries. There are also a lot of small castles, built by the nobility in the late 19th century, mostly in woody environments. It contains St. Andrew's Abbey, established in 1100.
