= Gaspar Lefebvre =

French monk (1880–1966)

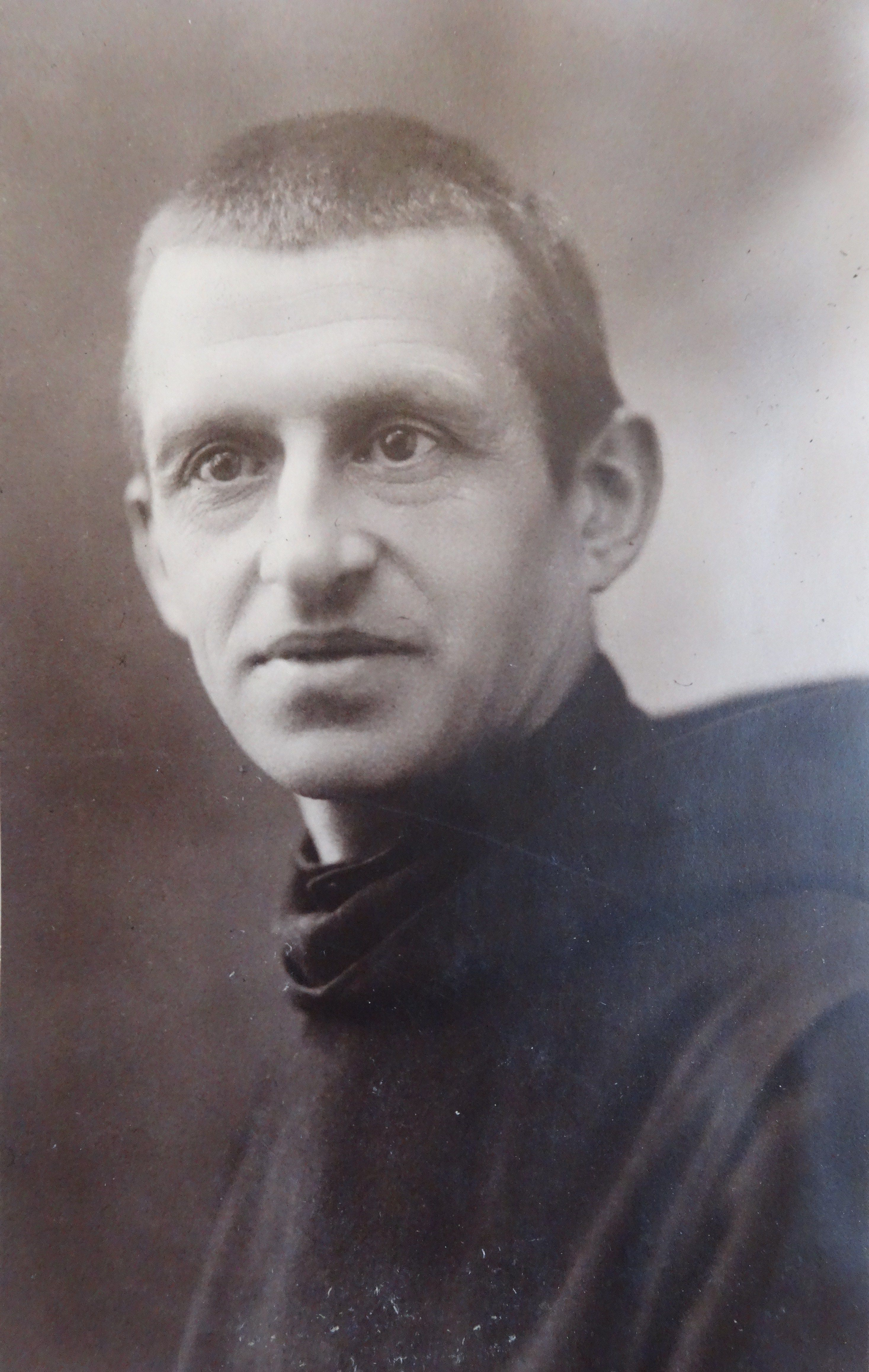
Dom Gaspar Lefebvre around 1910

Gaspar Lefebvre, OSB (17 June 1880 Lille, France – 16 April 1966 in Bruges, Belgium) was a French Catholic Benedictine monk and writer who specialized in Catholic liturgy.

== Life ==
Lefebvre studied at Maredsous Abbey and was ordained in 1904. He became prior (either "second in command" or the leader) of the Benedictine monastery of St. Andrew's Abbey, Zevenkerken near Bruges. The liturgy was his apostolate; he was heavily influenced by Prosper Guéranger. Lefebvre carried on the work of Lambert Beauduin, a leading member of the Belgian Liturgical movement, who had been influenced by Columba Marmion. Beauduin believed that liturgy was for the participation of the congregation. He promoted the active participation of people during the Mass by helping them to understand and follow the liturgical rites and texts.

Lefebvre made significant pastoral contributions to the liturgical movement by publishing from 1920 to 1959 bilingual missals from Latin into English, French, Dutch, and Italian. His work was widely used in English-speaking areas. It contributed greatly to the participation of the faithful in Sunday Mass and sung vespers.

== Works ==
- Saint Andrew Daily Missal The Irish Monthly called Lefebvre's Latin-English missal "one of the most useful we have come across for a long time." Besides all the Masses in the Roman Missal, it also contained Vespers and Compline for all Sundays and Holidays. "...there are invaluable doctrinal, liturgical, and historical notes by Dom Lefebvre, clearly and simply explained. It is beautifully printed and contains two hundred excellent engravings."
- The Liturgy: Its Fundamental Principles (1929) On The Liturgy: Its Fundamental Principles, the Irish quarterly Studies said, "Dom Lefebvre has so many wise things to say about the meaning, beauty, and importance of our Catholic liturgy that we gladly forget the less wise things which others have said and done...priests and lay-folk have much to learn from Dom Lefebvre and his book should be bought and read everywhere in Ireland."
- Catholic Liturgy (1926) "...a fine anthology of scriptural and patristic references to the liturgy...The liturgical movement...has no desire to make our Catholic people experts in the various rites...but rather to induce an appreciation of the Mass, of the sacraments and of the various feasts and seasons of the liturgical year...this work will supply the priest with a wealth of material...Nor will the interested layman read it without profit." The Catholoc World called it "excellent", acknowledging the Benedictines of Stanbrook Abbey for the translation.
