= St. Andrew's Abbey, Bruges =

Benedictine abbey in Bruges, Belgium

Coordinates: 51°09′35″N 3°09′32″E

St. Andrew's Abbey, Bruges (Dutch: Sint-Andriesabdij Brugge) was a Benedictine abbey in Sint-Andries, Bruges, Belgium, which was destroyed in the French Revolution. Its modern successor St. Andrew's Abbey, Zevenkerken (Dutch: Sint-Andriesabdij van Zevenkerken), founded in 1899–1900, is a Benedictine abbey of the Congregation of the Annunciation.

== History ==
=== St. Andrew's Abbey, Bruges ===
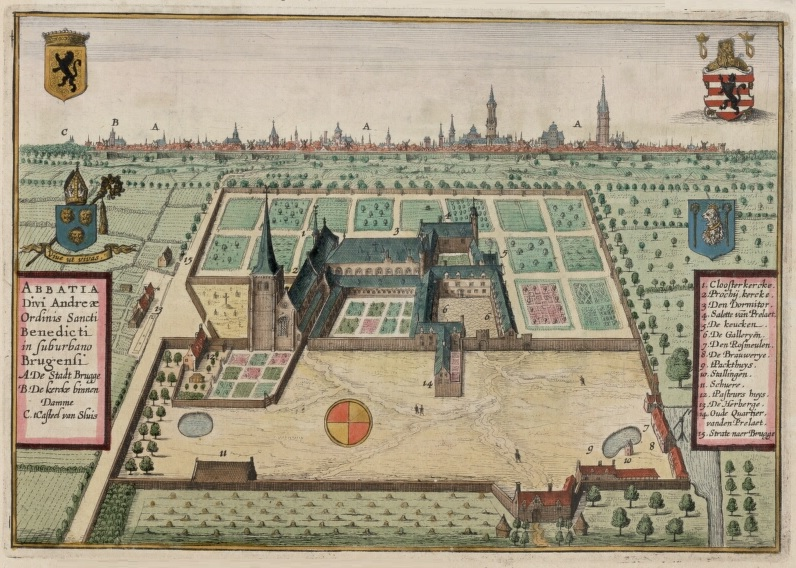
St. Andrew's Abbey, Bruges: hand-coloured engraving from Flandria Illustrata (Antonius Sanderus, 1641)

The Abbey of St. Andrew at Bruges was founded by Count Robert II of Flanders as a resuslt of a promise he had made should he survive the First Crusade. The foundation charter was signed on 22 February 1100 and ratified by Count Robert II of Flanders in June 1100. The monastery was built on what is now the site of the parish church of St. Andrew and St. Anne. The first monks arrived on 17 August 1117 from Affligem Abbey. In 1188, the priory was elevated to an abbey and became independent of Affligem, thus beginning a period of prosperity, which lasted until the 14th century. In 1240, after a long dispute between the abbot and the local parish priest, a wall was built in the church to divide it into two.

In 1350 the abbey sold a piece of ground right next to the abbey itself on which the charterhouse of Sint-Anna-ter-Woestijne was built. The abbey was severely damaged during the second half of the 15th century by German landsknechts. At some point, after a canonical visitation it was incorporated into the Bursfelde Congregation, a Benedictine reform from Germany. In 1521, Emperor Charles V and his brother Ferdinand visited the monastery and attended vespers, an event which is commemorated by a plaque.

In the 16th century the abbey was badly damaged by the Geuzes and most of the monks fled, leaving a community of four. It was rebuilt in the 17th century, but the constant wars and its location outside the walls of Bruges exposed it to further damage.

The abbey was suppressed and destroyed in 1796 during the French Revolution; only the 16th-century tower remained standing, and is now incorporated into the parish church built subsequently.

=== St. Andrew's Abbey, Zevenkerken ===
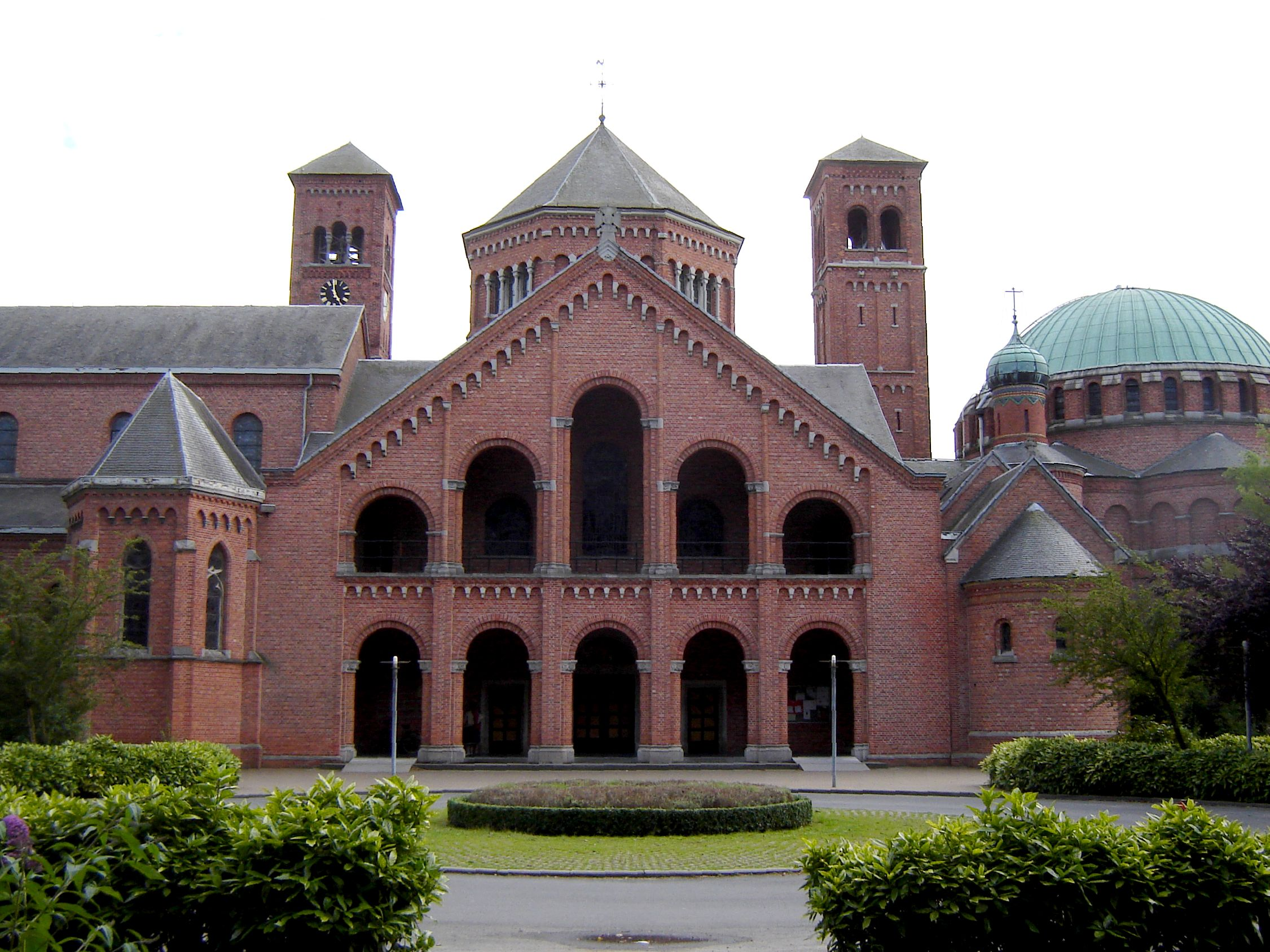
View of the abbey church ("Zevenkerken")

In 1898 Dom Gerard van Caloen, a monk from Maredsous Abbey founded a new monastic community close to the site of the previous one, for the specific intention of training missionaries. Léon Ockerhout, uncle of Dom Gérard, donated seven acres of the Beisbroek area for the construction of an abbey complex. The new monastery, St. Andrew's Abbey, Zevenkerken (Dutch: Sint-Andriesabdij van Zevenkerken), was built in 1899–1900, in Neo-Romanesque-Byzantine style. In 1901, St. Andrew's Abbey was incorporated into the Brazilian Congregation, but was detached from it in 1920 to form the Congregation of the Annunciation.

The abbey church contains seven chapels in various styles, one for each of the seven great basilicas of Rome, whence the name of the new foundation (which means "seven churches" in Dutch). A school was established here in 1910, the present Abdijschool van Zevenkerken ("Zevenkerken Abbey School"), a prestigious boarding school and part of St. Andrew's Abbey.

Gaspar Lefebvre made significant pastoral contributions to the liturgical movement by publishing from 1920 to 1959 bilingual missals from Latin into English, French, Dutch, and Italian. His work was widely used in English-speaking areas. From 1950 to 2006, the monks published the periodical "Heiliging".

In 1967 the abbey founded the Monastery Saint-Andrew of Clerlande.

== Overseas expansion ==
In 1929, monks of St. Andrew's Abbey founded St. Andrew's Priory in the Diocese of Shunqing, Sichuan, western China. Until 1953, the monks of the priory conducted missionary work among the local people. In 1953, the communists expelled all foreign priests as well as all male and female religious (monks, friars, nuns, sisters). Forced to leave China behind, in 1955 the monks purchased the Hidden Springs Ranch. St. Andrew's Priory thus began its ministry in Valyermo, California, which is located in the high desert of Southern California within the boundaries of the Archdiocese of Los Angeles.
