= Basilica and Monastery of St. Benedict, Olinda =

Basilica and Monastery of St. Benedict
- Basílica e Mosteiro de São Bento
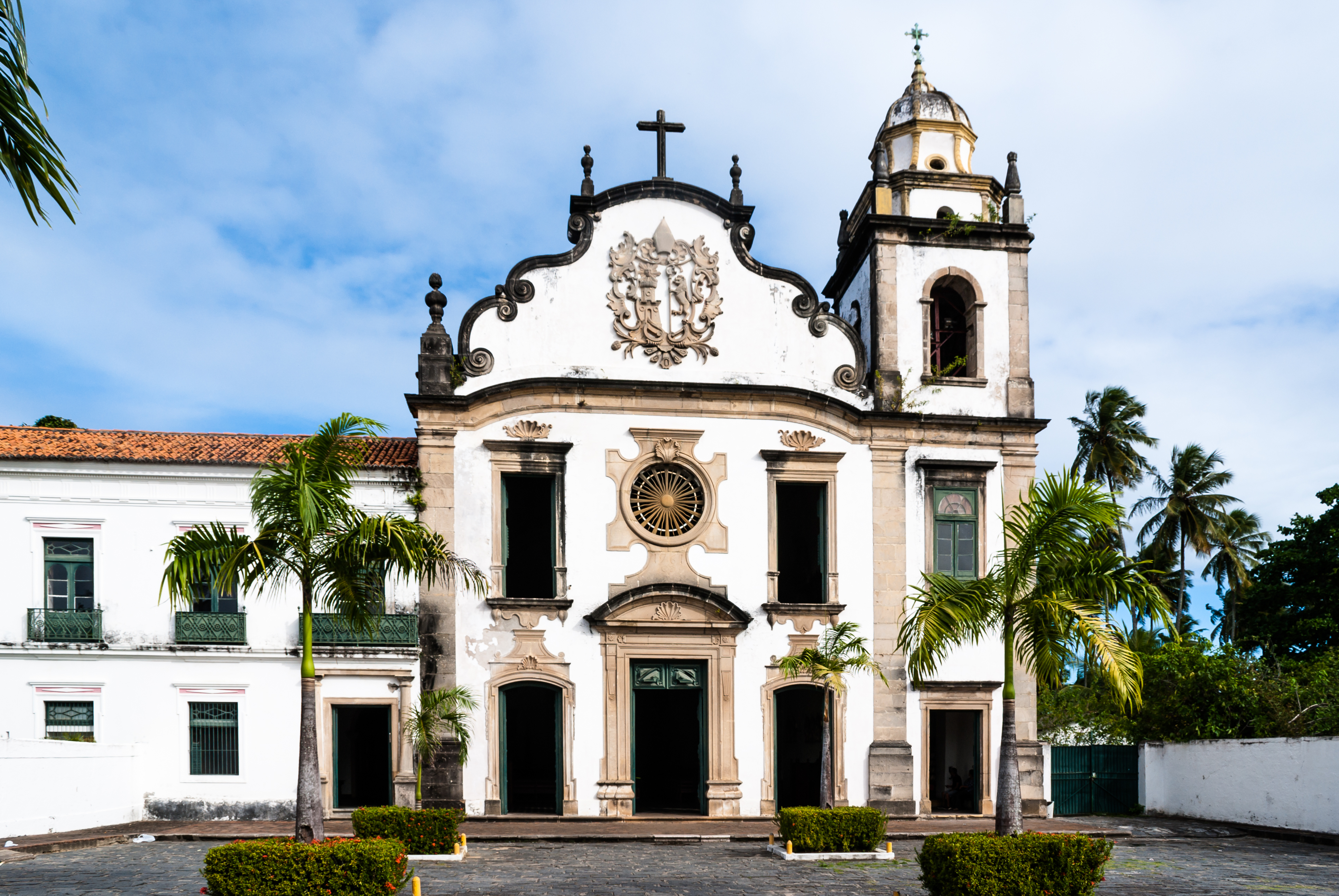

- Location of the Basilica and Monastery of St. Benedict in Brazil
- 8.019941°S 34.85205°W
- Location: Olinda
- Country: Brazil
- Denomination: Roman Catholic Church

Architecture
- Style: Baroque

National Historic Heritage of Brazil
- Designated: 1938
- Reference no.: 50

The Basilica and Monastery of St. Benedict (Portuguese: Basílica e Mosteiro de São Bento) Also Basilica of the Monastery of St. Benedict Is an important Catholic architectural complex built in Baroque style located in Olinda, Pernambuco, Brazil, which together with much of the historic center of the city, is a UNESCO World Heritage Site.

== History ==
The foundation of the Monastery of St. Benedict and its annexed church that goes back to the early days of Portuguese colonization in Brazil. The Order of St. Benedict went to Pernambuco at the request of the captain's grantee, Jorge de Albuquerque Coelho, to settle in the colony, offering them various benefits and advantages.

The construction of the present church of St. Benedict began in approximately 1660, after a fire that ravaged the city and old complex during the Dutch invasion, and finished in 1761, according to the inscription.

In 1998, the Church of the Monastery of St. Benedict was elevated to the rank of Minor Basilica by Pope John Paul II, through the apostolic letter "Spectabile quidem."

== See also ==
- Roman Catholicism in Brazil
- St. Benedict

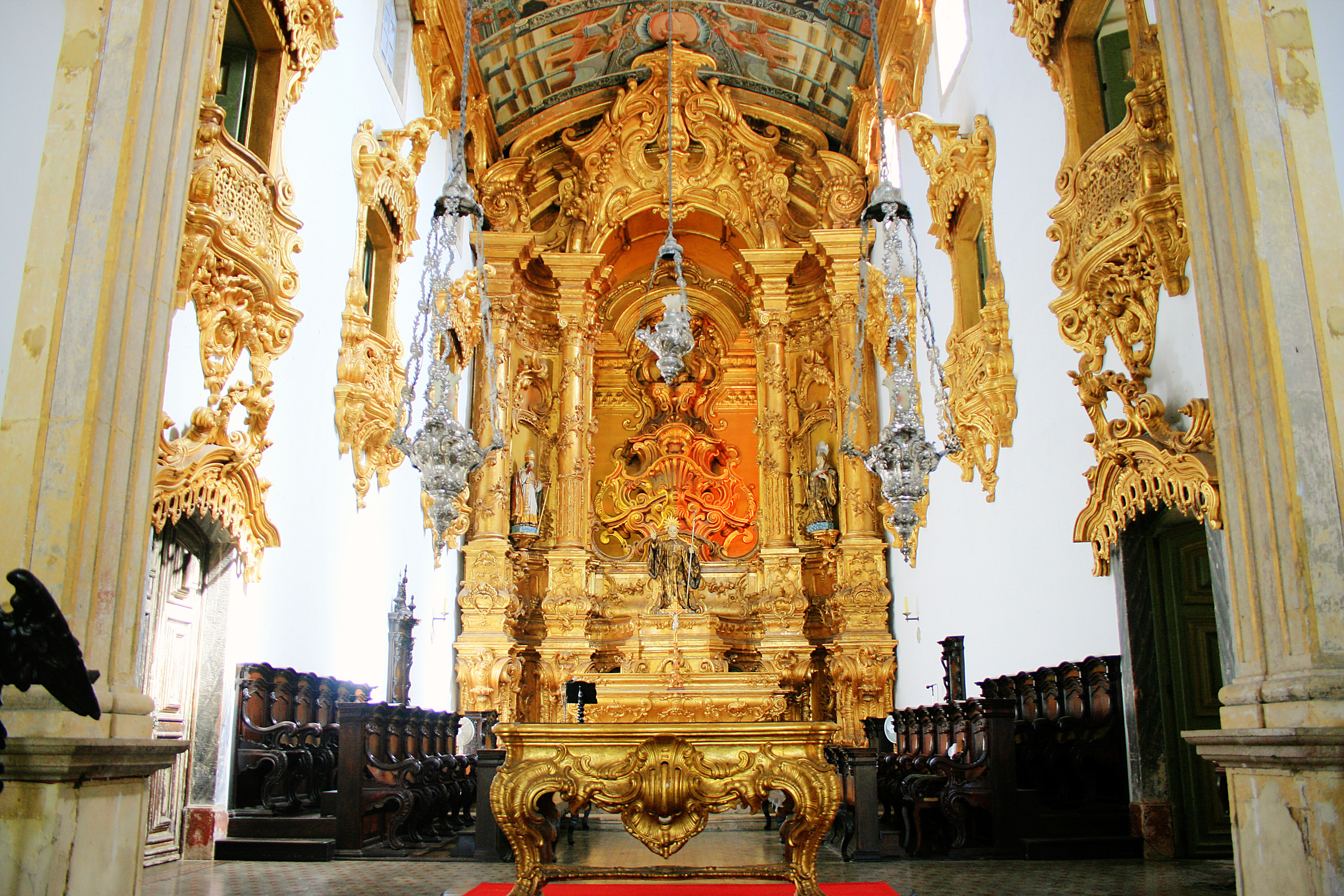
Internal view
