= Valyermo, California =

Unincorporated community in California, United States

- Unincorporated community
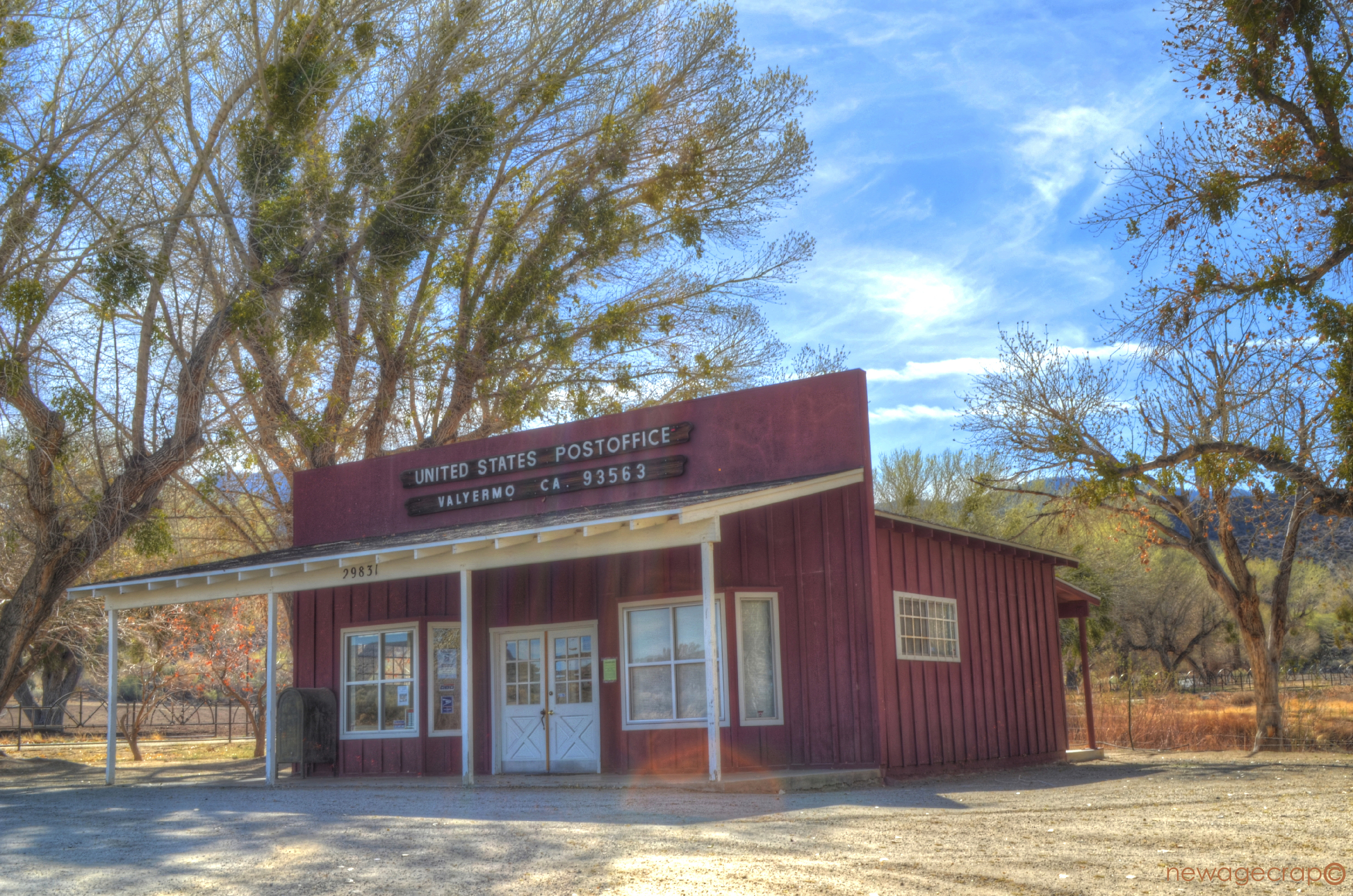
- Post Office in Valyermo

- Location within Los Angeles County

- Location in the United States
- Coordinates: 34°26′46″N 117°51′08″W
- Country: United States
- State: California
- County: Los Angeles
- Time zone: UTC-8 (Pacific (PST))
  - Summer (DST): UTC-7 (PDT)
- ZIP codes: 93563
- Area code: 661

Valyermo (Spanish: "Barren Valley") is an unincorporated community located in the Mojave Desert, in Los Angeles County, California, United States. The community has a population of approximately 450.

== Geography ==
Valyermo is located about 17 miles (27 km) southeast of Palmdale in the Antelope Valley portion of Southern California. The ZIP code for Valyermo is 93563 and the area code 661.

== Climate ==
Valyermo's location on the edge of the San Bernardino Mountains, near the desert, gives it a cold semi-arid climate instead of a cold desert climate, with roughly 10 inches of precipitation a year.

Climate data for Valyermo
Month	Jan	Feb	Mar	Apr	May	Jun	Jul	Aug	Sep	Oct	Nov	Dec	Year
Record high °F (°C)	82 (28)	81 (27)	89 (32)	94 (34)	102 (39)	108 (42)	110 (43)	110 (43)	110 (43)	100 (38)	87 (31)	81 (27)	110 (43)
Mean daily maximum °F (°C)	57.5 (14.2)	58.9 (14.9)	63.9 (17.7)	70.0 (21.1)	78.5 (25.8)	88.6 (31.4)	95.0 (35.0)	94.0 (34.4)	87.5 (30.8)	76.4 (24.7)	65.1 (18.4)	56.6 (13.7)	74.3 (23.5)
Daily mean °F (°C)	44.7 (7.1)	46.0 (7.8)	49.7 (9.8)	54.5 (12.5)	61.9 (16.6)	70.1 (21.2)	76.9 (24.9)	75.6 (24.2)	70.8 (21.6)	60.8 (16.0)	50.9 (10.5)	43.9 (6.6)	58.8 (14.9)
Mean daily minimum °F (°C)	31.9 (−0.1)	32.9 (0.5)	35.5 (1.9)	39.0 (3.9)	45.4 (7.4)	51.6 (10.9)	59.0 (15.0)	57.3 (14.1)	54.1 (12.3)	45.3 (7.4)	36.7 (2.6)	31.1 (−0.5)	43.3 (6.3)
Record low °F (°C)	1 (−17)	9 (−13)	12 (−11)	20 (−7)	20 (−7)	30 (−1)	31 (−1)	31 (−1)	29 (−2)	19 (−7)	8 (−13)	7 (−14)	1 (−17)
Average precipitation inches (mm)	1.75 (44)	2.03 (52)	1.57 (40)	0.66 (17)	0.25 (6.4)	0.04 (1.0)	0.19 (4.8)	0.28 (7.1)	0.33 (8.4)	0.36 (9.1)	0.91 (23)	1.73 (44)	10.1 (256.8)
Source: NOAA

== About Valyermo ==
"Valyermo" is a contraction of the Spanish words "valle yermo", or "barren valley".

St. Andrew's Abbey is a Roman Catholic monastery (Benedictine) located in the foothills of the Antelope Valley in Valyermo.
