= Collège Saint-Benoît de Maredsous =

Belgian secondary school

Coordinates: 50.3031°N 4.7660°E

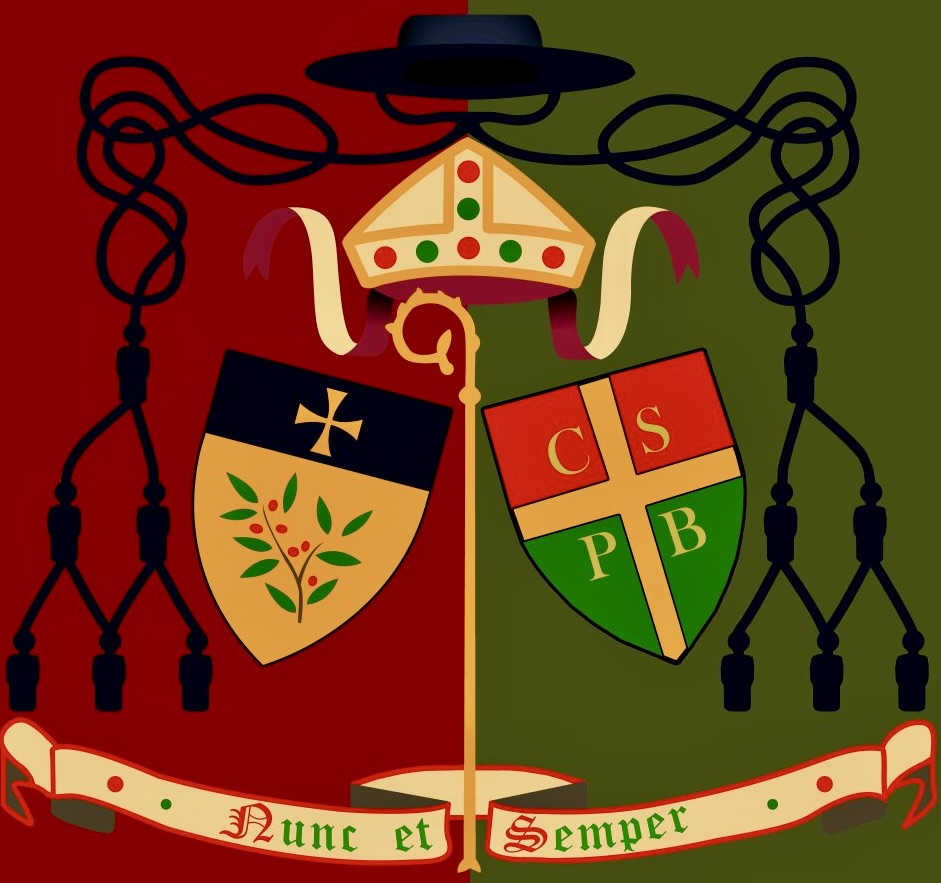
- Rue de Maredsous 12, 5537 Denée, Belgium

Information
- School type: Secondary school (grade 1 to 6) Catholic subsidised day-school and private boarding school.
- Motto: Nunc et Semper (Now and Always)
- Religious affiliation: Christian (Roman Catholic)
- Denomination: Benedictine
- Patron saint: Saint Benedict of Nursia
- Established: 1872 (abbey) 1883 (school)
- School code: Uniform mandatory during school hours
- President: Alumni President: Guillaume d'Udekem d'Acoz
- Director: Hélène De Pauw Willem
- Head of school: Père Abbé François Lear
- Enrollment: >250
- Campus type: Rural
- Colors: Red and Green
- Athletics: Rugby
- Nickname: Mareds
- Website: https://college.maredsous.be/

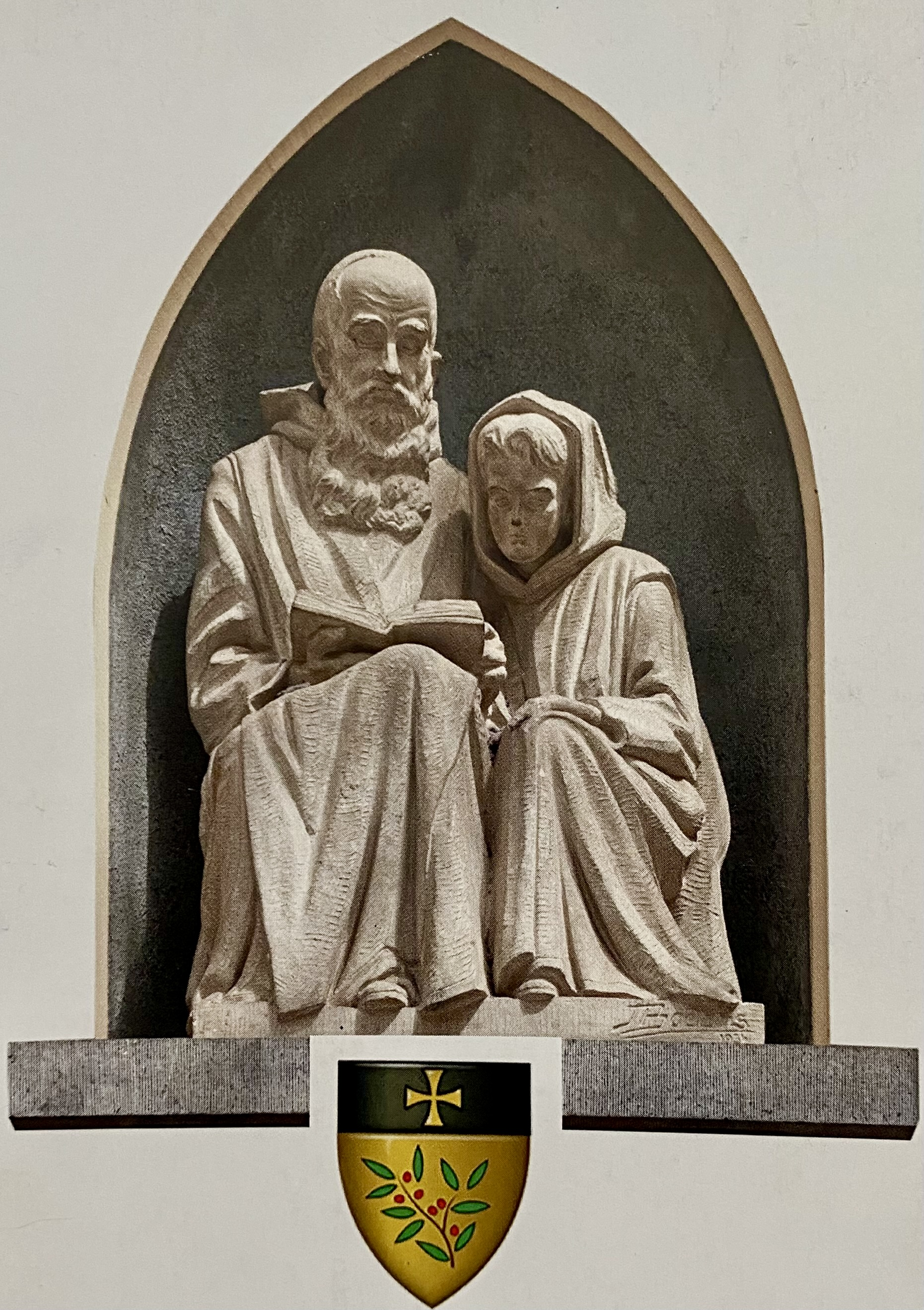
The symbolic statue you find in the indoor recess area, with the abbey's blazon.

The Collège Saint-Benoit de Maredsous, founded in 1881, is a prestigious Catholic secondary school in Denée, Belgium. The school is still affiliated to Maredsous abbey and its operation remains governed by the Benedictine philosophy of the founding fathers. It is also the birthplace of the Baden Powell Belgian Lonescouts, an elite troop unity within the Belgian Boy Scouts, founded in 1920 at the Maredsous Abbey by Father François Attout.

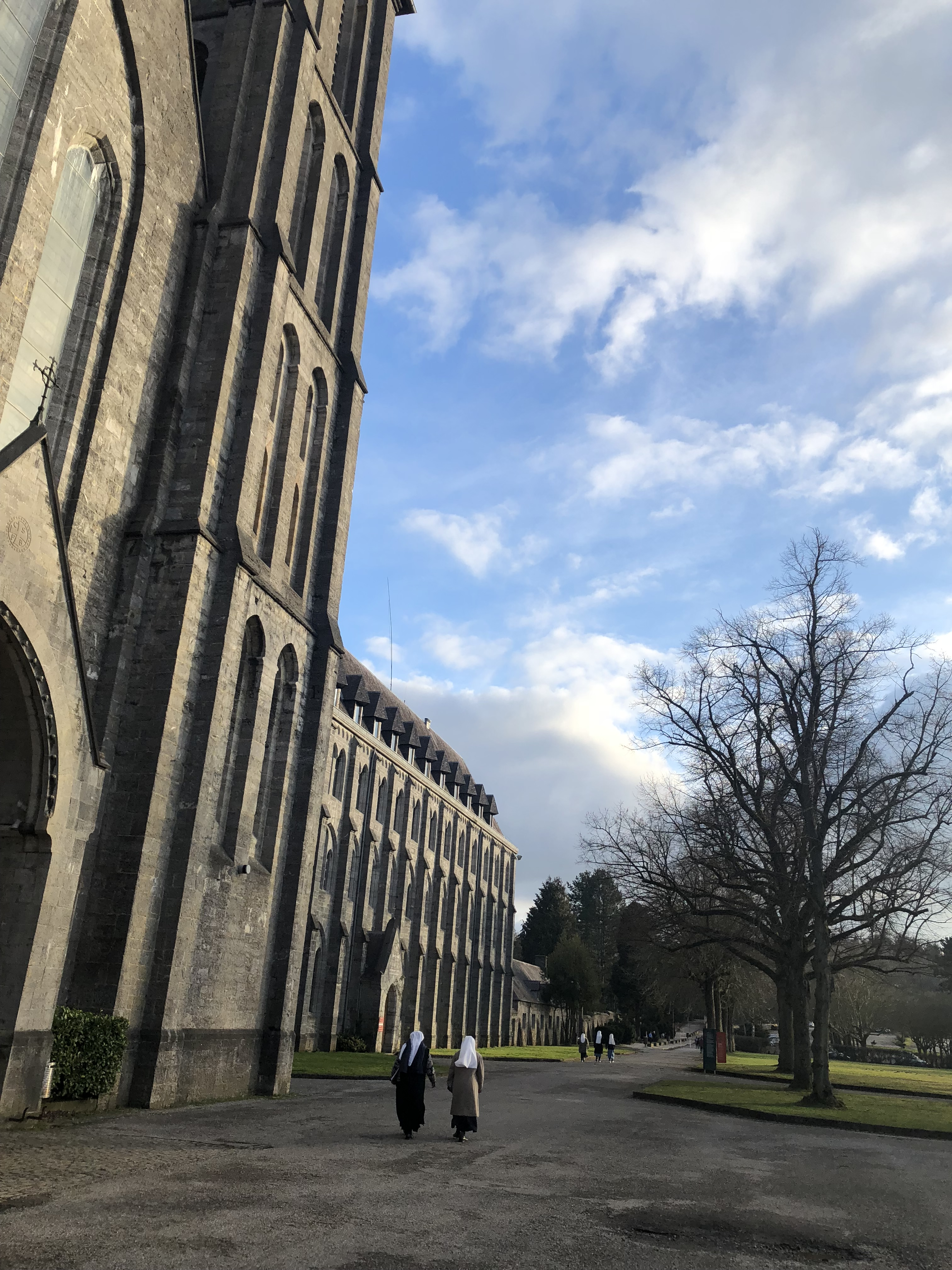
Picture taken from the college entrance; the nuns in the picture are the nuns of Maredret Abbey.

== History ==
Beuron Abbey in Germany, the founder of many religious houses, instigated the founding of Maredsous Abbey on 15 November 1872 at the suggestion of Belgian monk Hildebrand de Hemptinne, who later became the abbot of Maredsous. Moreover, Jean-Baptiste de Béthune (1831–1894), leader of the neo-gothic style in Belgium, is credited as the architect of the masterwork buildings.

The Desclée family financially supported the foundation, paying for the design and construction. The two brothers, who were printers of liturgical publications, were interested in restoring Christian art. Just like Hemptinne, Jules Desclée served in the Papal Zouaves. The brothers chose a scenic spot on Henri Desclée's estate in Namur Province to build a monastery where the monks of Beuron could reside.

In 1883, Maredsous Abbey established Saint-Benedict secondary school with the mission to provide quality education and teaching methods to young men based on the Benedictine tradition. The school has been devoted to the Gospel and the Rule of Saint Benedict ever since.

Originally, the school was intended for the nobility and reserved for men. Today, the school is coeducational and open to all while remaining a legacy school for many old Belgian families.

In 1996, the College opened its doors to girls for boarding and day school. However, the boys' boarding school remains its main component, comprising two-thirds of the population. Since September 1, 2008, a new boarding school has welcomed 49 girls aged 12 to 18 annually in a specially renovated neo-Gothic building near the Collège.
