= Collapse of the Imperial German Army =

The collapse of the Imperial German Army occurred in the latter half of 1918 and led to the German Revolution of 1918–1919, the Armistice and the eventual end of World War I following the signing of the Treaty of Versailles. Dissatisfaction, desertions, mass surrenders and mutinies had spread amongst the Imperial Germany Army following the defeat of the Spring Offensive. However it was only with the Kiel mutiny that a more determined initiative towards revolution emerged.

As the war drew on, the major belligerent countries all experienced increasing opposition to the war. In Russia, this culminated in the abdication of Nicholas II in the February Revolution, the French losses of the Nivelle Offensive led to numerous mutinies, and the British experienced problems with the Étaples mutiny.

However the German Supreme Army Command (OHL) fuelled the discontent in their army by conscripting workers who were already against the war. At the beginning of 1918 almost 1 million munition workers struck; one demand was peace without annexations. OHL ordered that "'all strikers fit to bear arms' be sent to the front". The German military archivist Erich Otto Volkmann estimated that in the spring of 1918 about 800,000 to 1,000,000 soldiers refused to follow the orders of their military superiors. The term "Drückeberger", or shirker, was the term used by the military authorities, a term which had already gained antisemitic connotations through its previous use in German military propaganda. The German historian Wilhelm Deist has argued that politically motivated militants had organised a verdeckter Militärstreik or hidden army strike.

Following the success of imposing the Treaty of Brest-Litovsk on the Bolshevik regime, General Erich Ludendorff launched the Spring Offensive of 1918 in an attempt to win the war on the Western Front before significant numbers of American troops could be involved. Despite initial successes, the offensive ground to a halt and soon the Allied Hundred Days Offensive was being organised. As American troops started to arrive at the front lines, German morale plummeted and dissatisfied soldiers increasingly disregarded their officers. In the Battle of Amiens, a large number of German soldiers surrendered, leading Ludendorff to call the first day of the battle the "black day of the German Army". Ludendorff noted instances of retreating troops shouting "You're prolonging the war!" at officers who tried to rally them and "Blackleg!" at reserve troops who moved up to the front lines.

== See also ==
- Brussels Soldiers' Council
