= Loppem Coup =

1918 political meetings in Belgium

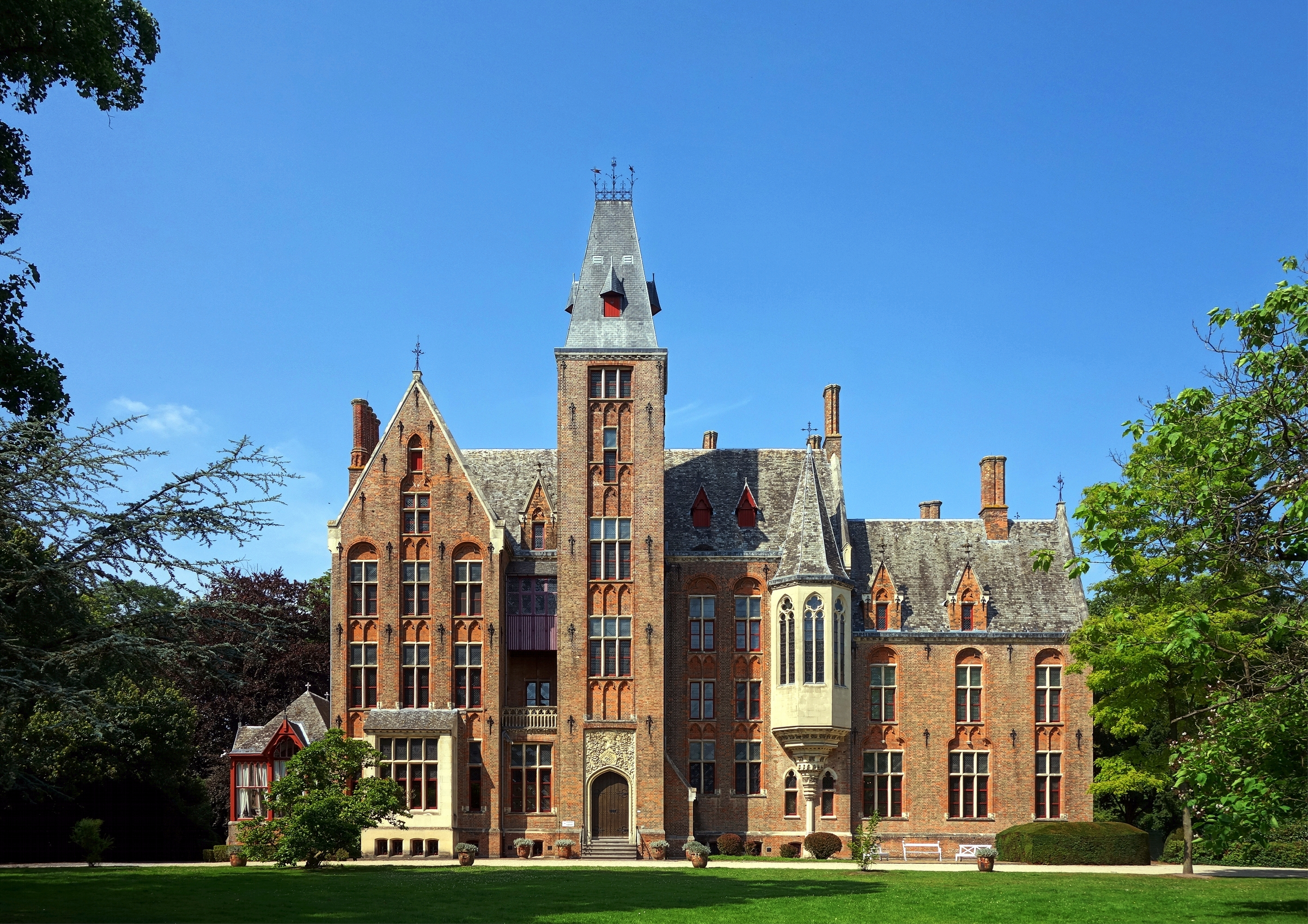
Modern-day view of the Castle of Loppem, then serving as the military headquarters of King Albert I, in which the meetings were held.

The Loppem Coup (French: Coup de Lophem, Dutch: Coup van Loppem) or Loppem Agreement (Pacte de Lophem, Akkoord van Loppem) refers to a series of meetings held privately by King Albert I at the Castle of Loppem in Loppem (Lophem), West Flanders on 11 to 14 November 1918 about the future political order in Belgium after the end of World War I. The term "coup" originated among conservative Catholic critics in the 1930s who denounced the King's actions as an unconstitutional coup d'état.

Convened in the aftermath of the Armistice of 11 November 1918 in the days before the King's triumphant return to Brussels which had been occupied since 1914, the Loppem meetings consisted of a series of private audiences with prominent socialist and liberal politicians and notables such as Edward Anseele, Paul-Émile Janson, and Émile Francqui who had become prominent in German-occupied Belgium. A number of sensitive political topics were discussed, including universal male suffrage, labour rights, and the status of Dutch language, notably in higher education.

The meetings preceded the creation of a national unity government under Léon Delacroix on 21 November, sometimes referred to as the "Loppem Government" (gouvernement de Lophem/regering van Loppem). Although led by a Catholic prime minister, the new government also included liberals and socialists and marked the end of nearly four decades of exclusive Catholic political dominance in Belgian politics. On 22 November, King Albert I re-entered Brussels at the head of the Belgian Army in a Joyous Entry. He announced a new legislative programme to include the abolition of the pre-war electoral system of plural voting and the creation of a new university taught exclusively in Dutch.

The political innovations in November 1918 shocked conservative Catholics who ultimately succeeded in delaying some of the new measures. On learning of the Loppem discussions, some radical conservatives denounced them as a "coup" in which the monarch, either at his own initiative or under socialist pressure amid the November Revolution in Germany, had overstepped his constitutional prerogatives to favour the political left. King Albert I was forced to issue a public letter on 10 February 1930 clarifying his account of the discussions.

== See also ==
- Red Week (Netherlands), socialist unrest in 9–14 November 1918
- Luxembourg rebellions
- Brussels Soldiers' Council
