= Hertog Jan (restaurant) =

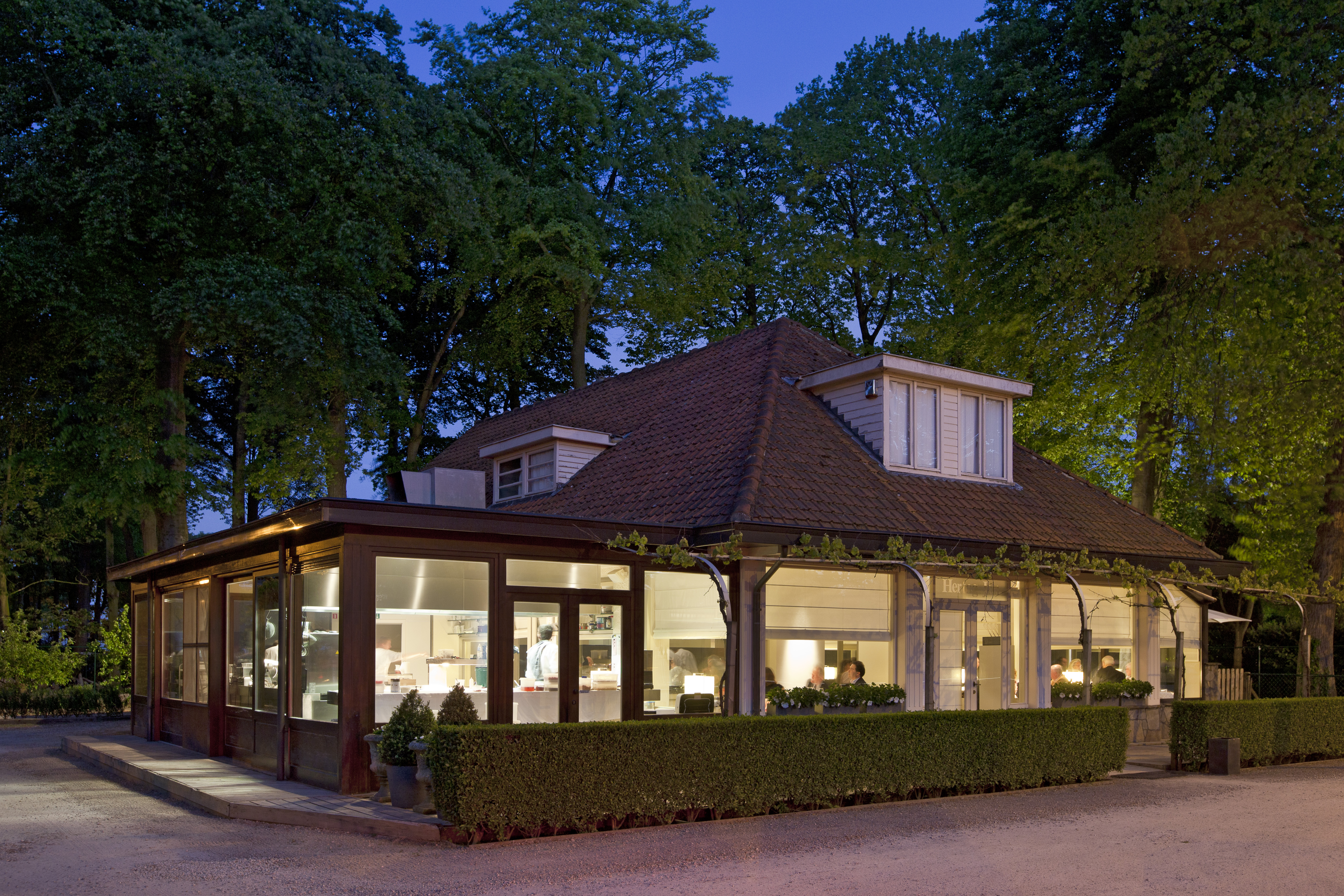
- Original Hertog Jan restaurant, in Bruges
- Interactive map of Hertog Jan

Restaurant information
- Chef: Gert De Mangeleer
- Food type: Creative, Asian
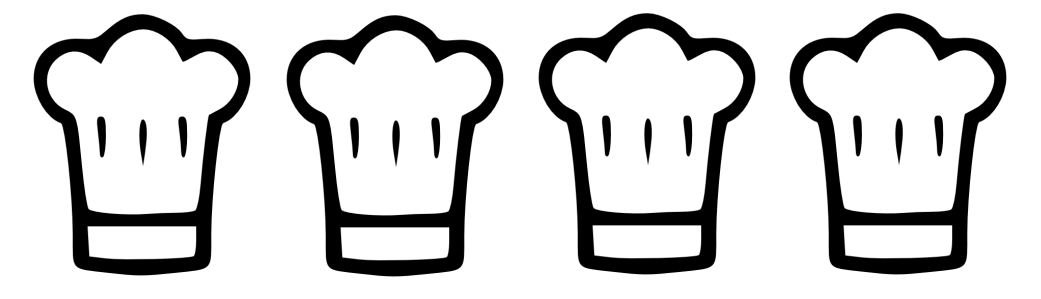
- Rating: (Michelin Guide) (Gault Millau)
- Location: Leopoldstraat 26, Antwerpen, Belgium
- Coordinates: 51°12′52.4″N 4°24′19.8″E
- Website: hertog-jan.com

Hertog Jan was a restaurant in Bruges and (from July 2014) Loppem–Zedelgem, Belgium. It was led by chefs Gert De Mangeleer and Joachim Boudens.

It was rated with 3 stars by the Michelin Red Guide, one of only three restaurants in the country as of 2012.

On 22 December 2018, Hertog Jan was closed to open a brasserie in Antwerp. The new restaurant has received 2 Michelin stars and an 18/20 rating (4 toques) from Gault Millau

== See also ==
- List of Michelin three starred restaurants
