= Sint-Denijs-Westrem =

Sub-municipality of the city of Ghent, Belgium

- Sub-municipality of Ghent
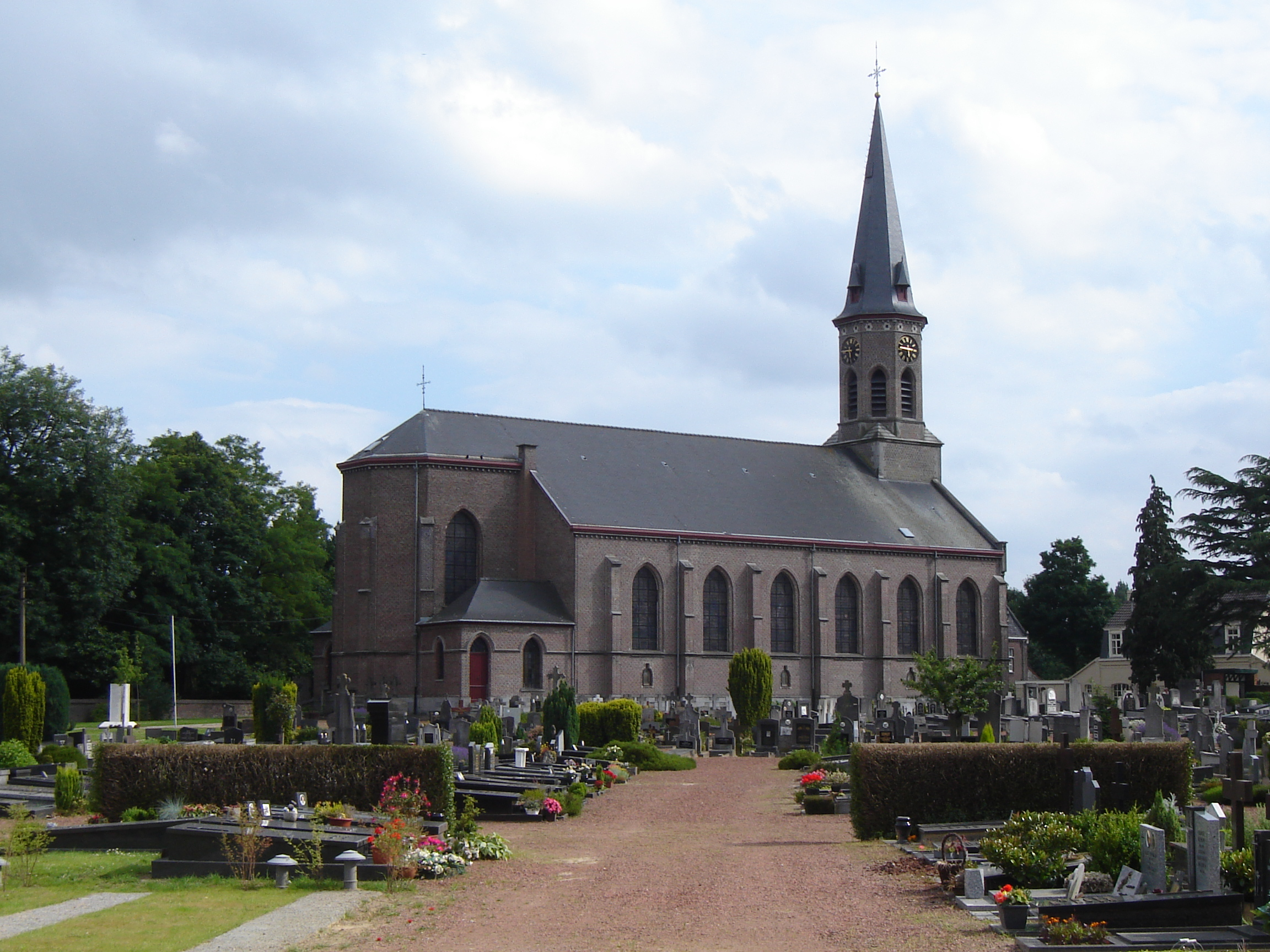
- St Denis Church

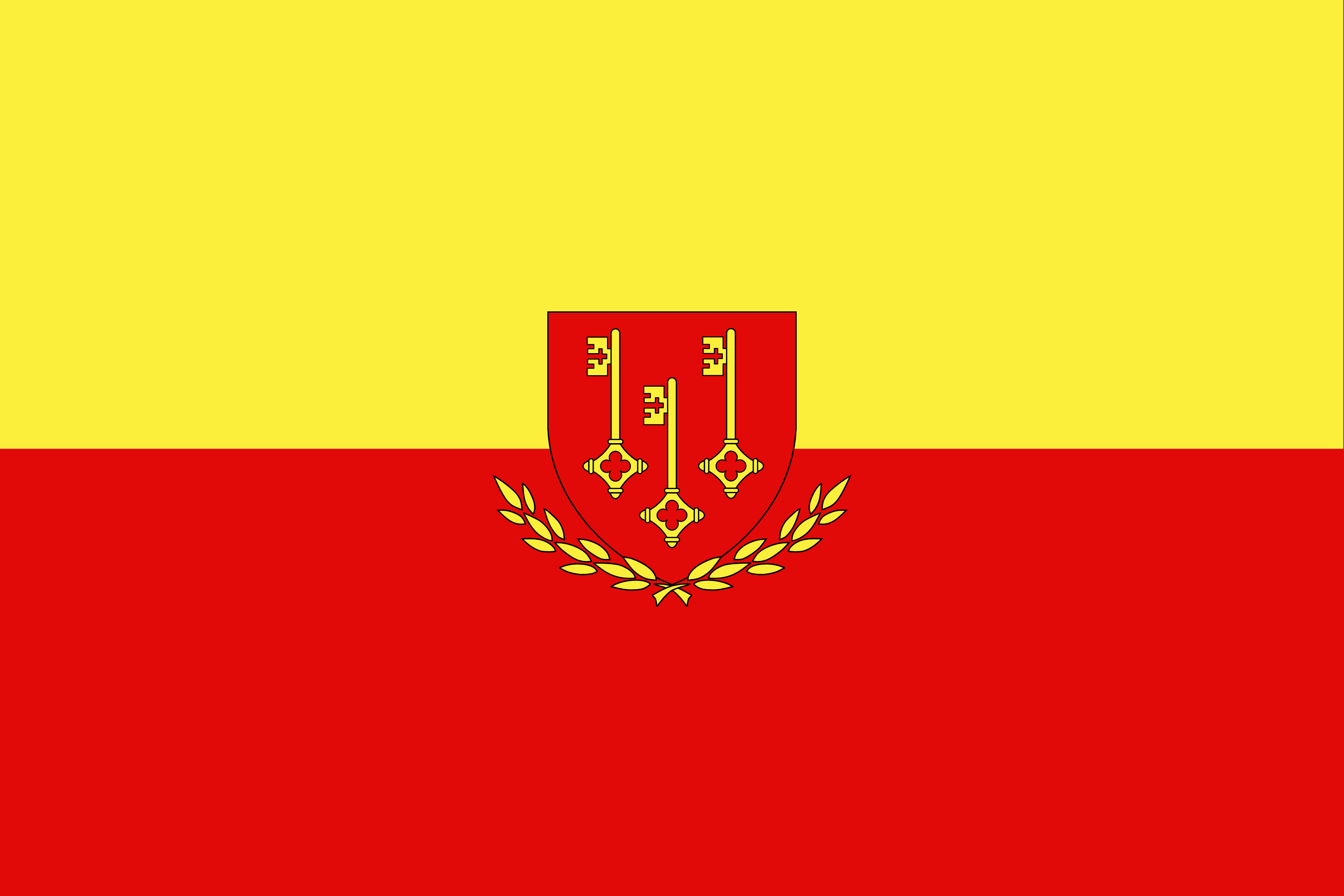
- Flag Coat of arms
- Interactive map of Sint-Denijs-Westrem
- Location within Belgium Location within East Flanders
- Coordinates: 51°01′17″N 3°40′08″E
- Country: Belgium
- Community: Flemish Community
- Region: Flemish Region
- Province: East Flanders
- Arrondissement: Ghent
- Municipality: Ghent

Area
  - Total: 6.24 km^{2} (2.41 sq mi)

Population (2020-01-01)
  - Total: 5,545
  - Density: 889/km^{2} (2,300/sq mi)
- Postal codes: 9051
- Area codes: 09

Sint-Denijs-Westrem (Dutch: [ˌsɪn dəˈnɛis ˈʋɛstrəm]; French: Saint-Denis-Westrem) is a sub-municipality of the city of Ghent located in the province of East Flanders, Flemish Region, Belgium. It was a separate municipality until 1 January 1977, when it was merged into Ghent.

== History ==
Sint-Denijs-Westrem lies on the Roman road between Kortrijk and Ghent. Archeological digs on the Flanders Expo site have shown significant signs of settlement from prehistory through the Middle Ages.

During the late Middle Ages the castles of Idewalle, Borluut, Darupt, Hof ten Broecke, Maaltekasteel were built in and around the Sint-Denijs-Westrem area.

In 1858, architect, artisan and designer Jean-Baptiste Bethune moved his studio from Bruges to Sint-Denijs-Westrem.

The town square ("Gemeenteplein") was built between 1895 and 1899.

Until the 20th century the area was mainly agrarian and sparsely populated; from the second half of the 20th century on the village has been steadily more densely built up, with many castle grounds subdivided for housing development.
