= Revue Bénédictine =

- Discipline: Church history, church writing
- Language: English, French, German, Italian

Publication details
- Former name(s): Le Messager des fidèles
- History: 1884-present
- Publisher: Brepols on behalf of the Maredsous Abbey (Belgium)
- Frequency: Biannually

Standard abbreviations
- ISO 4: Rev. Bénédict.

Indexing
- ISSN: 0035-0893 (print); 2295-9009 (web)
- LCCN: 06036059
- OCLC no.: 609869952

Links
- Journal homepage; Journal page at publisher's website; Online access

The Revue Bénédictine is a biannual peer-reviewed academic journal published since 1884 from Maredsous Abbey by the Order of Saint Benedict and Belgian publishing house Brepols. The journal covers church history and church writing (in English, French, Italian, and German) as well as primary texts. The first six volumes were published under the title Le Messager des fidèles (1884–1889). The journal is abstracted and indexed in Scopus.
