= Luxembourg rebellions =

1918–19 attempted rebellions against Luxembourg monarchy

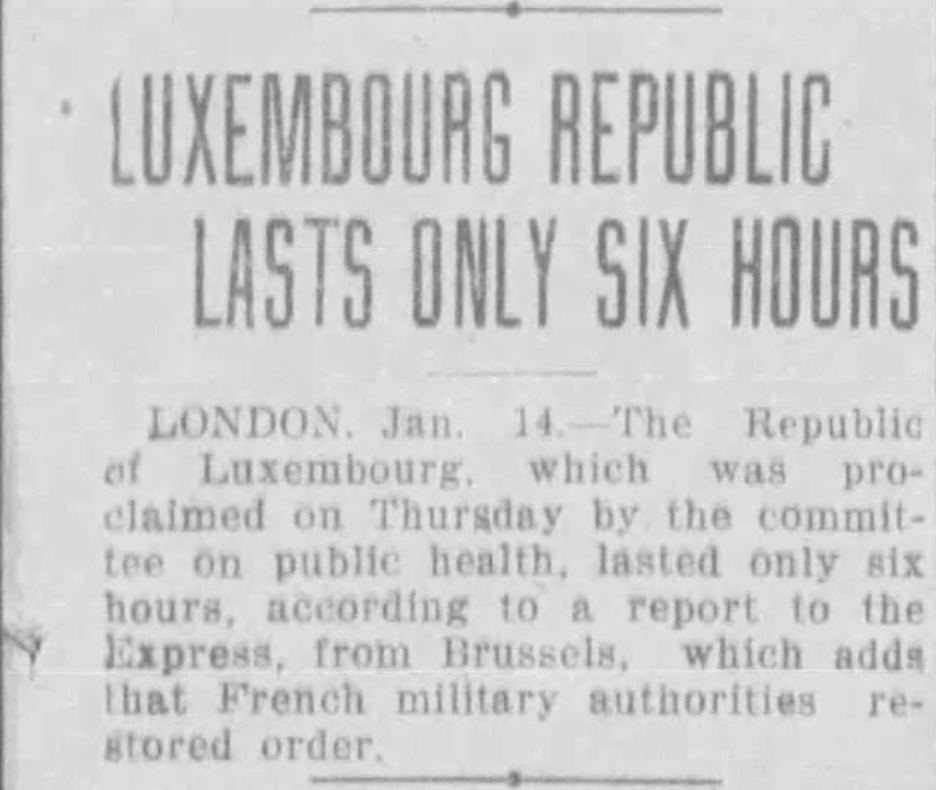
News report from the Buffalo News on the 1919 Luxembourg rebellion

The Luxembourg rebellions were a series of riots and mutinies in Luxembourg from 1918–1919, inspired by the German revolution of 1918–1919. The rebellions failed, mainly due to the lack of public support as well as France intervening in support of the government.

== World War I ==
Luxembourg was occupied during World War I. From August 1914 until the end of World War I on 11 November 1918, the Grand Duchy of Luxembourg was under full occupation by the German Empire. The German government justified the occupation by citing the need to support their armies in neighbouring France, although many Luxembourgers, contemporary and present, have interpreted German actions otherwise.

During this period, Luxembourg was allowed to retain its own government and political system, but all proceedings were overshadowed by the German army's presence. Grand Duchess Marie Adelaide stayed in power but due to her German-leaning attitude, lost the support of part of the population and the Allies.

== November 1918 ==
Luxembourg faced two small communist rebellions in Luxembourg City (10 November) and Esch-sur-Alzette (11 November). Both were quickly suppressed by police. Socialists and liberals in the Chamber of Deputies called for the abdication of Grand Duchess Marie Adelaide, which was narrowly defeated.

== December 1918 ==
In December 1918, a significant escalation occurred in the ongoing tensions within the Luxembourgish military forces. A group of soldiers, part of the volunteer army of the Grand Duchy of Luxembourg, initiated a mutiny in the Luxembourg City barracks. This action stemmed from several grievances that had been brewing over time.

According to a report from Evening Express, the soldiers decided by a large majority to send a list of 31 demands to the Chamber of Deputies. These demands aimed at profound military reforms, including the abolition of the Prussian military command system, the introduction of a system with French command influences, enhanced facilities for promotion within the ranks, and a significant reduction in the number of lieutenants. The government, however, refused to engage with the volunteer delegates, prompting the soldiers to return to their barracks and fortify their position. They formed an emergency commission to handle negotiations with the authorities, declaring a steadfast refusal to deal under the old leadership paradigms. The standoff marked a critical point in Luxembourg's military history, as all the proposals for settlement offered by the soldiers were ultimately rejected.

== January 1919 ==
During January 1919 major discontent was growing in Luxembourg against the government. On 9 January 1919, the same group of socialist and liberal deputies active in November, tabled a motion to make Luxembourg a republic. The motion passed and the Socialist leader, M. Mark, proclaimed a Republic, declaring that the deputies who were staying out of the sitting were going to elect a Committee of Public Safety. A crowd gathered at the barracks of the Corps of Volunteers, close to the Chamber. Then Émile Servais, a left-wing politician, walked out, addressed the crowd and demanded a republic. This announcement was greeted with cheers and the singing of Marseillaise. The crowd then rushed the Chamber and the deputies called in the Corps of Volunteers to clear the area. The soldiers refused to obey their orders.

Part of the deputies then fled the Chamber. The remaining deputies, mainly left-wing, formed the Committee of Public Safety with Servais as its leader. The seven members of the Committee of Public Safety were Émile Servais, Pescator, Brasseur, Trolst, Mark, Ikausen, and Diedrich. The committee had no public support and the French Army under the command of General de La Tour soon quelled the turmoil.

== Aftermath ==
It was clear that the position of Grand Duchess Marie-Adélaïde was untenable and she stepped down as Grand Duchess on 14 January 1919 and went into exile. She was replaced with her younger sister, Charlotte.

Charlotte's accession to the throne led to a stabilization of the political situation in Luxembourg. In addition in September Luxembourg then had the 1919 Luxembourg referendum in which the public overwhelmingly voted to keep the monarchy.

== See also ==
- Loppem Coup
- Brussels Soldiers' Council
- Red Week (Netherlands)
