= Loppem Castle =

- Kasteel van Loppem
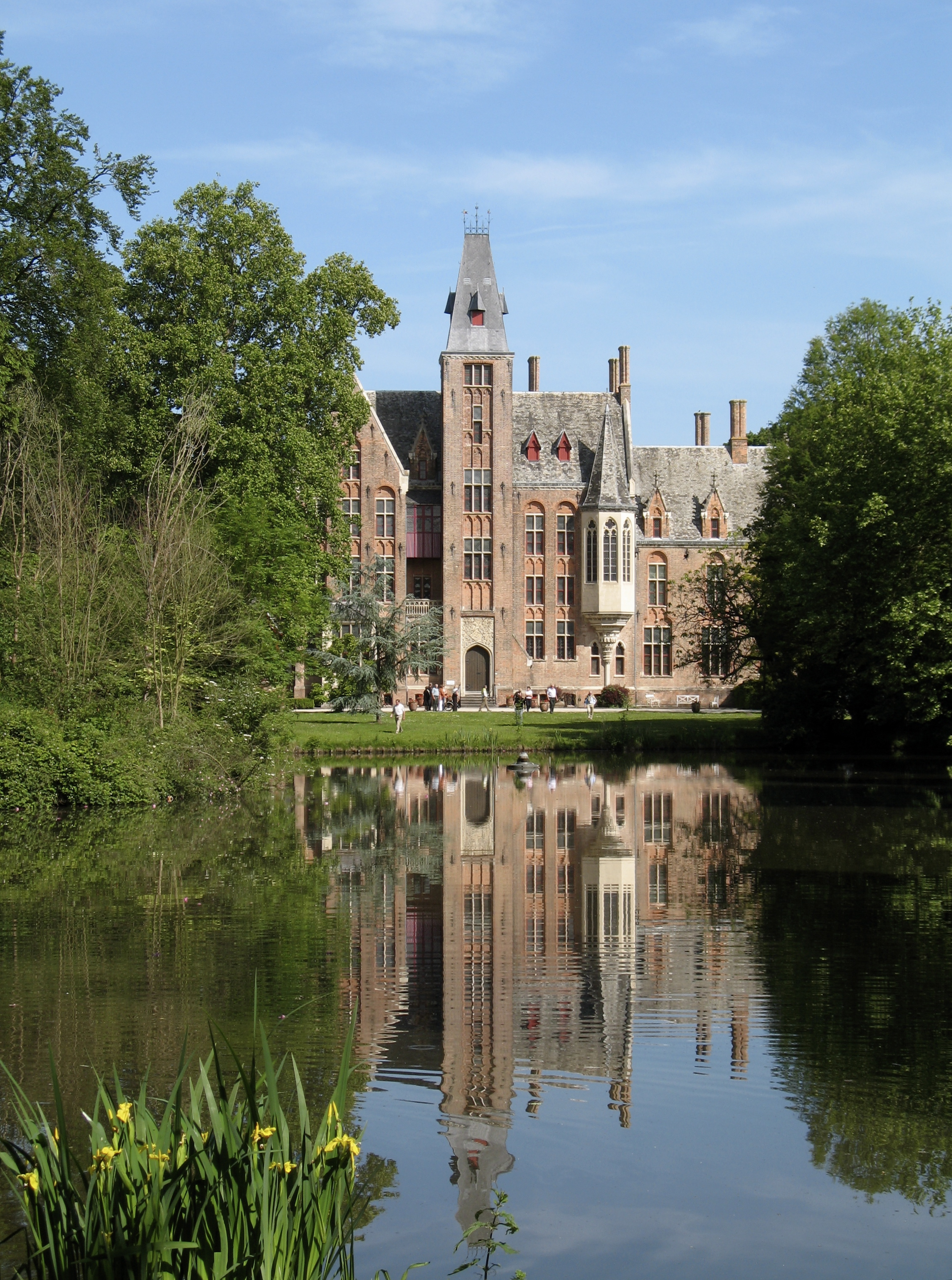

- Location within Belgium
- Alternative names: Kasteel van Caloen

General information
- Status: Museum (since 1975)
- Type: Mansion
- Architectural style: Gothic Revival
- Classification: Protected monument (since 1985); built heritage (since 2011)
- Location: Zedelgem, West Flanders, Belgium
- Coordinates: 51.156°N 3.203°E
- Construction started: 1858
- Completed: 2 July 1863
- Client: Charles van Caloen
- Owner: Jean van Caloen Foundation

Design and construction
- Architects: E.W. Pugin and Jean-Baptiste de Béthune

Website
- Loppem Castle official website

Loppem Castle (Dutch: Kasteel van Loppem) is a mansion situated in Loppem in the municipality of Zedelgem, near Bruges in West Flanders, in the Flemish Region of Belgium.

Unusually, it preserves its original architecture and interior decoration. The castle has a richly decorated and furnished interior, and houses a collection of works of art (paintings, stained glass, statuary). It is surrounded by a romantic park with ponds and a maze, which has itself been designated a protected heritage landscape.

The castle and park are now owned by the Stichting Jean van Caloen ("Jean van Caloen Foundation") and have been open to the public since 1975.

== History ==
The castle was built between 1859 and 1862 for Baron Charles van Caloen and his family, to designs by architects E.W. Pugin and Jean-Baptiste Bethune. It is considered a masterpiece of Gothic Revival architecture.

In late 1917, during the German Occupation, the castle was requisitioned for the use of a German general and his staff. After the German withdrawal, the castle served as the residence of Albert I of Belgium from 24 October until 25 November 1918. It was the site of a number of political meetings held by the King which became known as the Loppem Agreements.

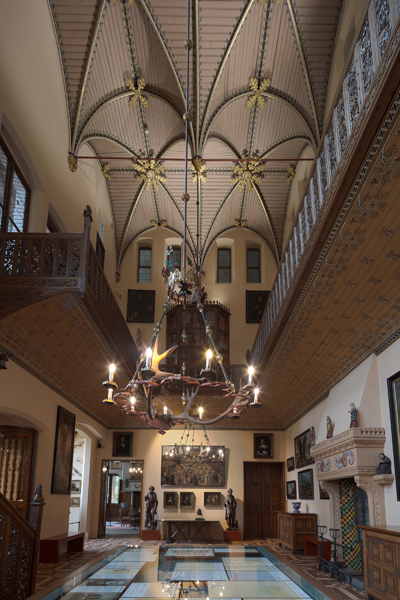
Entrance hall

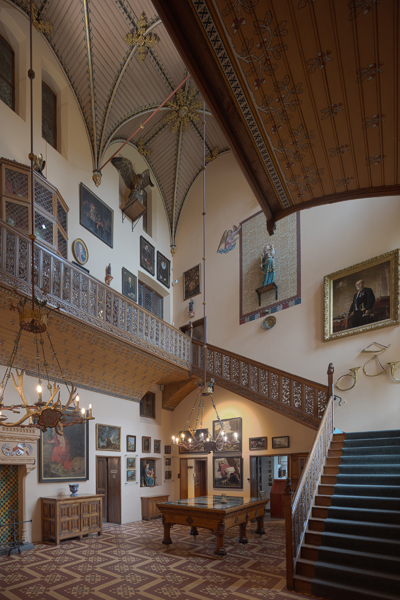
Stairs

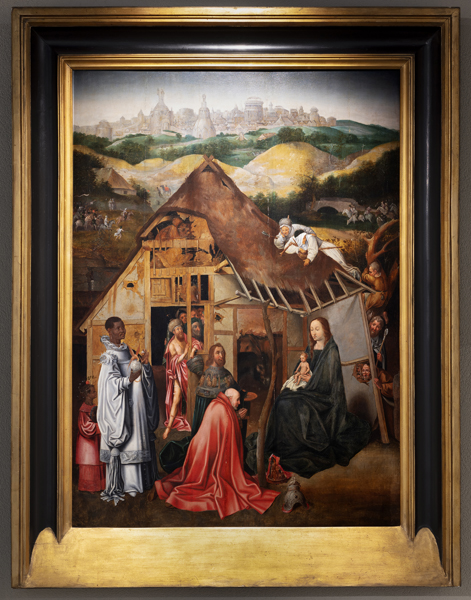
Adoration of the Magi (16th c.)

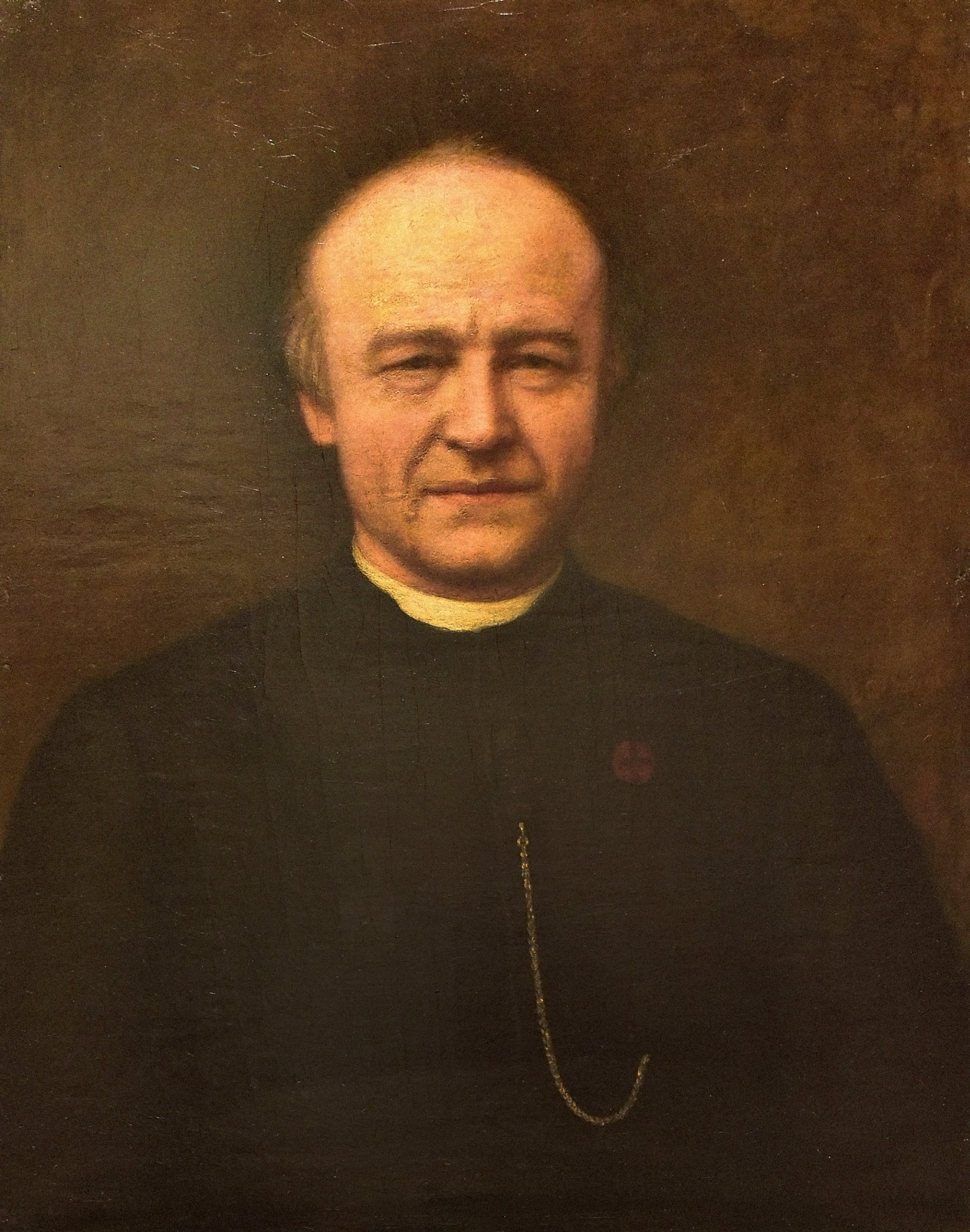
Guido Gezelle by Gustave Léonard de Jonghe

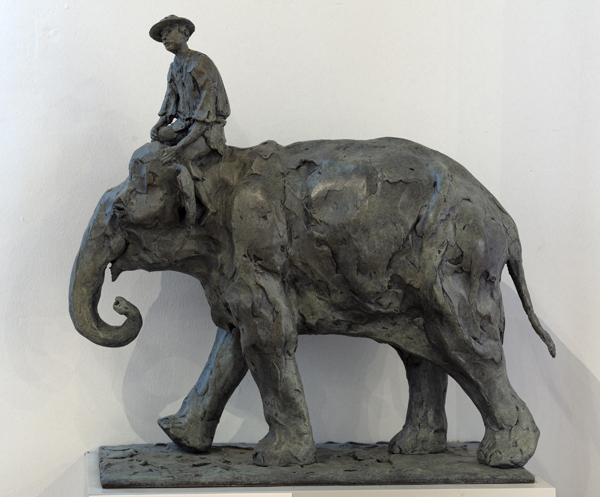
Elephant by Cécile Kruyfhooft

== See also ==
- List of castles in Belgium
