= Henri and Jules Desclée =

Belgian brothers and publishers

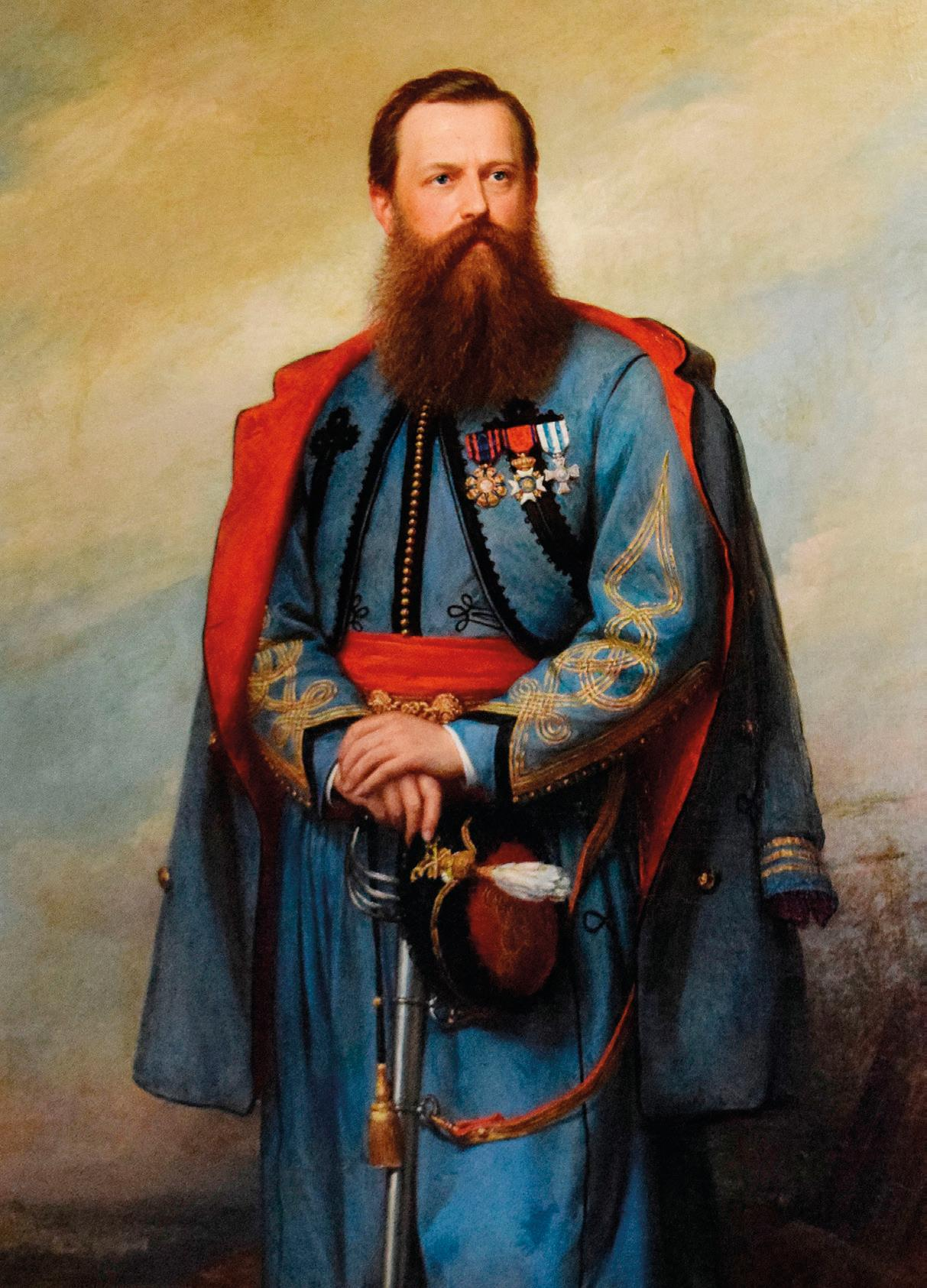
Jules Desclée's portrait as a Papal Zouave, circa 1865.

Henri Desclée (1830–1917) and Jules Desclée (July 9, 1828-August 2, 1911) were Belgian brothers, known as founders of Maredsous Abbey, and of two printing business for Roman Catholic literature, the Société Saint-Jean l'Évangéliste and Desclée De Brouwer.

== Background ==
Brothers François (1800-1842) and Henri Philippe (1802-1873) Desclée were lawyers and entrepreneurs, who brought gas-powered lighting to Bruges to replace oil lamps and lanterns. François died in 1842. Having reached an agreement with the city council for the development of a gas-powered city lighting network, in 1848 Henri Philippe built a large gas plant.factory along the Scheepsdalelaan.

"Desclée & Compagnie" had three shareholders: manager Henri Philippe, the widow of François Desclée and Jean-Baptiste de Brouwer, the owner of a tannery and a school friend of Henri Philippe. His sons each married a daughter of Jean-Baptiste. After Henri Philippe's death in 1873, the gas company was taken over by his sons Henri (1830-1917) and Jules (1833-1911). The company remained in the hands of the descendants of Desclée and de Brouwer for many years until merged with the nv. Ebes in 1958.

== Publishing ==
With the develop of electric lighting, the Desclées diversified into publishing. The Société Saint-Jean l'Évangéliste was founded in Tournai in 1872 by Henri-Philippe Desclée and his two sons Henri (1830-1917) and Jules (1833-1911), the object being to restore Christian art in liturgical publications. The brothers then founded in 1877 with their brother-in-law, Alphonse de Brouwer, a printing shop in Bruges, to which they attached in 1883, a bookshop and publishing house known as Desclée de Brouwer, or "the Saint-Augustin Society". A few years later, a branch was opened in Paris.

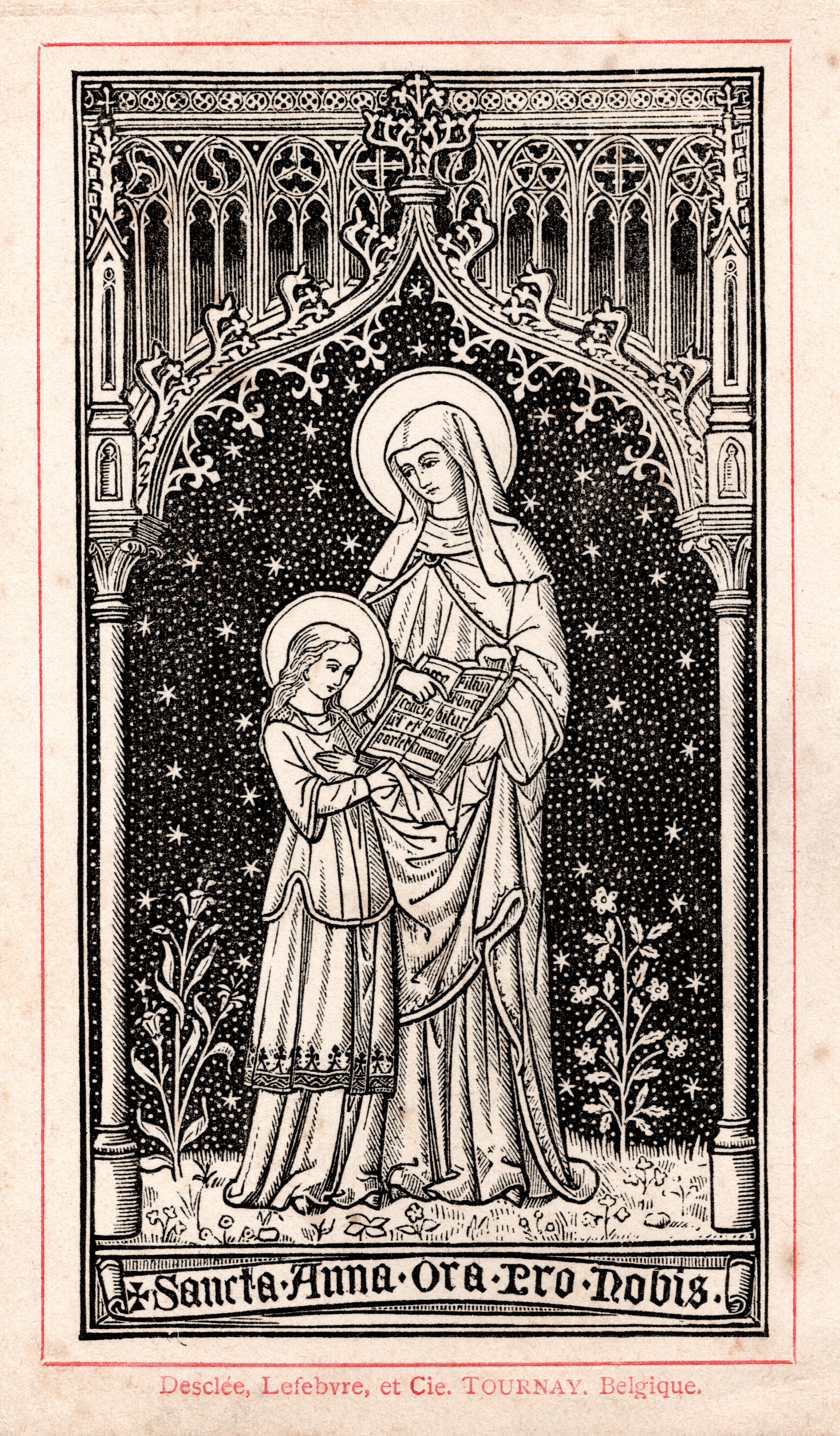
Illustration of St. Anne and the Blessed Virgin Mary, created by Jean-Baptiste Bethune for the Society of St. John the Evangelist.

The aesthetic principles by which their enterprise was to be directed were those of the Middle Ages. Through marketing publications and lithographs inspired in style by medieval manuscripts, the founders aimed to contribute to reviving the Christian spirit of the time. Here they were assisted by Baron Jean-Baptiste Bethune, promoter of the Gothic Revival in Belgium. Bethune not only designed lithographs, typefaces and bindings for Desclée De Brouwer, but also checked and corrected their execution. William Henry James Weale, also a staunch proponent of the Gothic Revival, was for a time a representative for the company's publications in London.

At first the society relied on English workmen, compositors, and printers. The first publications attracted the attention of connoisseurs. The Society, following first the work of Joseph Pothier, and afterwards the studies of the Benedictines of Solesmes, issued the first publications for the re-establishment of the liturgical chant, commonly called "plain chant". These editions served as a basis for the edition brought out by the Vatican printing press, and imposed by Pope Pius X on the Catholic Church.

Desclée de Brouwer mainly publishes works of religious and philosophical content, as well as religious works, including missals, catechisms, and school books. It also published a variety of books relating to ecclesiastical studies, ascetic theology, religious history and literature, hagiography, art, archaeology, education, etc. The production of religious images formed also an important part of the work of the Society, at Bruges in Belgium, and at Lille in France. In 1881 the Desclée brothers took over the production of the Revue de l'art chrétien. In 2006, after some financial vicissitudes, Éditions Desclée de Brouwer was bought by the Swiss group Parole et silence.

== Maredsous Abbey ==
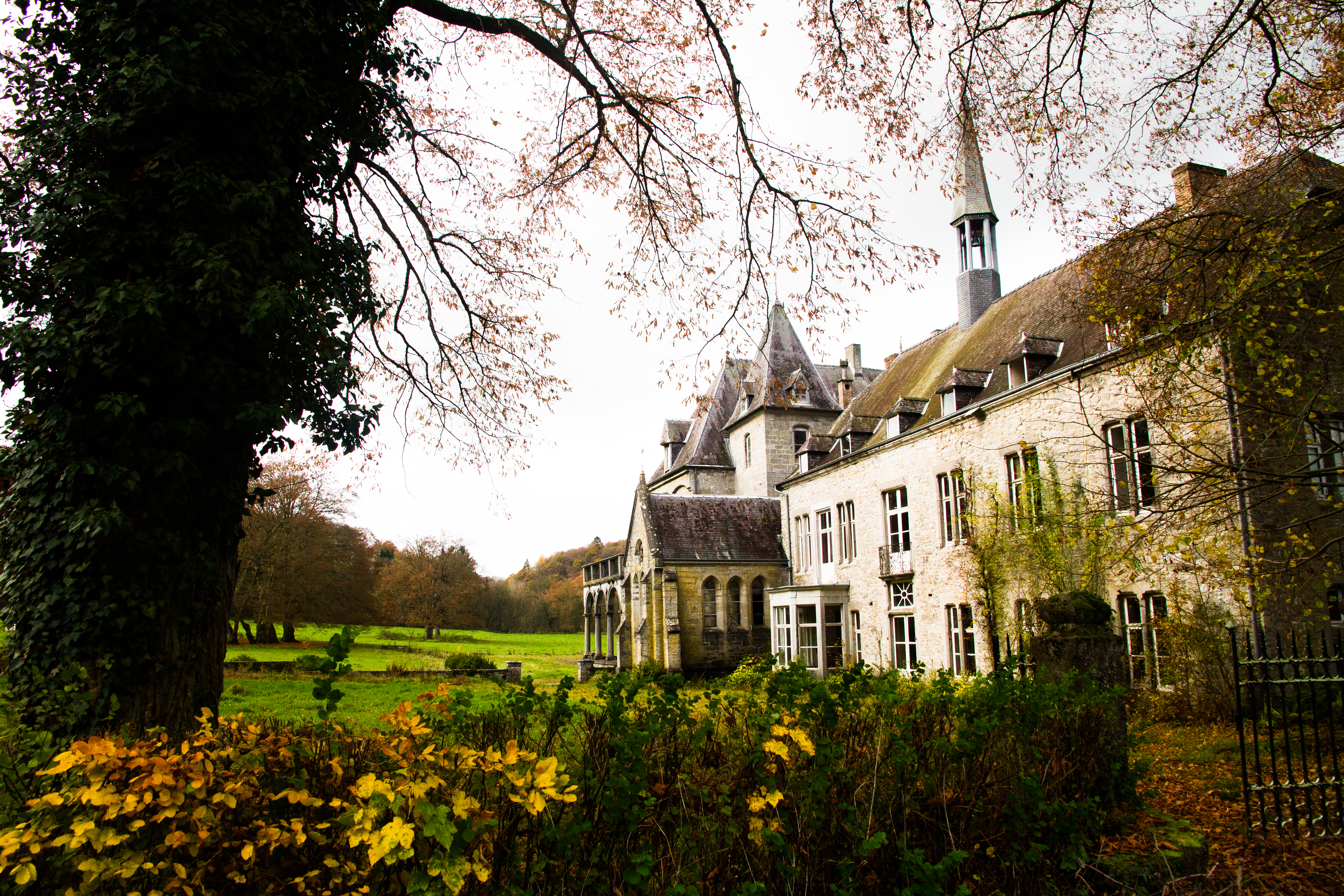
Abbay Maredsous

In 1872, Henri-Philippe acquired the Maredsous estate. His wish was to see a Benedictine abbey established on the site. Félix de Hemptinne, had served with Jules Desclée in the Pontifical Zouaves. He later became a monk at St. Martin's Abbey in Beuron in Germany, with the name in religion of Hildebrand. At that time, the Kulturkampf had arisen in Germany and saw the passage of legislation directed against religious orders. Hildebrand broached the matter of Desclée's interest with his abbot Maurus Wolter, who decided to found a daughter house at Maredsous.

The first monks settled in 1872 at the castle and farm of Maredsous and in 1876 in the new buildings. Hildebrand's father, Joseph de Hemptinne, was a textile manufacturer from Ghent, who had previously worked closely with Jean-Baptiste Bethune. Accordingly the monastery of Maredsous was constructed in the purest Gothic style of the thirteenth century. The plans were drawn by Bethune, inspired by the same motive as the Desclée brothers for the restoration of Christian art.

The family retained title until 1924, at which time it was turned over to the abbey.
