= Erich Otto Volkmann =

German Military Officer

Erich Otto Volkmann (November 23, 1879, Freistadt – December 1938, Potsdam) was a German military career officer, archivist and author of military writings during the Weimar Republic and the Nazi period.

Volkmann began his military career in 1898. In 1900 he became an officer and was appointed as a General Staff officer at the beginning of the First World War. After the war, from 1919 he joined the border service at the East Prussian Volunteer Corps in East Prussia. He retired as a major in 1920 and then joined archival council at the Reich Archives in Potsdam. In 1935 he was promoted to the Upper Archival Council (Oberregierungsrat) there.

He is noted for his research into German morale in the last days of the First World War, and reproduced evidence of mass disaffection from the German Army. He was sympathetic to the army, and aimed to diffuse criticisms by people hostile to the military.
