= Maredsous Abbey =

Belgian Benedictine monastery

Coordinates: 50.302348°N 4.76665°E

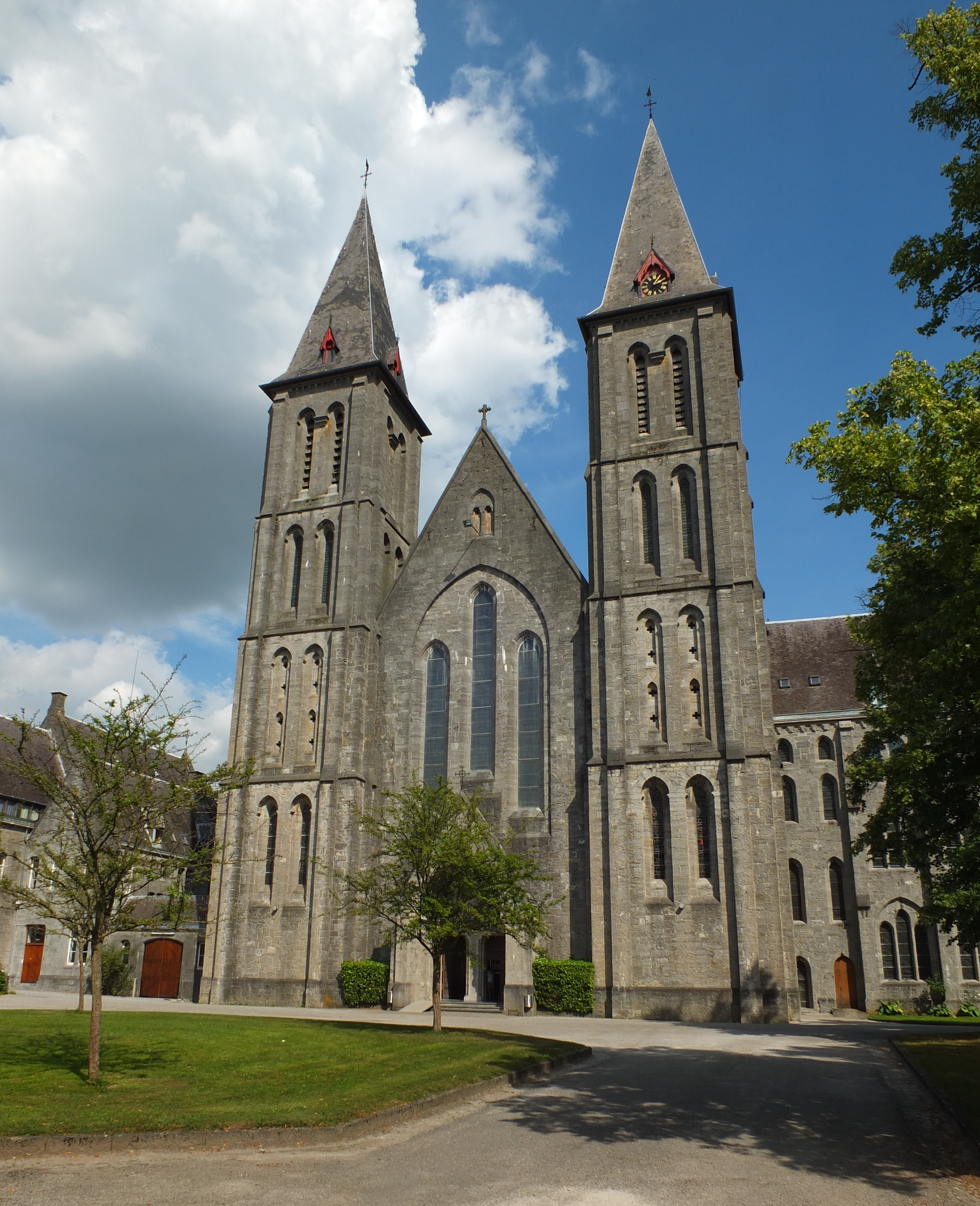
Maredsous Abbey

Maredsous Abbey (French: Abbaye de Maredsous) is a Benedictine monastery at Maredsous, in the municipality of Anhée, Wallonia, Belgium. It is a founding member of the Annunciation Congregation of the Benedictine Confederation.

The abbey was founded as a priory on 15 November 1872 by Beuron Abbey, with the financial support of the Desclée family, who donated some land and paid for the plans and construction of the buildings which were designed by Jean-Baptiste Bethune.

In 1878, the priory was raised to the status of abbey by Pope Leo XIII and became a member of the Congregation of Beuron. The abbey was subsequently affiliated with the Congregation of the Annunciation within the Benedictine confederation, from 1920. By a pontifical letter of Pope Pius XI dated 12 October 1926, the abbey church was awarded the title of minor basilica.

Though various cheeses are products of the abbey's own dairy, Maredsous Beer is no longer brewed there but in the Duvel Moortgat brewery in Flanders, which has been authorised to make and supply it.

== History ==
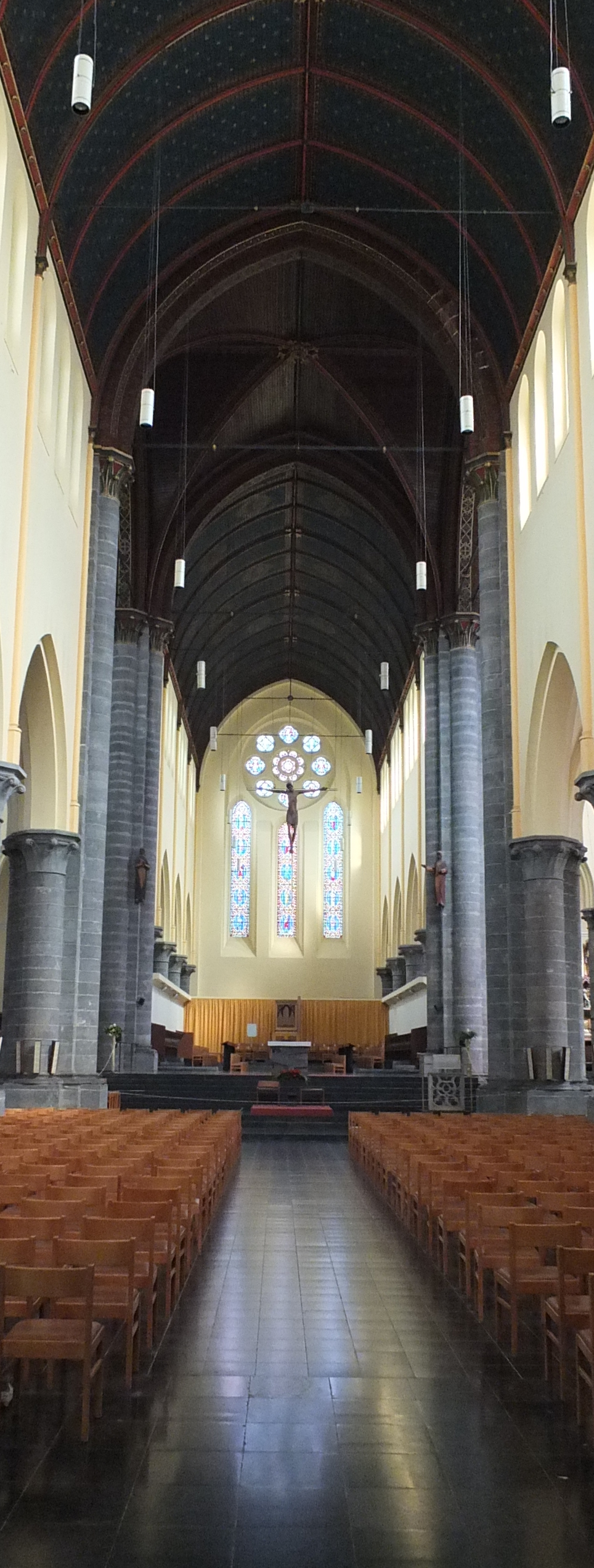
Interior of the Basilica of St. Benedict

Maredsous Abbey was founded on 15 November 1872 by Beuron Abbey in Germany, the founder of many religious houses, at the instigation of Hildebrand de Hemptinne, a Belgian monk at Beuron and later abbot of Maredsous.

The foundation was supported financially by the Desclée family, who paid for the design and construction. The Desclée brothers, printers of liturgical publications, were interested in the restoration of Christian art. Like Hemptinne, Jules Desclée had served in the Papal Zouaves. The brothers chose a picturesque site on an estate of Henri Desclée's in the Province of Namur, for the erection of a monastery in which to establish the monks of Beuron.

The buildings are the masterwork of the architect Jean-Baptiste de Béthune (1831–1894), leader of the neo-Gothic style in Belgium. The overall plan is based on the 13th century Cistercian abbey of Villers at Villers-la-Ville in Walloon Brabant. Construction was finished in 1892. Along the aisles are arranged side chapels.As it is a monastic church, one will not be surprised by the importance of the choir where the stalls of the monks are arranged, and where, several times a day, they sing the Office. By a brief of October 12, 1926, Pope Pius XI erected it as a Basilica.

The frescos however were undertaken by the art school of the mother-house at Beuron, much against the will of Béthune and Desclée, who dismissed the Beuron style as "Assyrian-Bavarian".

The Abbey holds an annual traditional Christmas market, with a popular indoor skating rink.

=== Abbots ===
1. 1872-1874: Jean Blessing, Supérior
2. 1874-1876: Placide Wolter, Prior
3. 1877-1878: Gérard van Caloen, Prior
4. 1878-1890: Placide Wolter, Abbot
5. 1890-1909: Hildebrand de Hemptinne, Abbot
6. 1909-1923: Blessed Columba Marmion, Abbot - buried in the abbey church
7. 1923-1950: Célestin Golenvaux, Abbot
8. 1950-1968: Godefroid Dayez, Abbot
9. 1968-1969: Olivier du Roy, Prior
10. 1969-1972: Olivier du Roy, Abbot
11. 1972-1978: Nicolas Dayez, Prior
12. 1978-2002: Nicolas Dayez, Abbot
13. 2002-2024: Bernard Lorent, Abbot
14. 2024-current: François Lear, Abbot

== Work ==
=== Foundations ===
Maredsous has either founded, or has been instrumental in the foundation of, a number of other Benedictine houses: Sant'Anselmo all'Aventino in Rome (1893); abbeys in Brazil (1895); St. Andrew's Abbey, Zevenkerken, Bruges (1899); Keizersberg Abbey in Leuven (1899); Glenstal Abbey in Ireland (1927); Gihindamuyaga in Rwanda (1958); Quévy Abbey in Hainaut (1969).

=== School of art ===
The idea of an art school, inspired by that at the mother house, led to the foundation of the School of Applied Arts and Crafts, also known as the St. Joseph School. There was a difference of opinion as to whether it should serve more as a place for training poor children as carpenters, blacksmiths, plumbers and cobblers, or whether it should function more as a centre of fine arts and crafts. It was the latter view that prevailed when the school opened in 1903 under the leadership of Father Pascal Rox, and in due course the production began of neo-gothic works of high quality (vestments, pieces of silver, bindings and so on) destined mostly for the abbey itself. The school's activities were curtailed by World War I and it was almost closed down in 1919, but it survived by widening its remit to undertaking paid work in a more modern style for outside customers. From 1939 onwards, the emphasis changed more explicitly towards the training of artists rather than skilled craftsmen. In 1964, after establishing an international reputation, the school merged with the Namur School of Crafts to form the I.A.T.A. (Technical Institute of Arts and Crafts).

== Publications ==
- Le messager des fidèles (1884-89); continued as Revue bénédictine (1890- )
- Anecdota maredsolana (1893- )

== Products ==
=== Maredsous cheese ===
Maredsous Abbey is known for the production of Maredsous cheese, a loaf-shaped cheese made from cow's milk. In 2016 the Cheesemaking Museum was opened, where visitors can see how milk is transformed into cheese and how the cheese is matured.

=== Maredsous beer ===
The abbey also licenses its name to Brouwerij Duvel Moortgat, since 1963 the makers of Maredsous beer.

== See also ==
- Maredret Abbey

== Sources ==
- Misonne, Daniel, 2005. En parcourant l'histoire de Maredsous. Editions de Maredsous.
