= Brussels Soldiers' Council =

Revolutionary council of mutinying German troops in Brussels

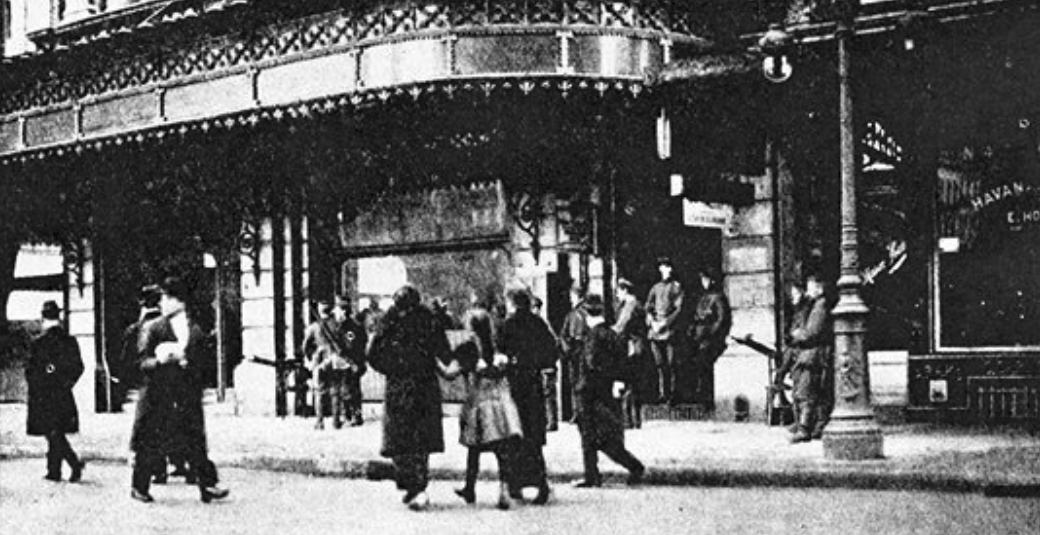
Soldiers on the streets during the Brussels Soldiers Council period

A Soldiers' Council (German: Soldatenrat) was established in Brussels on 10 November 1918 after news of the naval mutiny at Kiel and the November Revolution reached German troops in German-occupied Belgium in the final days of World War I.

Intended as a kind of revolutionary council and socialist and communist in inspiration, it was created after the soldiers mutinied against their officers and seized control of Brussels which had been occupied since August 1914. They tried unsuccessfully to create an alliance with Belgian civilians and socialists and there was sporadic fighting in the city between right-wing and revolutionary German troops. At the same time, the Soldiers' Council struggled to maintain law and order. Its chief concern was to secure the repatriation of its men to Germany. After a few days, the council disbanded and the last German troops left Brussels on 16 November. The Belgian Army under King Albert I finally entered the city on 22 November 1918.

The Brussels soldiers' council was contemporary with another similar body established at Beverloo at the same time. Both looked to the more important soldiers' council at Cologne for nominal leadership.

Notable people involved in the Council included Carl Einstein.

== See also ==
- Luxembourg rebellions
