= Zedelgem =

- Municipality
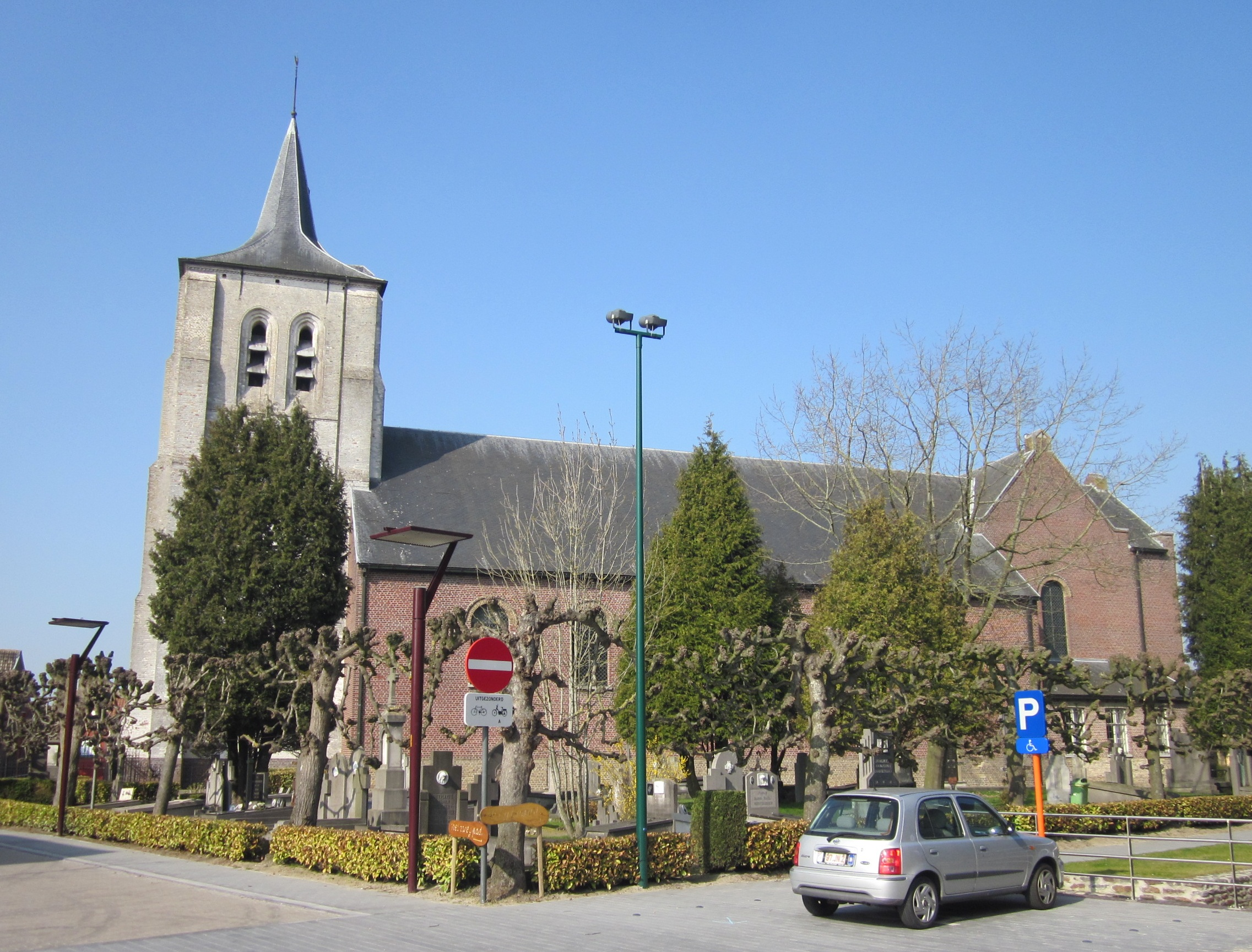

- Flag Coat of arms

- Location of Zedelgem in West Flanders
- Interactive map of Zedelgem
- Location in Belgium
- Coordinates: 51°08′N 03°08′E
- Country: Belgium
- Community: Flemish Community
- Region: Flemish Region
- Province: West Flanders
- Arrondissement: Bruges

Government
  - Mayor: Annick Vermeulen (CD&V-Nieuw)
  - Governing party: CD&V-Nieuw

Area
  - Total: 60.66 km^{2} (23.42 sq mi)

Population (2018-01-01)
  - Total: 22,635
  - Density: 373.1/km^{2} (966.4/sq mi)
- Postal codes: 8210, 8211
- NIS code: 31040
- Area codes: 050
- Website: www.zedelgem.be

Zedelgem (Dutch pronunciation: [ˈzeːdəlɣɛm]; West Flemish: Zillegem [ˈzɛləɦæm]) is a municipality located in the Belgian province of West Flanders. The municipality comprises the villages of Aartrijke, Loppem, Veldegem and Zedelgem proper. On January 1, 2019, Zedelgem had a total population of 22,813. The total area is 60.34 km^{2} (23.30 sq mi) which gives a population density of 378/km^{2} (980/sq mi).

Zedelgem and the surrounding area was home to prisoner-of-war camps towards the end of World War II. Although the camp was disbanded and prisoners released after the war, the site remained military domain until 1994. It is now a nature park.

== Notable people ==
- F.R. Boschvogel (1902–1994), writer.

== See also ==
- New Holland Agriculture

== Gallery ==
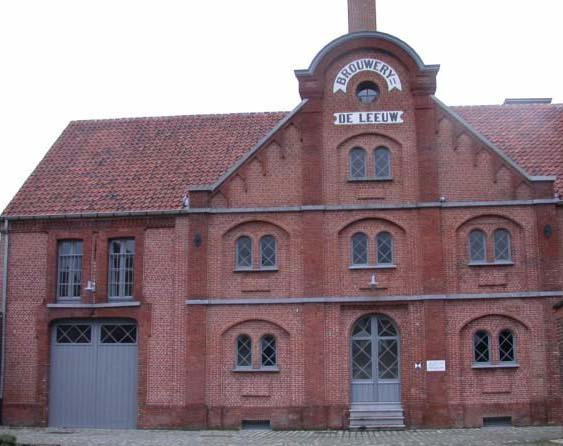
Brewery De Leeuw in Aartrijke

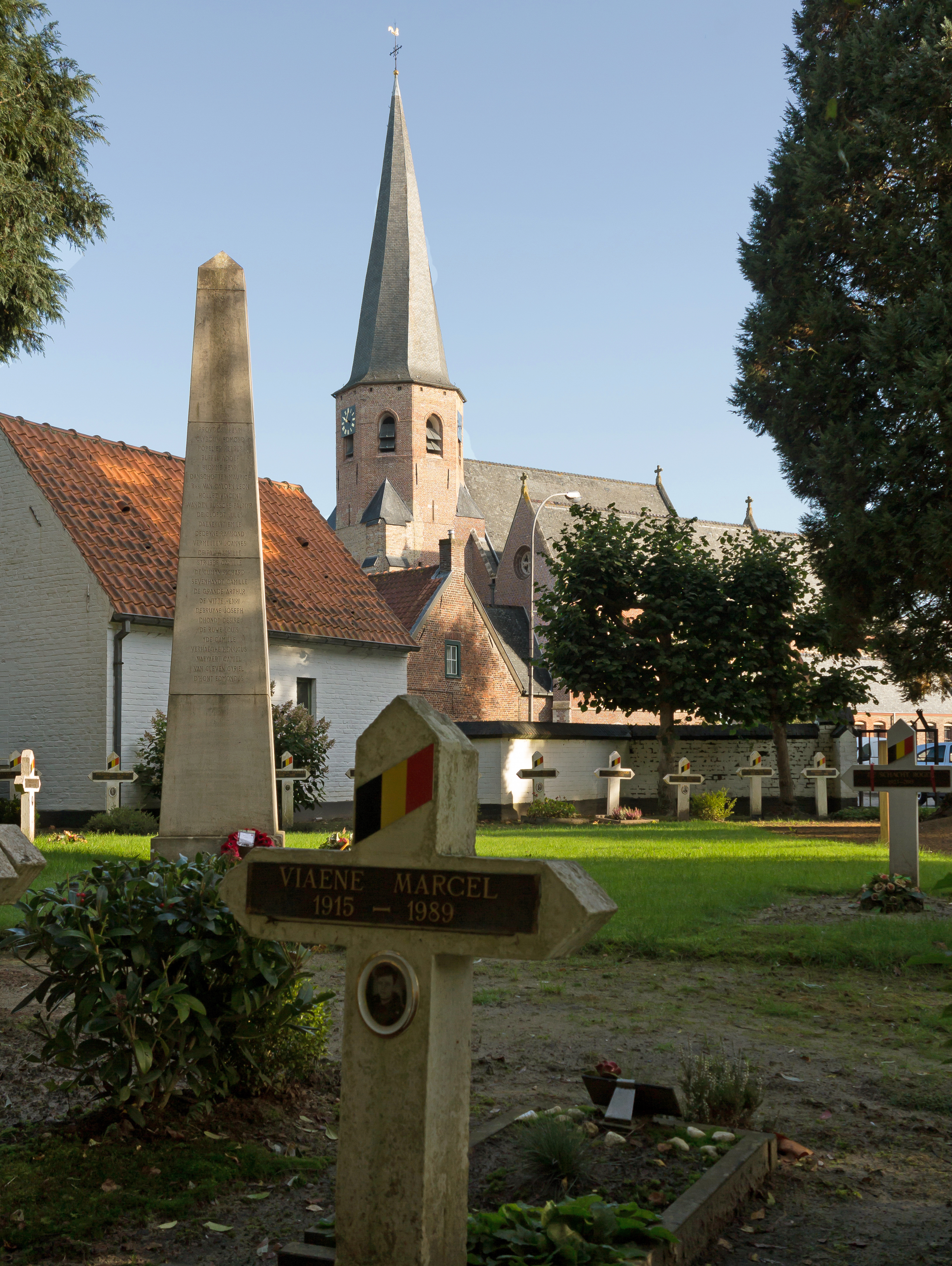
Church and churchyard in Loppem

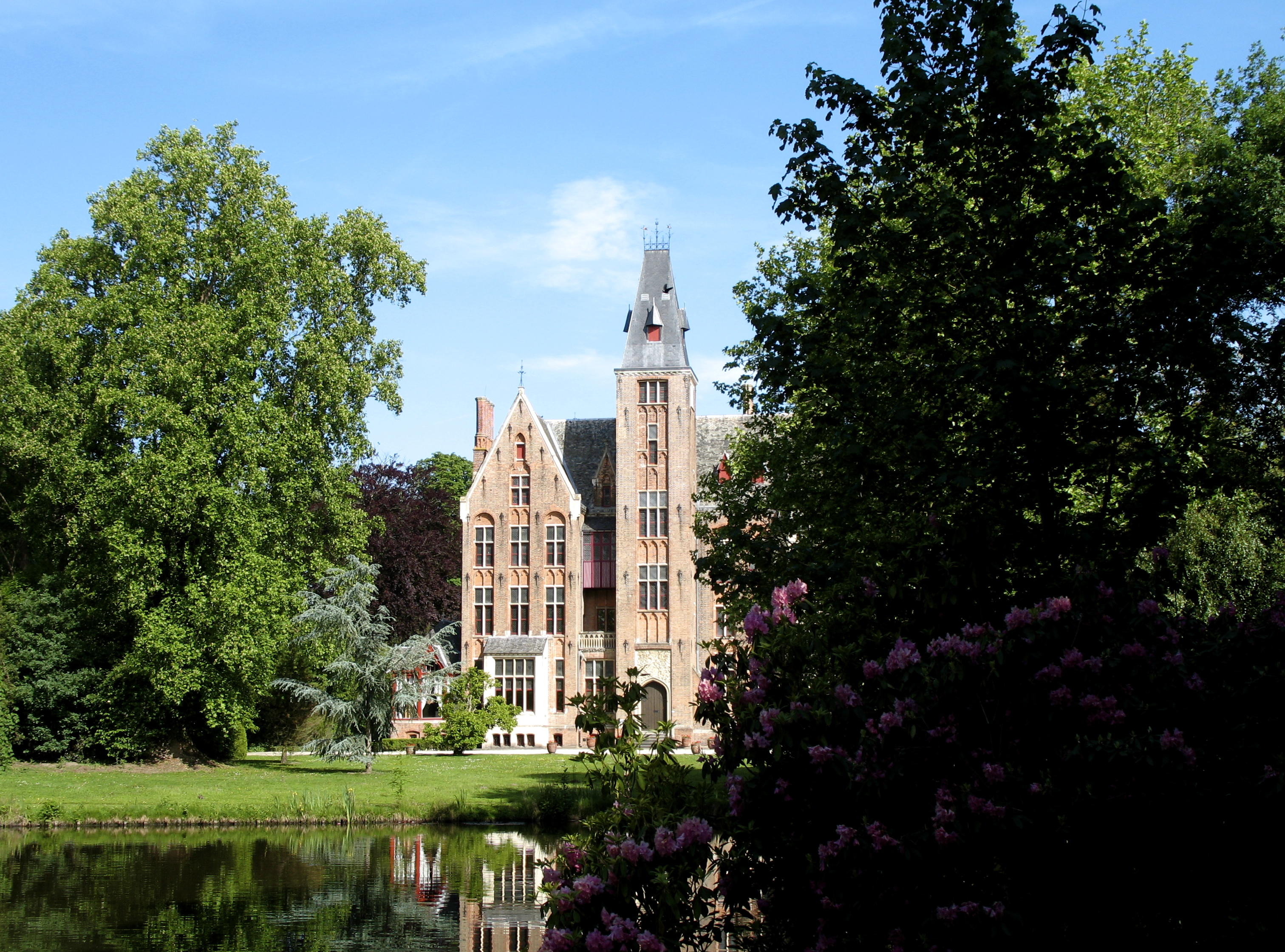
Loppem Castle in Loppem

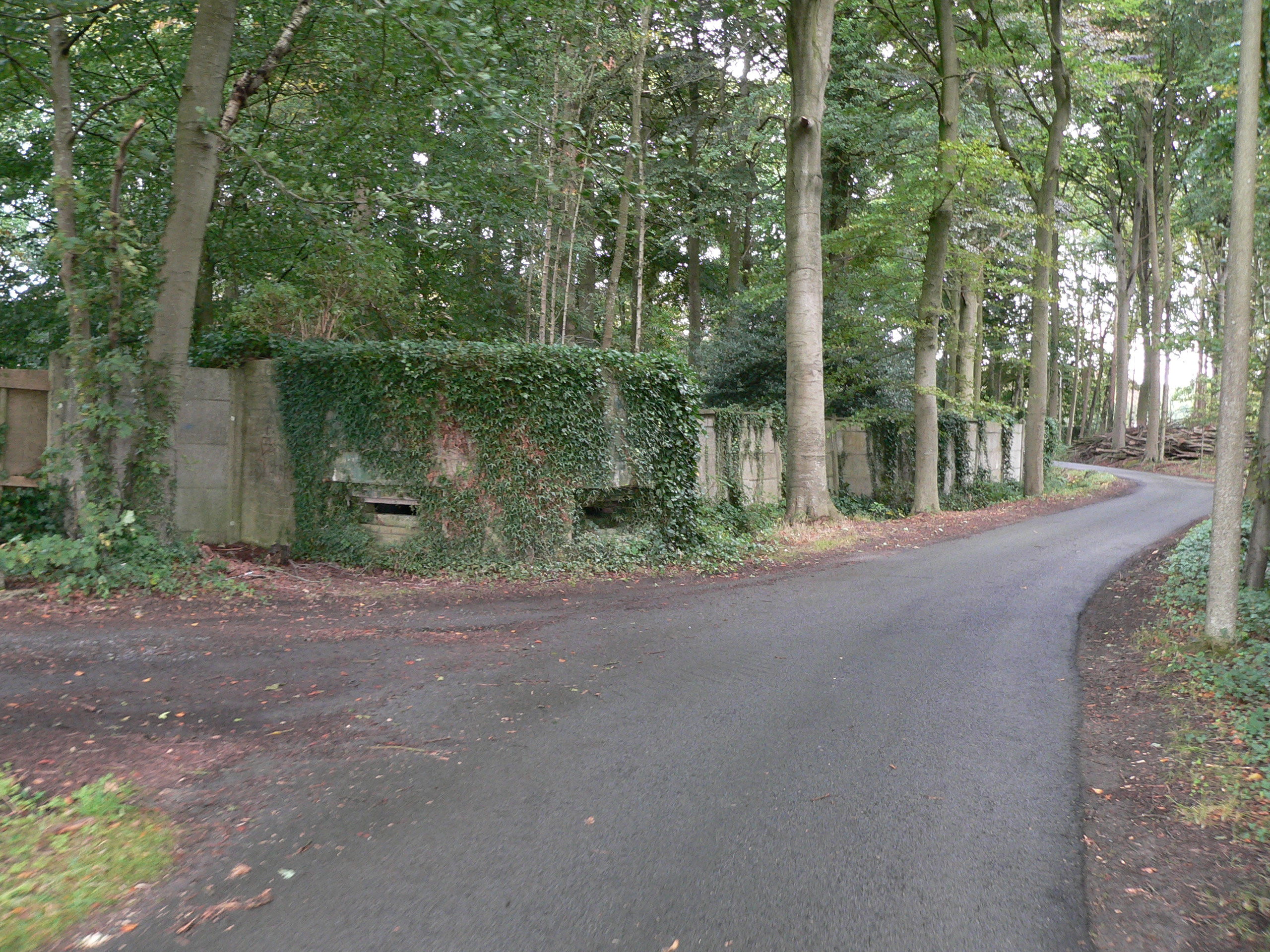
Concrete casemates in Loppem

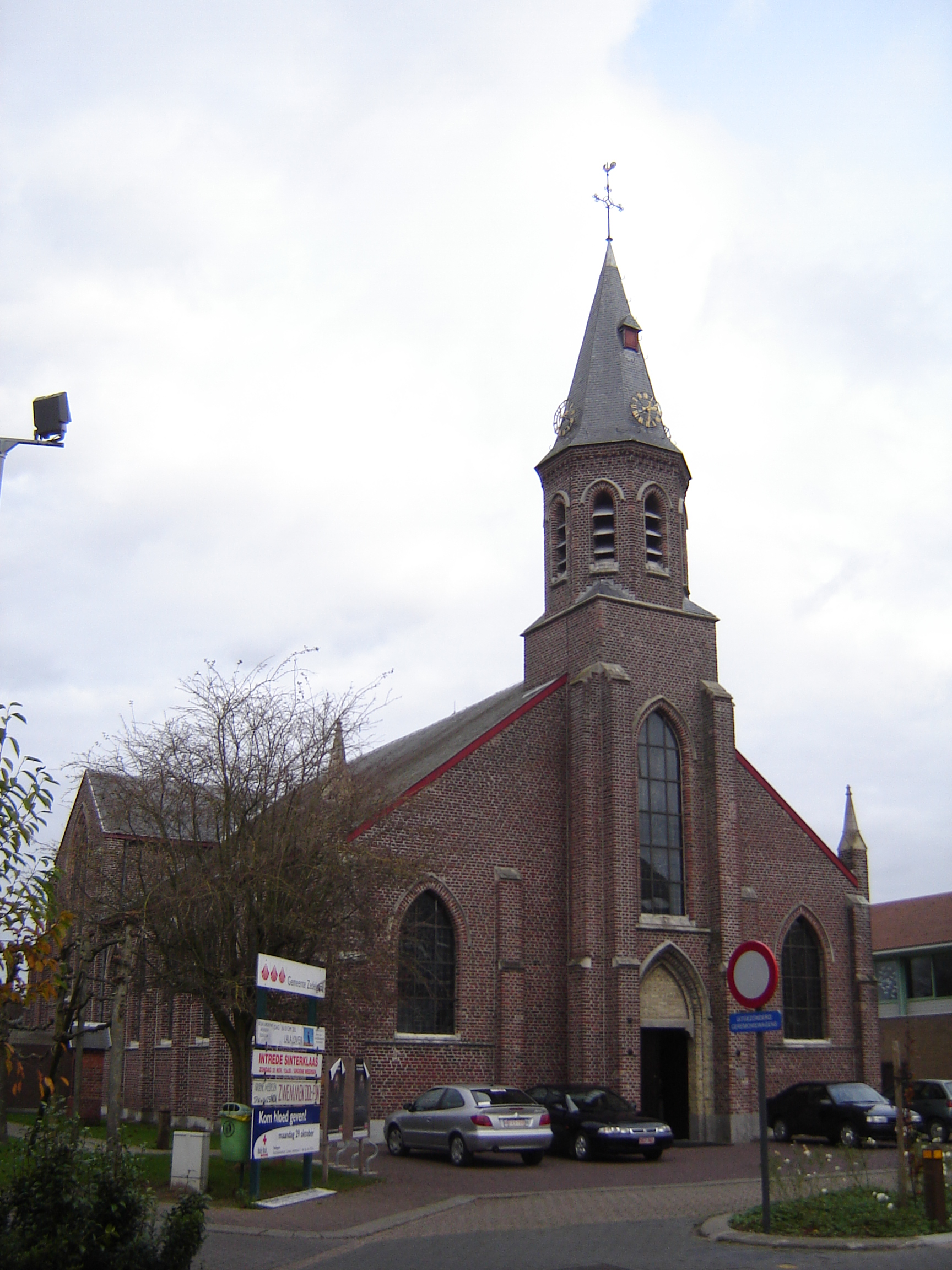
Onze-Lieve-Vrouwe church in Veldegem
