= Hildebrand de Hemptinne =

Belgian Benedictine monk

The Most Reverend Hildebrand de Hemptinne O.S.B.
- 1st Abbot Primate of the Benedictine Confederation
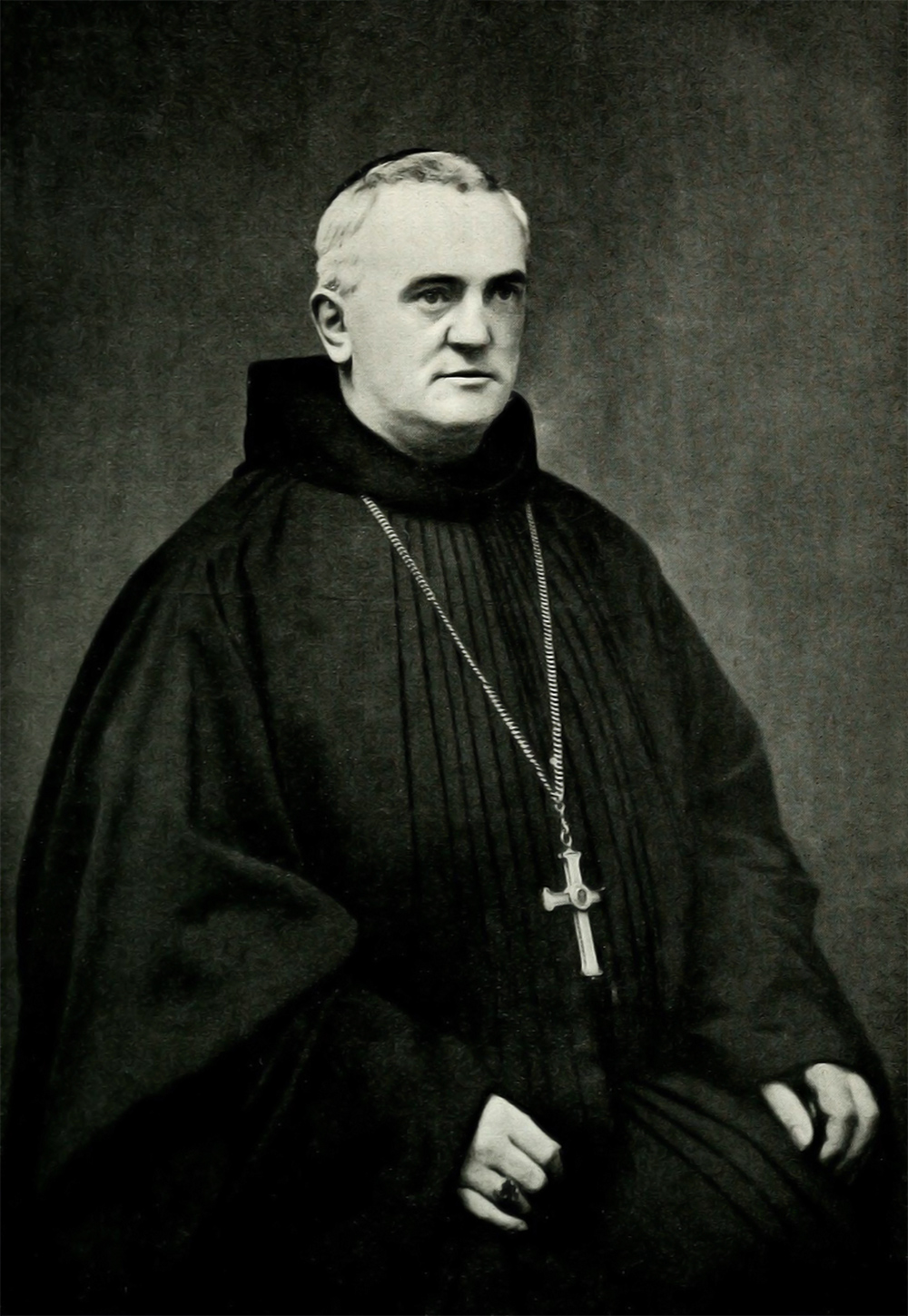
- Church: Catholic Church
- Elected: 12 July 1893
- Term ended: 3 August 1913
- Predecessor: Position established
- Successor: Fidelis von Stotzingen
- Other post: 1st Abbot of Sant'Anselmo all'Aventino
- Previous posts: Prior in Erdington Abbey (1876–1881); Prior in Maredsous Abbey (1881 – 1890); 2nd Abbot of Maredsous Abbey (1890 – 1909)

Orders
- Ordination: 11 June 1872 by Peter Joseph Blum
- Rank: Abbot Primate

Personal details
- Born: Félix de Hemptinne; 10 June 1849 Ghent, Belgium
- Died: 13 August 1913 (aged 64) Beuron Archabbey
- Buried: Beuron Archabbey
- Denomination: Roman Catholic
- Parents: Joseph de Hemptinne (father); Pauline Gonthijn (mother)

Hildebrand de Hemptinne (10 June 1849 – 13 August 1913) was a Belgian Benedictine monk of Beuron Archabbey, the second Abbot of Maredsous Abbey, and the first Abbot Primate of the Benedictine Confederation.

== Biography ==
Félix de Hemptinne was born in Ghent, Belgium on 10 June 1849, the second of the seven children of Joseph de Hemptinne and Pauline Gonthijn. His parents were very devoted Roman Catholics and his father was a wealthy industrialist of Ultramontane views. Félix had heard the call of Pope Pius IX to defend the Papal States, but he was too young to join the cause. At the age of 16 he finally obtained his father's permission to enlist in the Papal Zouaves, serving until experiencing a vocation to monastic life.

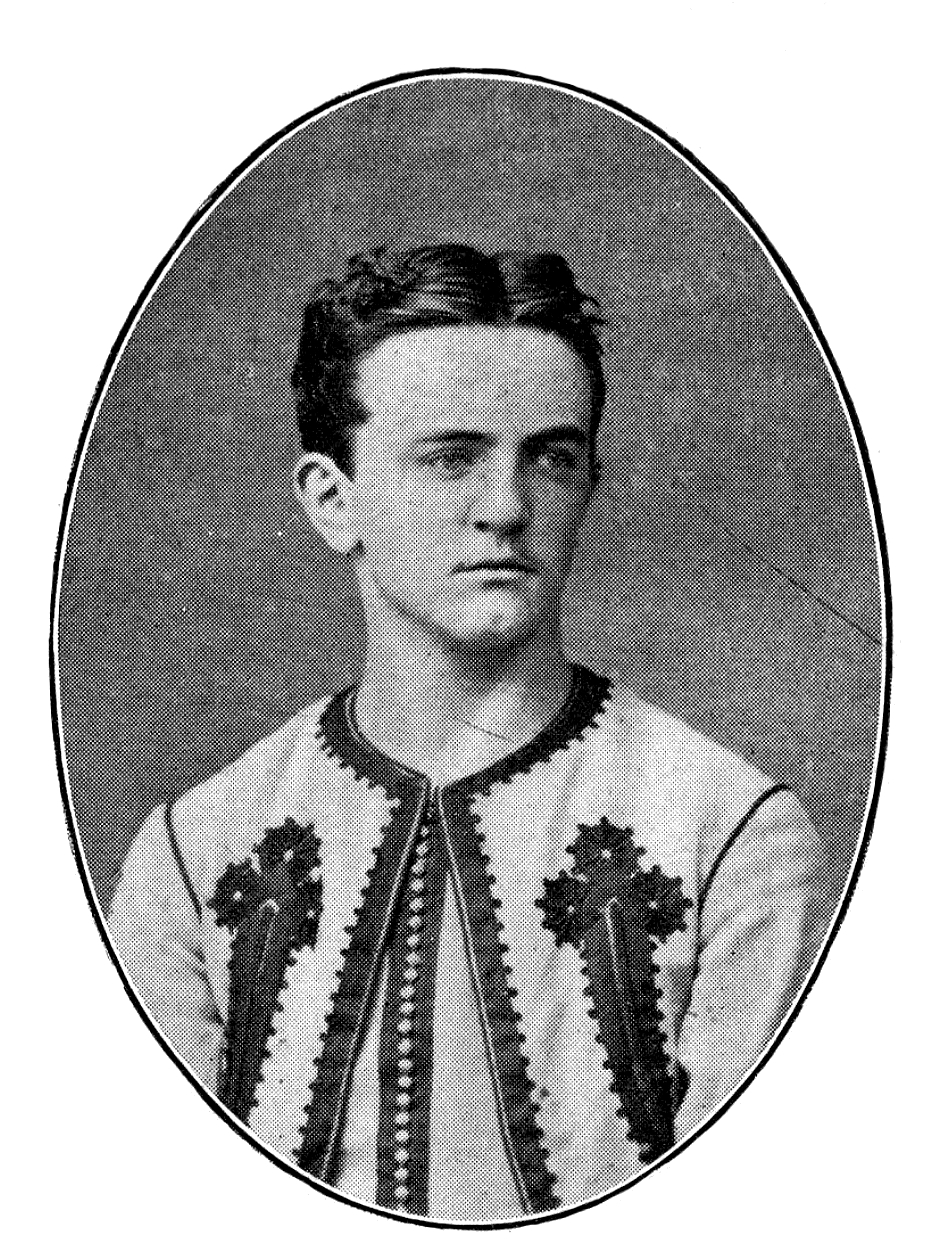
Félix de Hemptinne as a papal zouave

On 3 February 1869 Félix entered Beuron Archabbey in Germany, made his religious profession on 15 August 1870, and received the name "Hildebrand". He had been drawn to this newly founded monastery led by Archabbot Maurus Wolter with the hope of one day restoring a monastic presence in his home country of Belgium. After persevering through many health concerns, he was ordained as a Roman Catholic priest on 11 June 1872. On 15 October of that same year he would return to his home country as a founding member of a new foundation that would later become Maredsous Abbey. He later returned to Beuron the following year where he began service as the Master of Novices. Due to the Kulturkampf, he would flee to Austria and later to England where he was appointed as the Prior in 1876 of a new monastic community in Erdington. In 1881 he would return to Maredsous Abbey where he would serve as Prior under Abbot Placidus Wolter. From 1886 to 1890 he was secretary to Archabbot Maurus Wolter at Beuron Abbey. At the death of Archabbot Maurus in 1890, Abbot Placidus at Maredsous was elected as the new archabbot of Beuron Archabbey. On 10 August 1890 Hildebrand was elected as the second abbot of Maredsous Abbey in succession to Placidus, who had succeeded Maurus. He received his abbatial blessing at the Abbey of Monte Cassino on 5 October 1890 with the officiating prelate being the Cardinal Guglielmo Sanfelice D'Acquavella, O.S.B. the Archbishop of Naples.

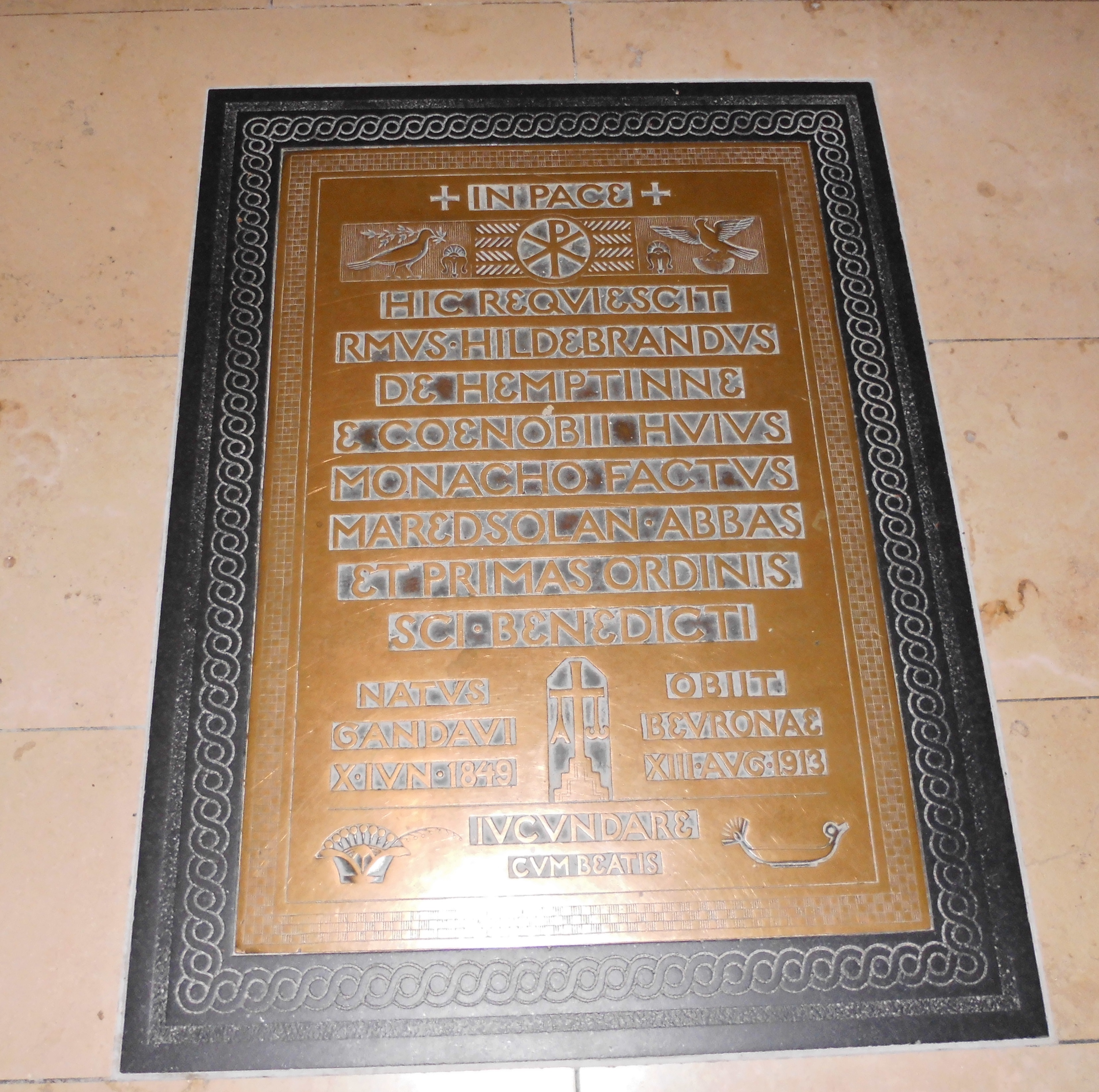
The tomb of Hildebrand at Beuron Archabbey

Hemptinne set about to not only serve his own abbey, but also completed a new residence for nuns near his monastery, sent monks to establish foundations in Brazil, and founded a house of studies for monks to attend the Catholic University of Louvain. He had already made an impression on Pope Leo XIII when he had visited him after the earlier abbatial blessing in 1890. The Pope then asked Hemptinne to draw up plans for a new complex to house the College of Sant'Anselmo. His plans were accepted and the laying of the cornerstone on the Aventine Hill in Rome on 19 April 1893 would also see the gathering of abbots from around the world. After this occasion, the Pope let it be known with a brief (Summum Semper) on 12 July 1893 that he would be forming a new Benedictine Confederation and that Abbot Hildebrand de Hemptinne would be his choice as the first Abbot Primate. Hemptinne was elected in 1893 and his complex now known as Sant'Anselmo all'Aventino was completed in 1900. This complex housed the College of Sant'Anselmo, the Church of Sant'Anselmo, the Pontificio Ateneo Sant'Anselmo, and the curial headquarters of the Benedictine Confederation where the Abbot Primate would reside and oversee it all.

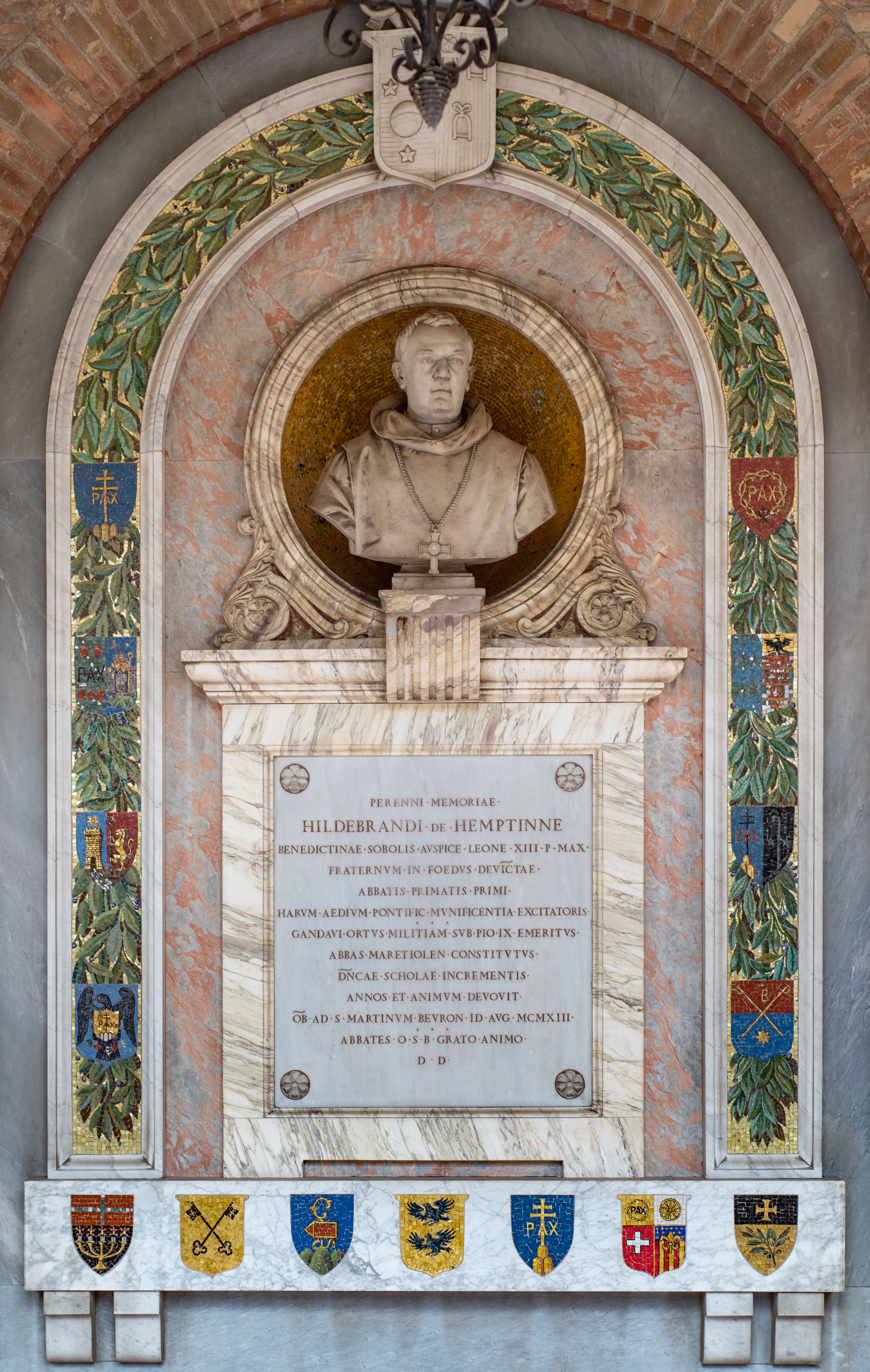
Monument in honor of the abbot of the College of Saint Anselm in Rome.

He continued to serve as both Abbot Primate and Abbot of Maredsous for sixteen years. In 1909 he resigned his position in Belgium to focus on his global role, travelling to the United States in 1910, and visiting 42 monasteries there. In 1912, after a stroke, he offered his resignation on health grounds but was kept in his position by Pope Pius X, with a coadjutor appointed to lighten his work. The monk elected was Abbot Fidelis von Stotzingen of Maria Laach Abbey. Hemptinne died at Beuron Archabbey on 13 August 1913 and was buried in the abbey church.

Catholic Church titles
Preceded by Placide Wolter	2nd Abbot of the Maredsous Abbey; 10 August 1890 – 28 September 1909	Succeeded by Columba Marmion
New office	1st Abbot Primate of the Benedictine Confederation; 12 July 1893 – 13 August 1913	Succeeded by Fidelis von Stotzingen
