= Largo São Bento =

Region in São Paulo, Brazil

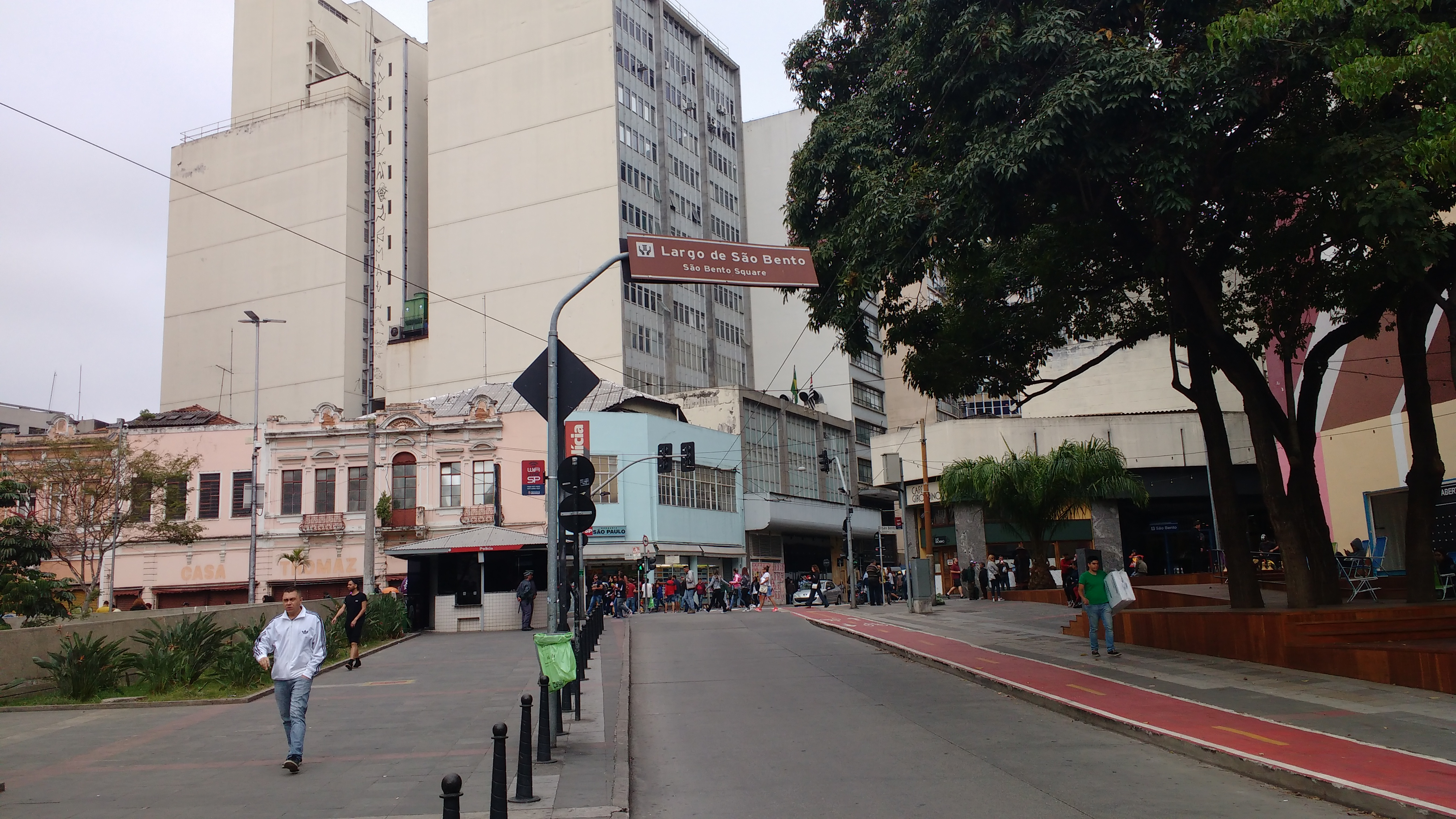
- Largo São Bento

- Location within São Paulo Location within Brazil
- Location: São Paulo, São Paulo; Brazil
- Coordinates: 23°32′38″S 46°38′02″W

Largo São Bento, considered one of the oldest public spaces in São Paulo, was occupied shortly after the city was founded in 1554. The area is home to the Basilica of Our Lady of the Assumption, the São Bento School and the School of Philosophy of São Bento, which collectively form the Monastery of Saint Benedict, one of São Paulo's tourist attractions.

== History ==
In the past, the area was home to the taba of Cacique Tibiriçá, father of the indigenous woman Bartira who married the pioneer João Ramalho. The village remained there until the year the Cacique died, in 1562. Tibiriçá, along with other natives, contributed to defending the future city of São Paulo from attacks by enemy tribes, since the site was strategically positioned on top of a hill, which provided a wide view of the area around the town.

In 1598, the Benedictine Friar Mauro Teixeira chose Largo São Bento for the foundation of a small chapel under the invocation of Saint Benedict. The building would stand between the Anhangabaú and Tamanduateí rivers, covering the Anhangabaú Valley on one side and the current 25 de Março Street on the other. Around 1600, friars Mateus de Ascensão, Antonio de Assunção and Bento da Purificação came to São Paulo and transformed the church into a monastery.

Fifty years later, Fernão Dias Pais, known as "the emerald hunter", donated a large sum of money for the construction of a new church. In gratitude, his remains, as well as those of his wife Maria Garcia, were kept in the monastery. In addition to the dates of his birth and death, a plaque in the ground reads: "Great benefactors of this abbey / Their remains transferred to this tomb / Benedictine gratitude".

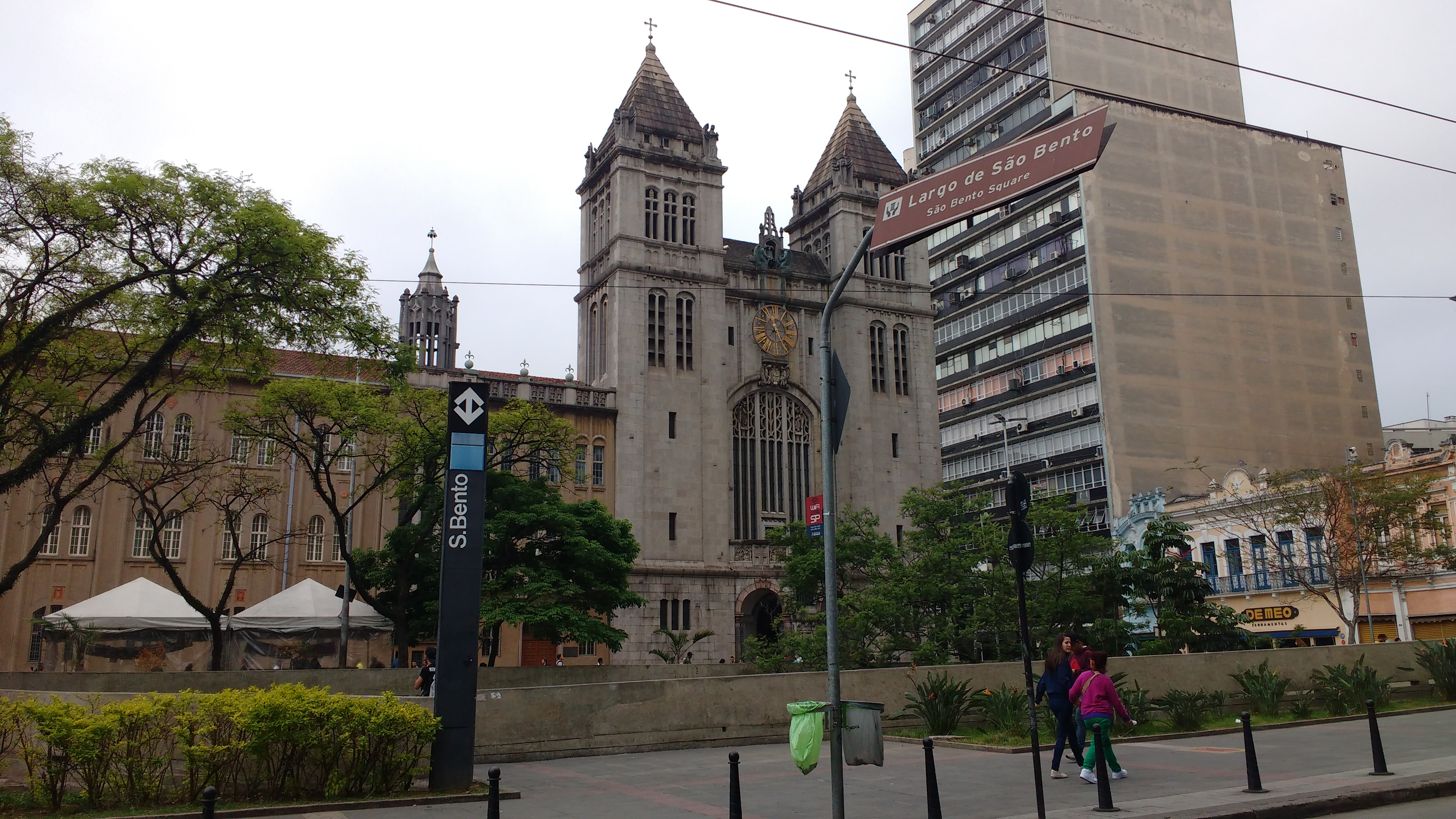
View from the front of Largo São Bento and Líbero Badaró Street.

In 1854, the largo underwent a redevelopment in line with European models of the time due to the intense traffic caused by two large hotels installed in its vicinity. On December 23, 1866, the oldest bathhouse, Seria Paulista, was inaugurated in Largo São Bento, with eight marble bathtubs, taps and lead plumbing.

In July 1900, Miguel Kruse assumed the direction of the monastery. In 1903, in an attempt to create a proper secondary school, the São Bento School founded under the administration of the Order. In 1908, the Faculty of Philosophy was founded, the first in Brazil and currently linked to the PUC in São Paulo. In 1911, the first abbey of Benedictine nuns in South America, the Monastery of St. Mary, was established.

Also in 1900, the city's first streetcar line left from Largo São Bento; 10 years later, construction began on the new monastery, according to a project by architect Richard Berndl, from Munich, Germany. The work was finished in 1921 and the following year the ceremony of its consecration took place, leading to the current Benedictine complex.

The last major transformation was caused by the metro during the 1970s, when the square gained benches, a promenade, gardens and more intense movement. In 1998, to commemorate the 400th anniversary of the Monastery of Saint Benedict, the lighting and facade of the building were restored, Largo São Bento was reconfigured and the great Walcker organ, an instrument with more than 6,000 pipes inaugurated in 1954, was restored.

== Cultural events ==
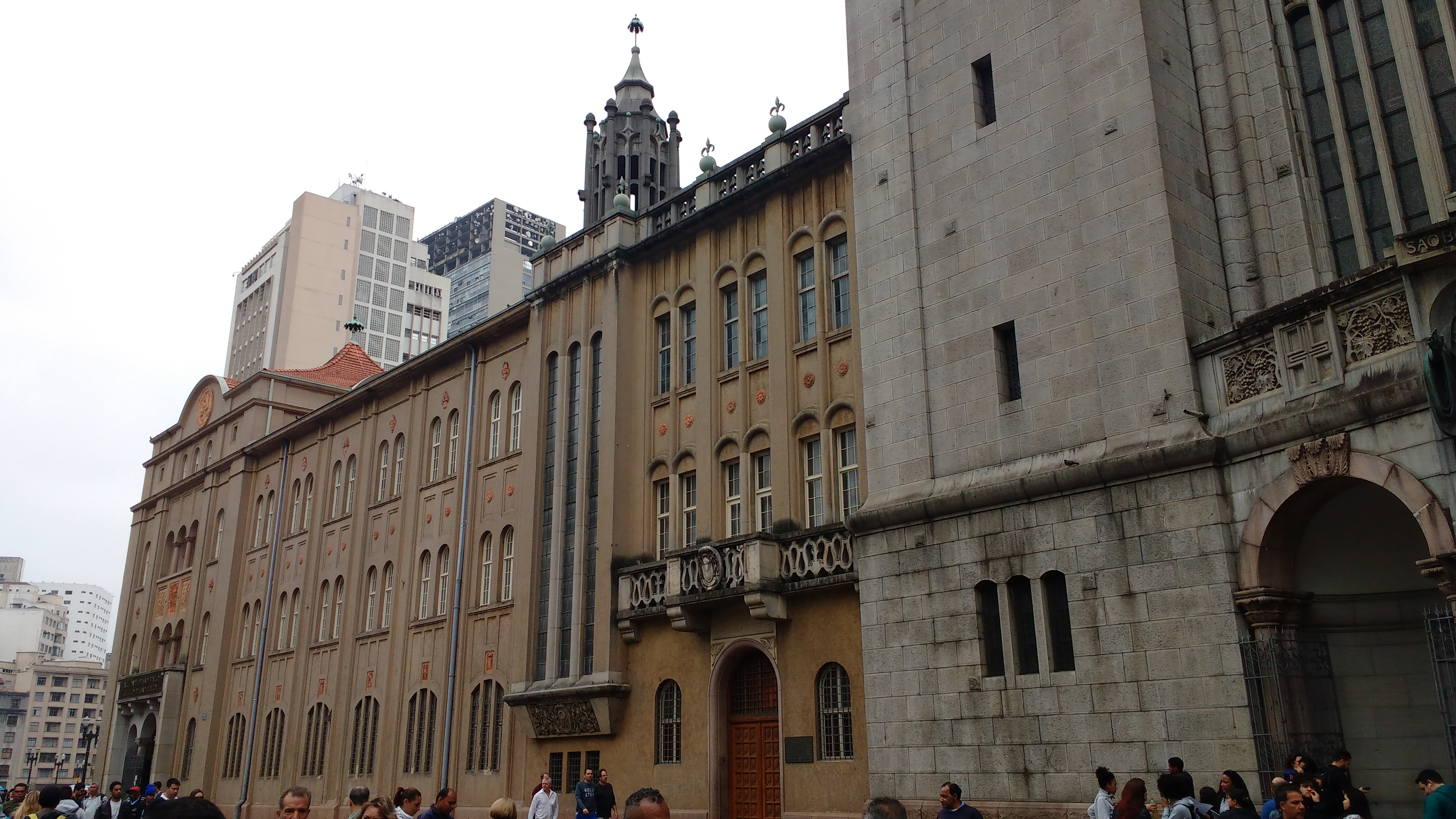
Facade of the Monastery of Saint Benedict.

Every Sunday at 10 a.m., the Monastery of Saint Benedict holds a mass accompanied by a choir that sings beautiful Gregorian chants. As well as religion, there is also a gastronomic tradition at Largo São Bento. The monastery's bakery offers famous preparations such as Bolo dos Monges, Bolo Santa Escolástica, Pão de São Bento and Pão de Mel Benedictus. In the area near the square, visitors can find traditional bars and restaurants, such as Casa Mathilde and Café Girondino.

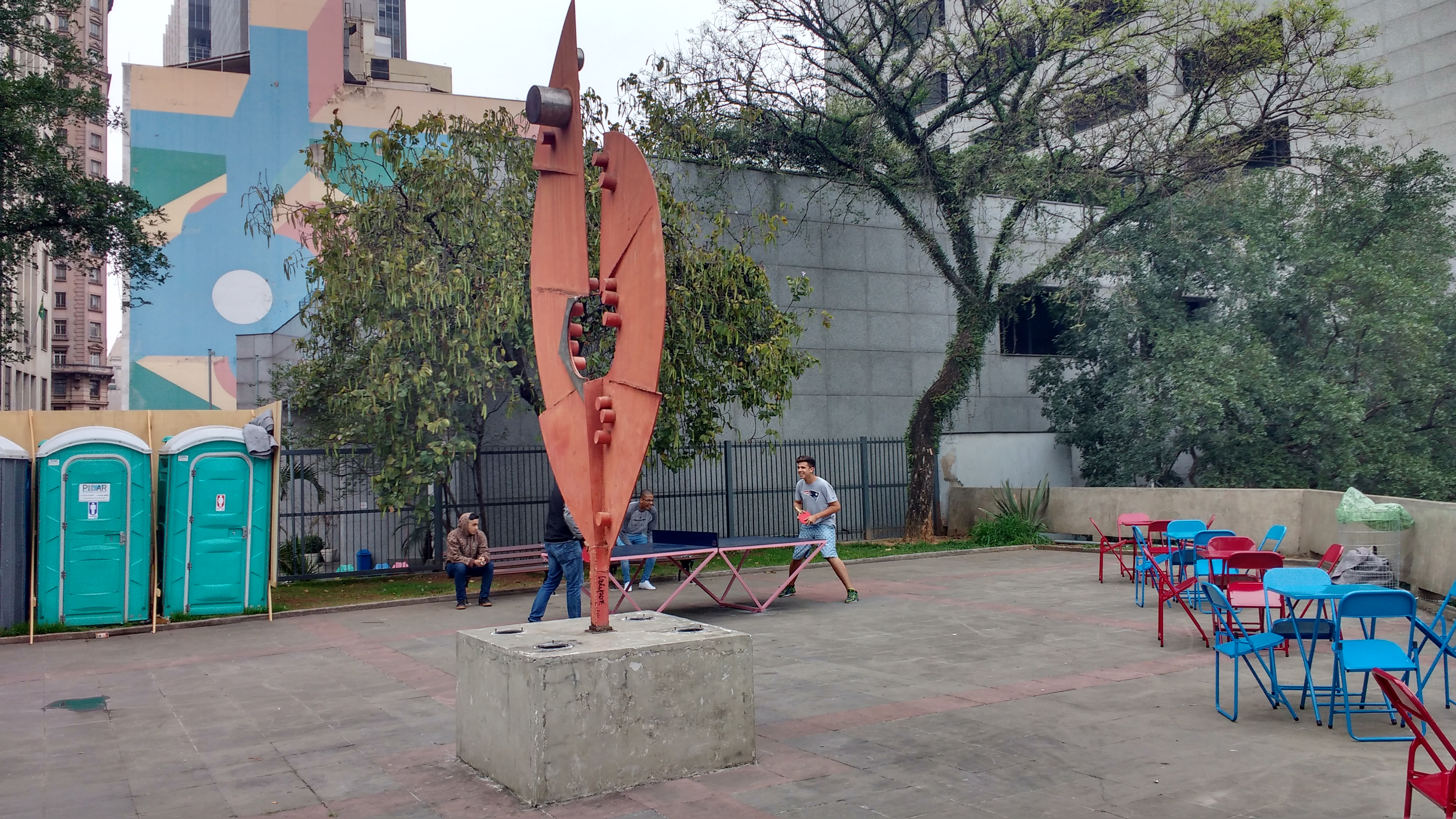
Sculpture by the artist Caciporé Torres.

Another attraction is the library at the Monastery of Saint Benedict, with more than a hundred thousand titles, many of them rare and that came to Brazil with the Benedictine monks in 1598. It is possible to find everything from the 15th century Gutenberg Bible to books such as Dan Brown's The Da Vinci Code and current publications that satisfy the demands of students on the Philosophy and Theology courses offered by the São Bento College. Students have access to a room with tables and computers where they can consult the collection, but access to the room where the books are stored is restricted to the Benedictine monks who live there. Interested outsiders can request a visitor's permit.

The square also hosts regular events such as the São Bento Book Fair, organized by the library, exhibitions like O Pequeno Príncipe Descobre o Mosteiro, which took place in August 2016, and the São Bento International Organ Festival, held annually in the Basilica since 1994. Banks and stores at São Bento Station offer convenience to those passing through the square. Public toilets, a tennis table and a sculpture by the artist Caciporé Torres complete this space.

== Gallery ==
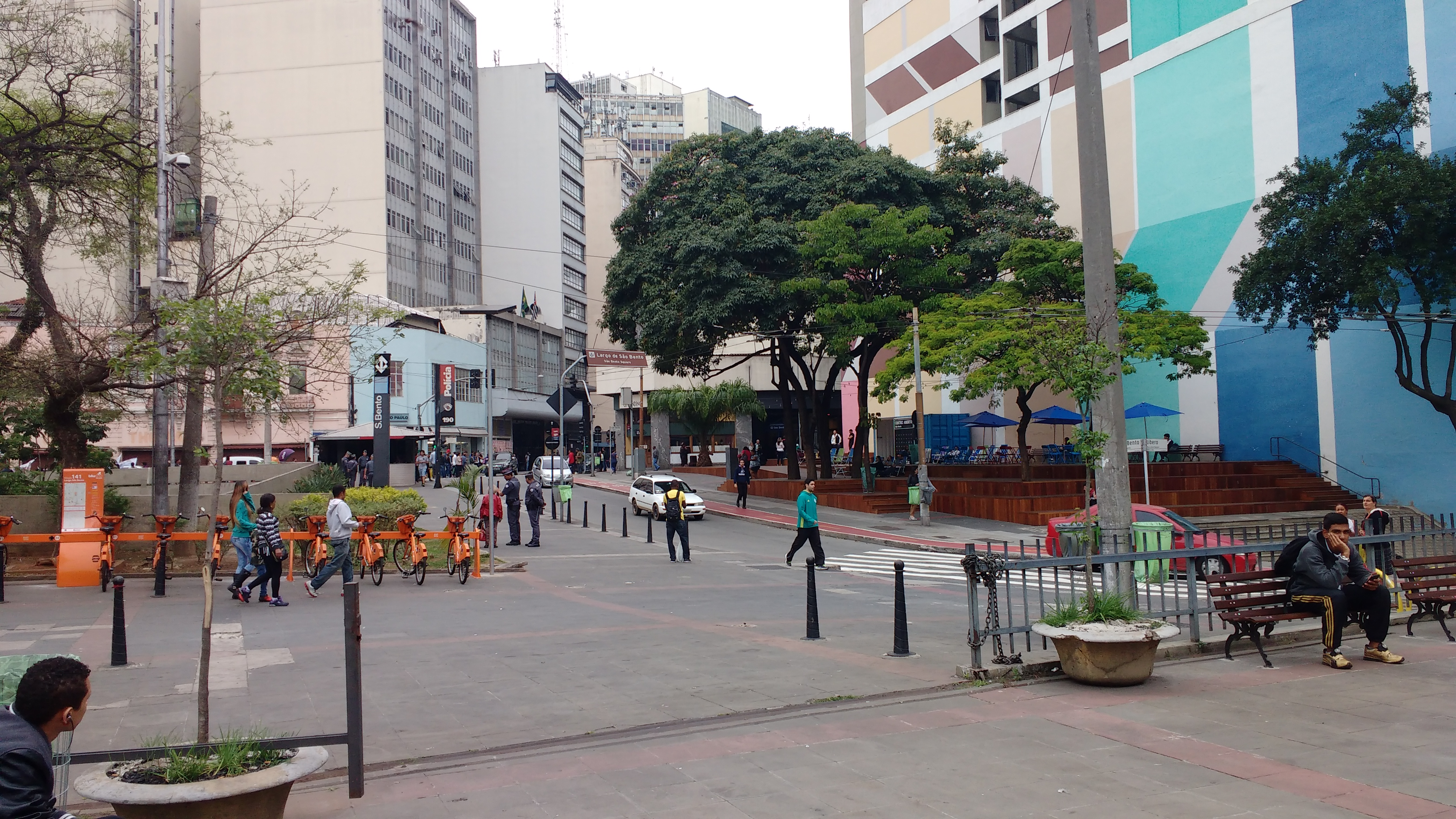
View of Largo with Líbero Badaró Street.

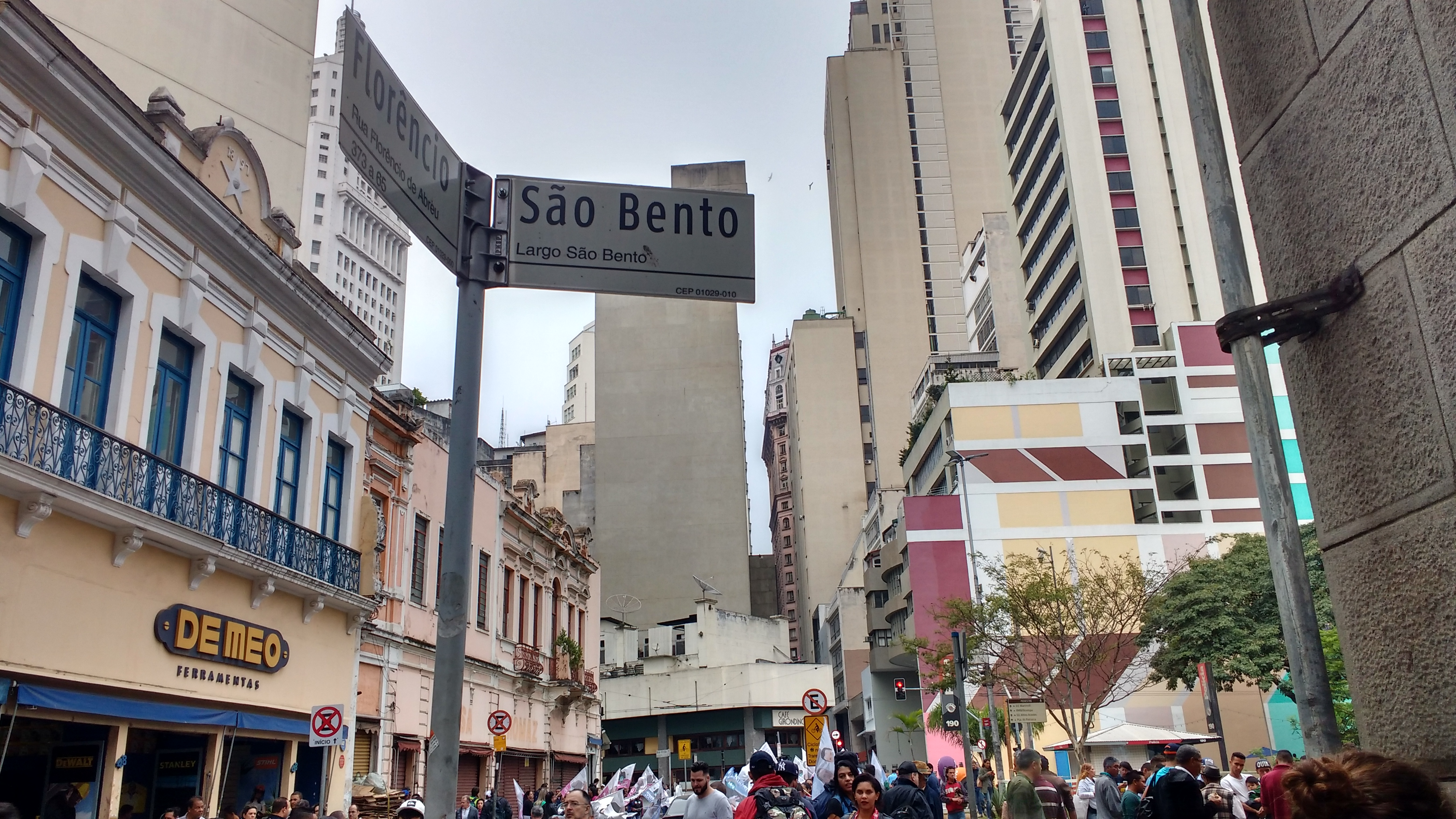
Sign indicating Largo São Bento.

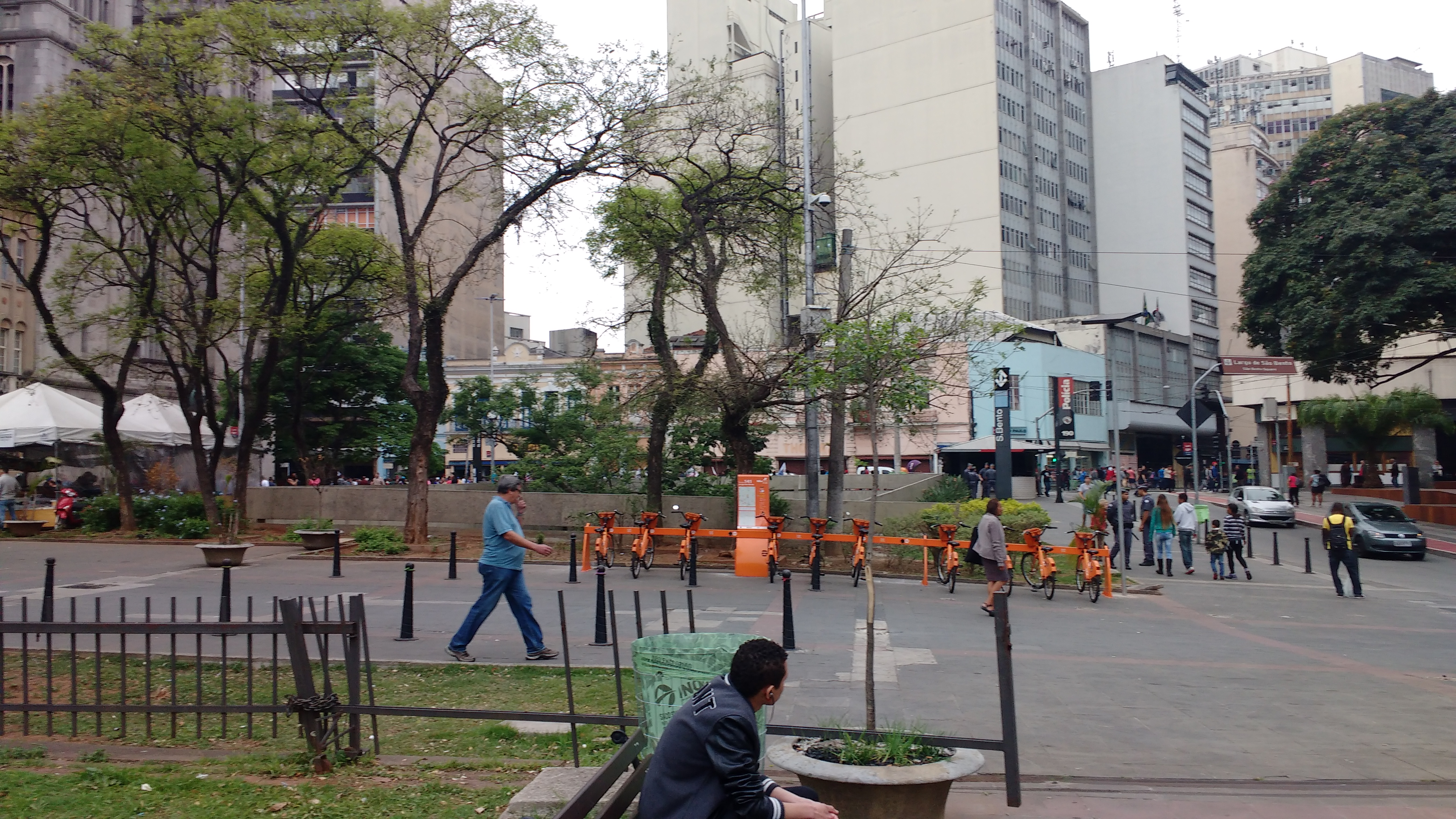
View east from Largo São Bento.

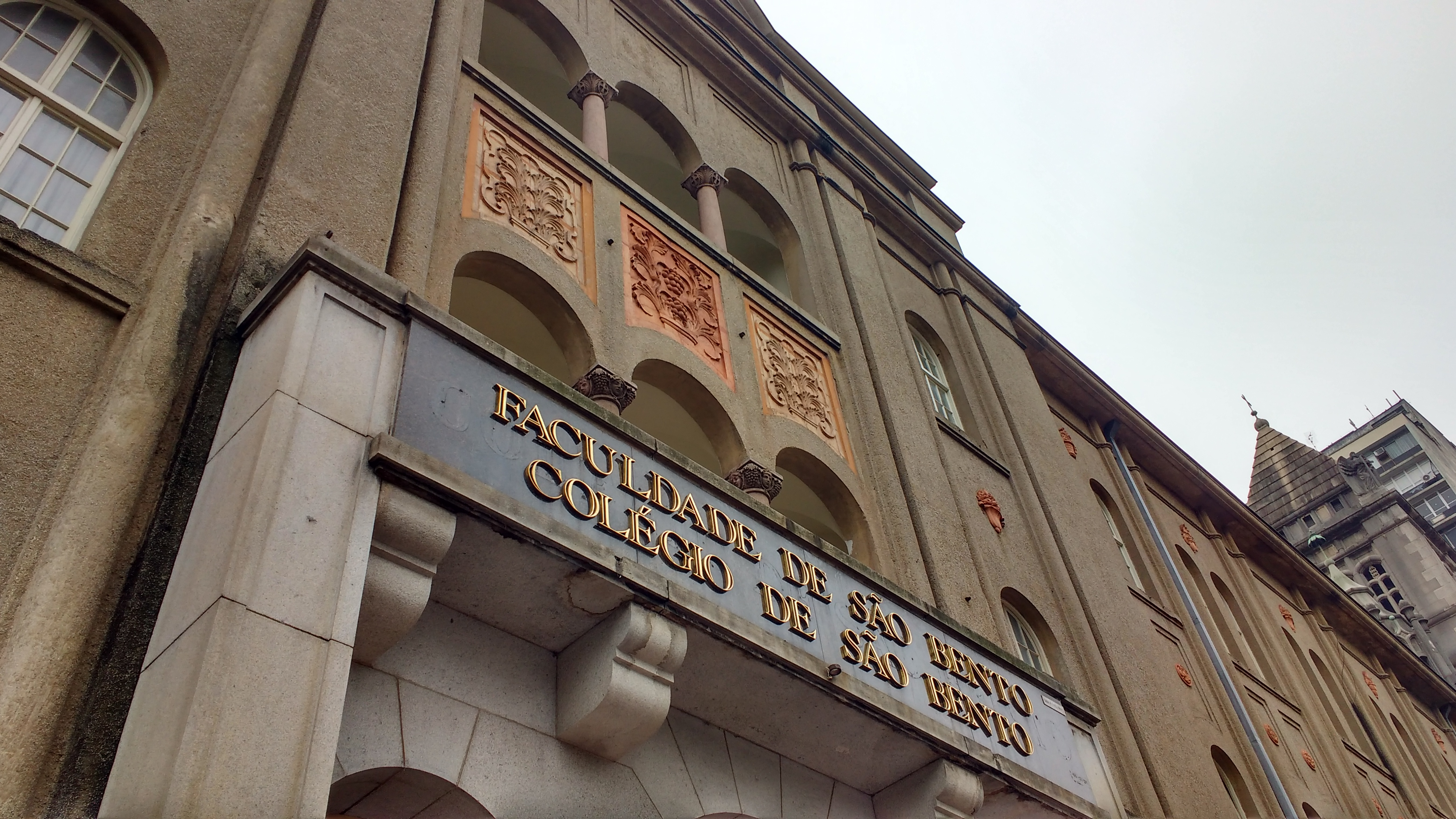
Facade of São Bento College.

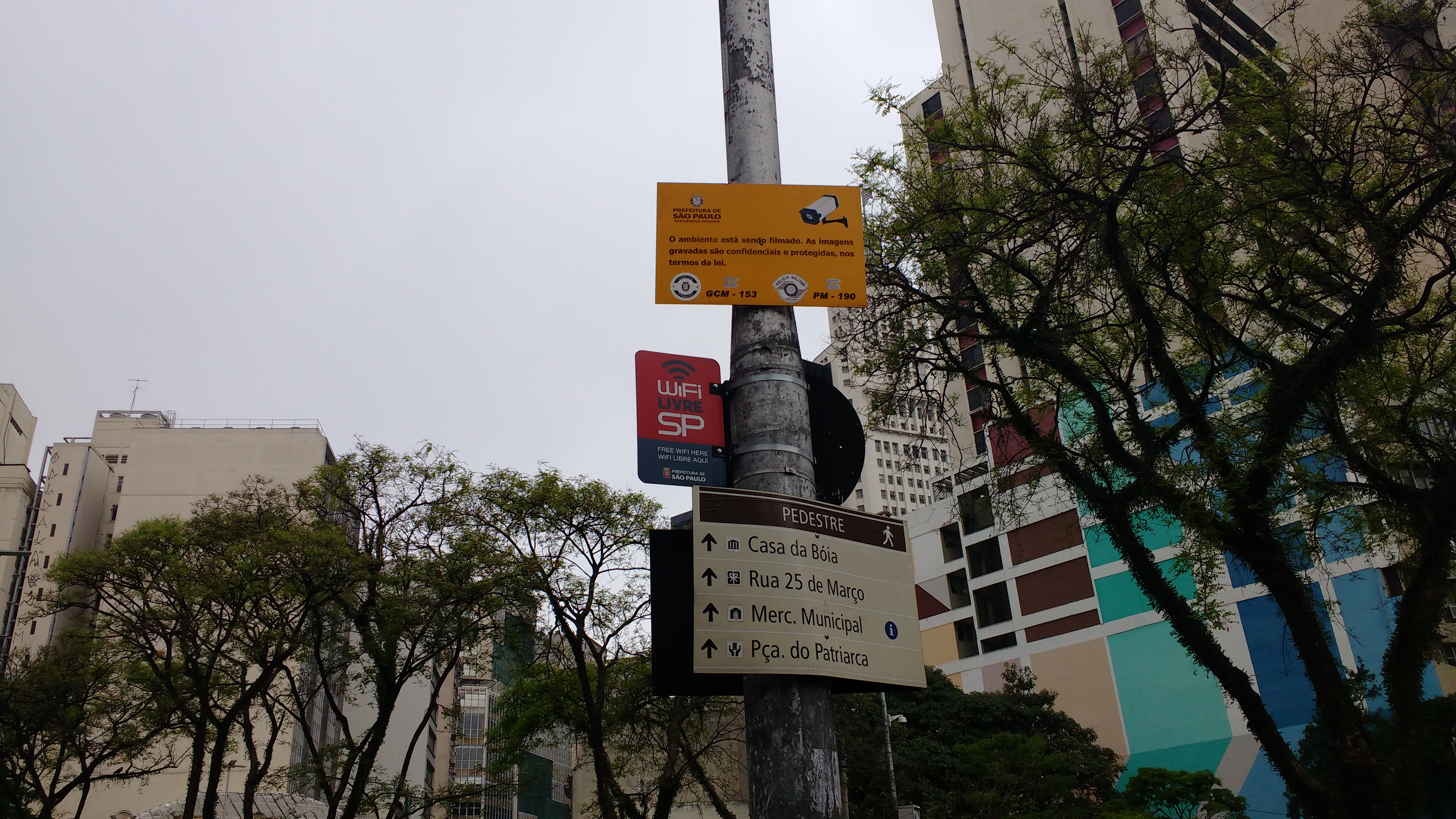
Free Wi-Fi card in the space.

== See also ==
- Central Zone of São Paulo
- Historic Center of São Paulo
