= Mosteiro de São Bento (São Paulo) =

Catholic Temple in São Paulo, Brazil

Monastery of Saint Benedict
- Mosteiro de São Bento
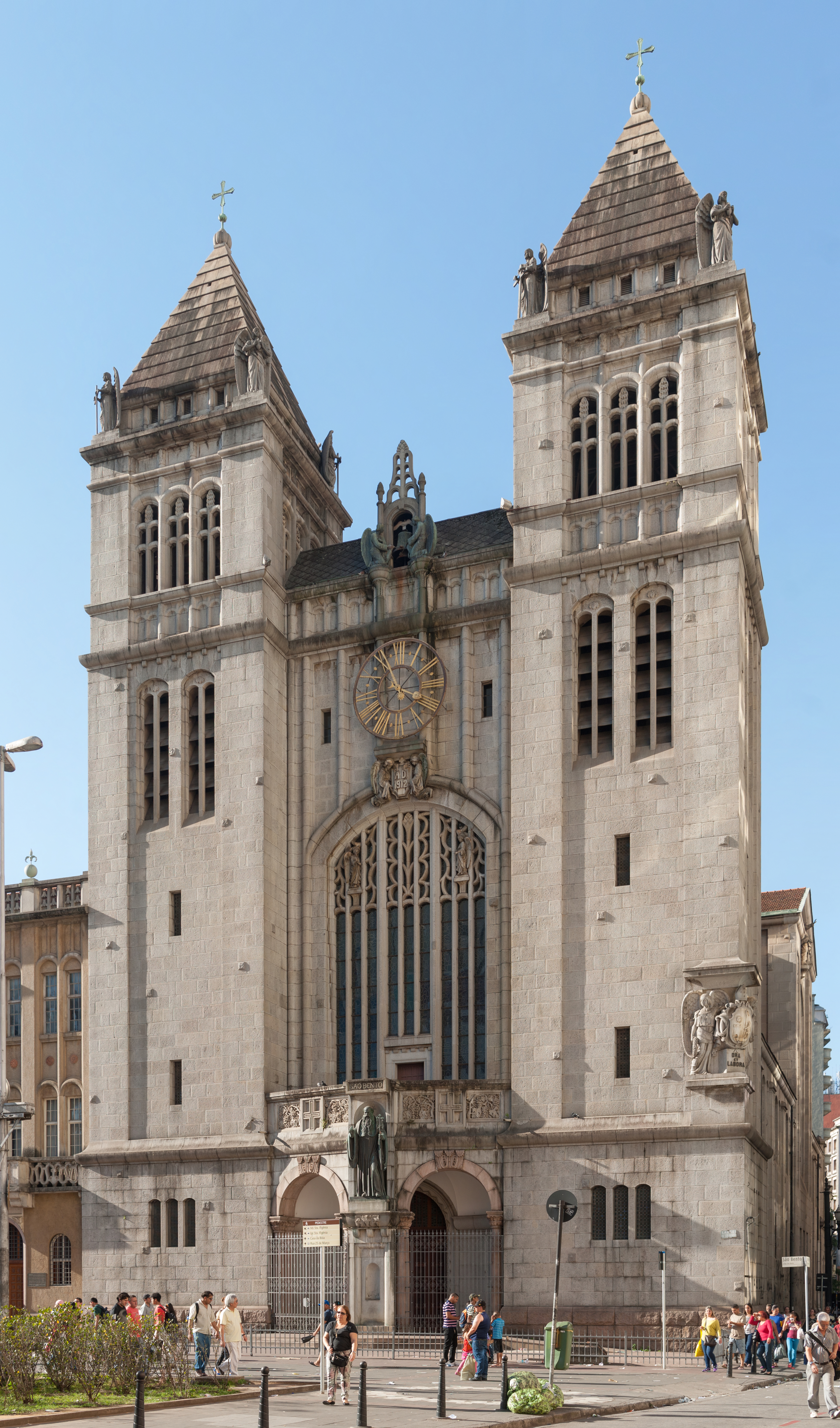
- The facade of the monastery

- Location within São Paulo State

Monastery information
- Order: Order of Saint Benedict
- Established: 14 July 1598
- Diocese: Archdiocese of São Paulo

People
- Abbot: Dom Mathias Tolentino Braga

Architecture
- Architect: Richard Berndl
- Style: Neo-Romanesque
- Groundbreaking: 1910
- Completed date: 1922

Site
- Location: Largo São Bento, São Paulo, Brazil
- Coordinates: 23°32′37″S 46°38′02″W
- Website: www.mosteirodesaobentosp.com.br

Monastery of Saint Benedict (Portuguese: Mosteiro de São Bento) is a Catholic temple located in São Paulo, Brazil. Established on 14 July 1598, the current church was built between 1910 and 1914 by the German architect Richard Berndl. It is formed by the Basilica of Our Lady of the Assumption, the College of São Bento and the School of Philosophy of São Bento.

Currently, around 45 monks reside in the monastery, where they dedicate their lives to the ora et labora tradition. The Basilica of Our Lady of the Assumption contains a choir for the Divine Office in the monastic rite, celebrated daily by the monks, and Mass in the Roman rite, both with Gregorian chant. In May 2007, the monastery hosted Pope Benedict XVI on his first visit to Brazil.

== History ==
The foundation of the Monastery of Saint Benedict dates back to 14 July 1598. According to documents from the time, Captain-Major Jorge Correia granted two sesmarias, which would become the basis for the Benedictine temple. The land granted was located between the rivers Anhangabaú and Tamanduateí, stretching on one side to the Anhangabaú Valley and on the other to the current 25 de Março.

The monastery was founded by Friar Dom Mauro Teixeira, a disciple of Father Joseph of Anchieta who met the cacique Tibiriçá and built a church in homage to Saint Benedict in the same location as his house. On April 15, 1600, the City Council officials validated the letter of sesmaria to Friar Mauro Teixeira.

In 1634, the work was completed. Initially, the chapel was dedicated to Saint Benedict. Afterwards, at the request of the governor of the Captaincy of São Vicente, Francisco de Sousa, the patron saint changed to Our Lady of Montserrat and, in 1720, to Our Lady of the Assumption.

In 1641, after the end of the Iberian Union, John IV, then Duke of Braganza, was crowned King of Portugal. In São Paulo, a group of largely Castilian settlers wanted to prevent the captaincy from recognizing the new king and offered Amador Bueno the title of King of São Paulo. He declined the offer and retreated to the Monastery of Saint Benedict to protect himself from the popular fury. With the help of the monks, tensions cooled and John IV was recognized by the people of São Paulo as the new King of Portugal.

In 1650, the structure of the monastery underwent a renovation sponsored by the bandeirante Fernão Dias Pais, known as the "emerald hunter". Gratefully, the monks awarded him the privilege of being buried in the chancel of the monastery church, along with his relatives and descendants; his remains still rest in the central nave of the temple. The clay sculptures of St. Benedict and St. Scholastica, made by Friar Agostinho de Jesus and displayed on the main altar of the church, date from the same period.

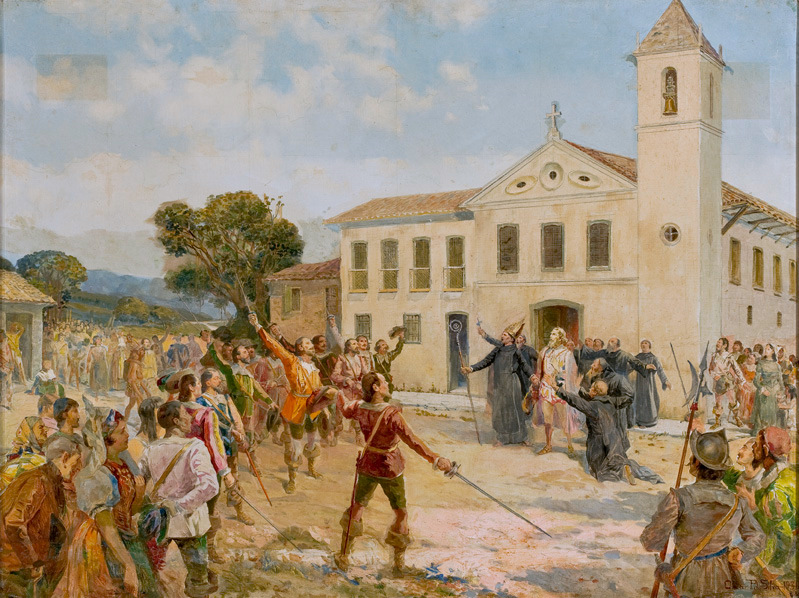
Acclamation of Amador Bueno.

In the first half of the 19th century, a law passed by the imperial government ordered the extinction of novitiates in Brazil, which prevented the entry of new monks and caused the monastic community to become almost extinct. The collapse caused by the act led to plans to transfer the monastery to the public treasury. Abbot Dom Miguel Kruse, a German religious, renovated the monastery and reversed the situation. In 1903, Kruse founded the College of São Bento (Colégio de São Bento) for secondary education and in 1908 he created the School of Philosophy (Faculdade de Filosofia).

The colonial church and monastery were demolished on Kruse's initiative to build a more modern building. The current temple, designed to match the city's urbanization process, was erected between 1910 and 1922 according to a design by architect Richard Berndl, a former professor at the Ludwig-Maximilians-Universität München (LMU Munich), and decorated by Benedictine Adalbert Gressnigt.

== Architectural features ==
Overall, the building follows the Neo-Romanesque style. Most of the interior decoration was planned and executed by the monk Adelbert Gresnicht, a Dutchman who arrived in Brazil in 1913. Gresnicht came from Maredsous Abbey in Belgium and was a follower of the Beuron school, a Benedictine institution that influenced artists such as Gustav Klimt. The Beuron school applied the aesthetic theory for religious art developed by the architect and sculptor Desiderius Lenz, a graduate of the Munich Art School, along with the Benedictine church painter Gabriel Wüger and Abbot Maurus Wolter. The theory sought, within ancient art, an artistic process that allowed contact between the faithful and God. Lenz believed that the ancient peoples acquired this knowledge and used it in their temples based on a mathematical principle.

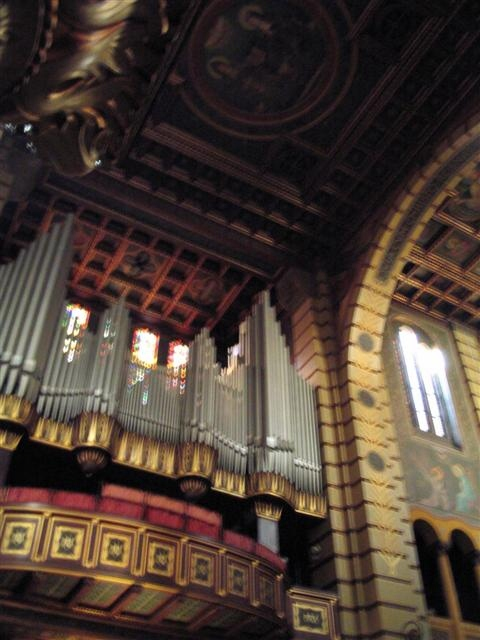
Church organ.

Some of the medallions on the walls of the side naves were painted by Thomaz Scheuchl, a German painter. The sculptures of the 12 apostles in the nave were made between 1919 and 1922 by the Belgian sculptor and painter Adrien Henri Vital van Emelen, from the School of Arts and Crafts. The sculpture ensemble located on a beam above the chancel by Anton Lang dates from 1921. The high altar is made of marble from the Lake Maggiore region in Italy. Gressnicht also designed the Basilica's stained glass windows: The Evangelists at the entrance, the death of Saint Benedict in the monks' choir in the transept and Our Lady of the Assumption on the high altar.

The images of St. Benedict and St. Scholastica on the high altar by Friar Agostinho de Jesus, the first Brazilian sculptor who lived in the monastery in the 17th century, a Crucified Christ sculpted by José Pereira Mutas from São Paulo in 1777 and the image of Our Lady of the Conception from the 18th century are the remains of the old church in the current basilica.

=== Clock and organ ===
The clock at the Monastery of Saint Benedict was made in Germany and installed in 1921. It was regarded as the most accurate clock in São Paulo until the advent of quartz crystal clocks. It features a carillon with six tuned bells that chime the full and fractional hours. The church organ dates from 1954 and is also German. It was produced by the Walcker factory and has over 6,000 pipes. It stands on the left side of the transept of the monastery church, supported by two large columns carved from oak created by Heinrich Waderé.

== Conservation and restoration ==
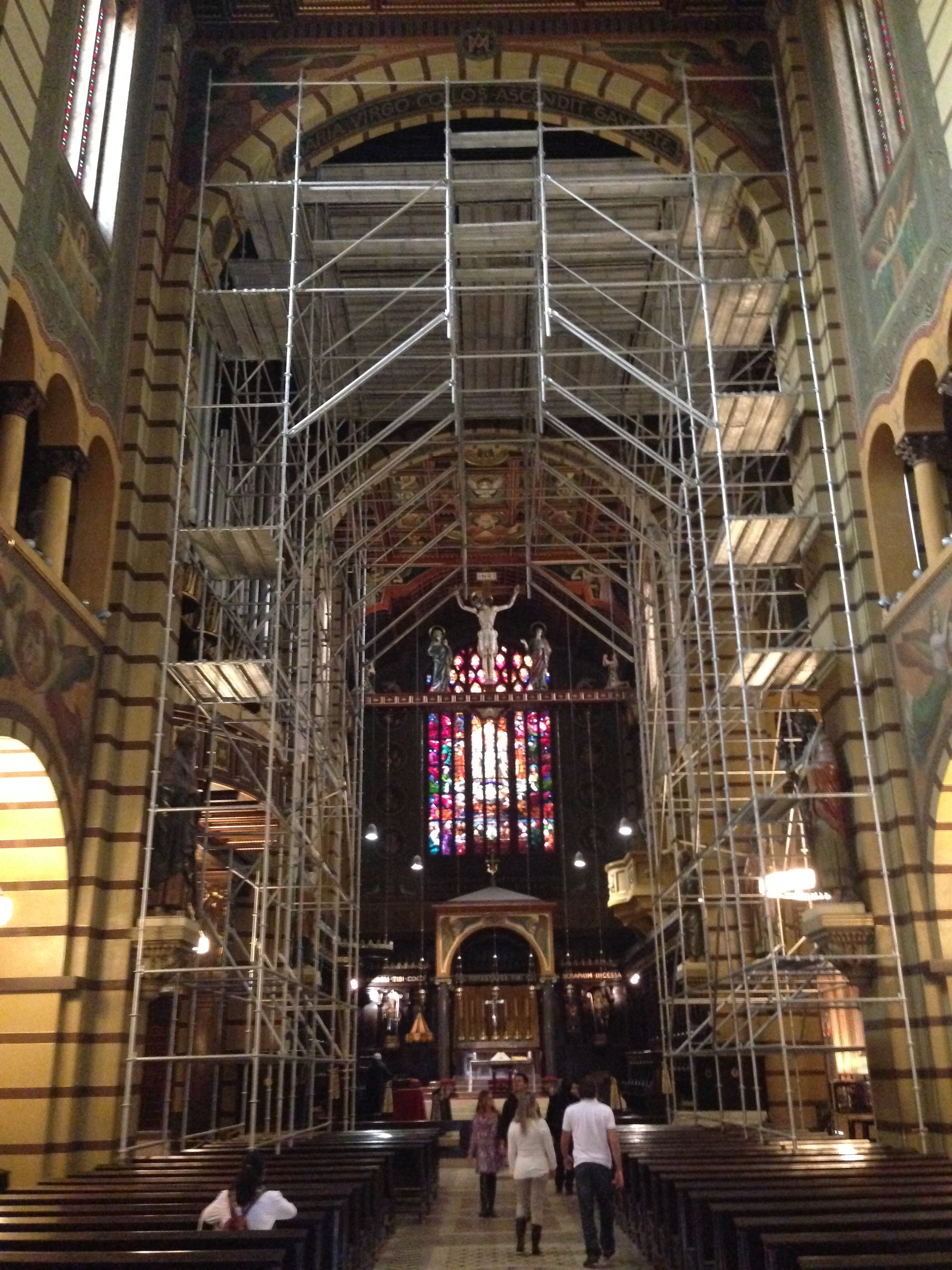
Scaffolding during restoration work on the transept.

In 2006, the Monastery of Saint Benedict underwent restoration work to accommodate Pope Benedict XVI during his visit to Brazil. At the time, the most intensive work occurred in the school chapel, inaugurated in 1937 and closed for 20 years due to leaks, which destroyed a large part of the mural paintings by the monk Thomaz Scheuchl. The wooden ceiling, carved with stars, was cleaned and the faces and silhouettes of biblical characters were partly recreated. Four murals narrating the Parable of the Prodigal Son, florets with musical angels and 14 altar paintings have been restored.

Between 2011 and 2013, the 12 images of the apostles, the chapel of the Blessed Sacrament, the side chapels and the organ with 6,000 pipes, which was installed in 1954 during the celebrations of São Paulo's fourth centenary, were restored. The six panels in the chancel depicting scenes from the life of Mary, the sacred sculptures and the images of St. Benedict and St. Scholastica, sculpted in 1650 by Agostinho de Jesus, were also restored. In 2016, the Crucified Christ, made of cedar by José Pereira Mutas in 1777, was restored after being damaged by pollution and grease from people's hands. The wall where the sculpture is located was also recovered.

== College and School of São Bento ==
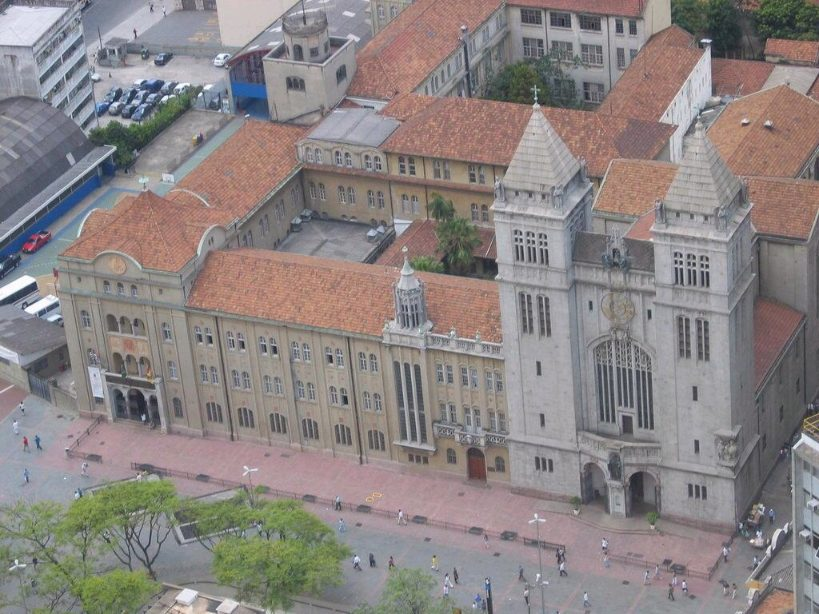
The basilica, the monastery in the center and the college on the left.

Founded in 1903 as the Gymnasium of São Bento (Gymnasio de São Bento), the school was the initiative of Abbot Dom Miguel Kruse. The inauguration occurred on St. Benedict's Day, 21 March, and the first school year began on 15 February 1903. From 1906 onwards, it housed a boarding school and, in 1908, it shared space with the School of Philosophy. In 1943, it was renamed College of São Bento. Since the 1970s, it has also provided education for girls.

In 1908, the Faculty of Philosophy, Sciences and Letters, the first free faculty of philosophy in Brazil, was founded. At first, it had an affiliation with the University of Louvain in Belgium. In 1940, after the creation of national legislation for higher education, the faculty's programs were recognized by the Ministry of Education (Ministério da Educação - MEC). In 1946, at the request of the Archdiocese of São Paulo, the school joined the original nucleus of the Pontifical Catholic University of São Paulo (Pontifícia Universidade Católica de São Paulo - PUC), but philosophy courses remained within the monastery. In 1999, the monastery asked the MEC to authorize the implementation of the Academic degree in Philosophy, which was approved in December 2001. The Bachelor's degree in Philosophy gained authorization on October 23, 2013 and began its activities in February 2014.

== Related services ==
In 1999, the Monastery of Saint Benedict started selling cakes, breads, jams and cookies, whose recipes were stored for centuries in the abbey's archives. It also houses a library with over 100,000 titles, one of the oldest in the city of São Paulo. The collection contains 581 titles published before the 19th century, including six rare incunabula, the oldest is a New Testament dated 1496. It also contains a collection of tiny manuscripts with spines less than a centimeter long, which contain a biblical passage or a prayer, as well as rare editions of books that were banned by the Catholic Church. Access to the collection is restricted to monks and students, but researchers and scholars can apply for special permission.

== Gallery ==
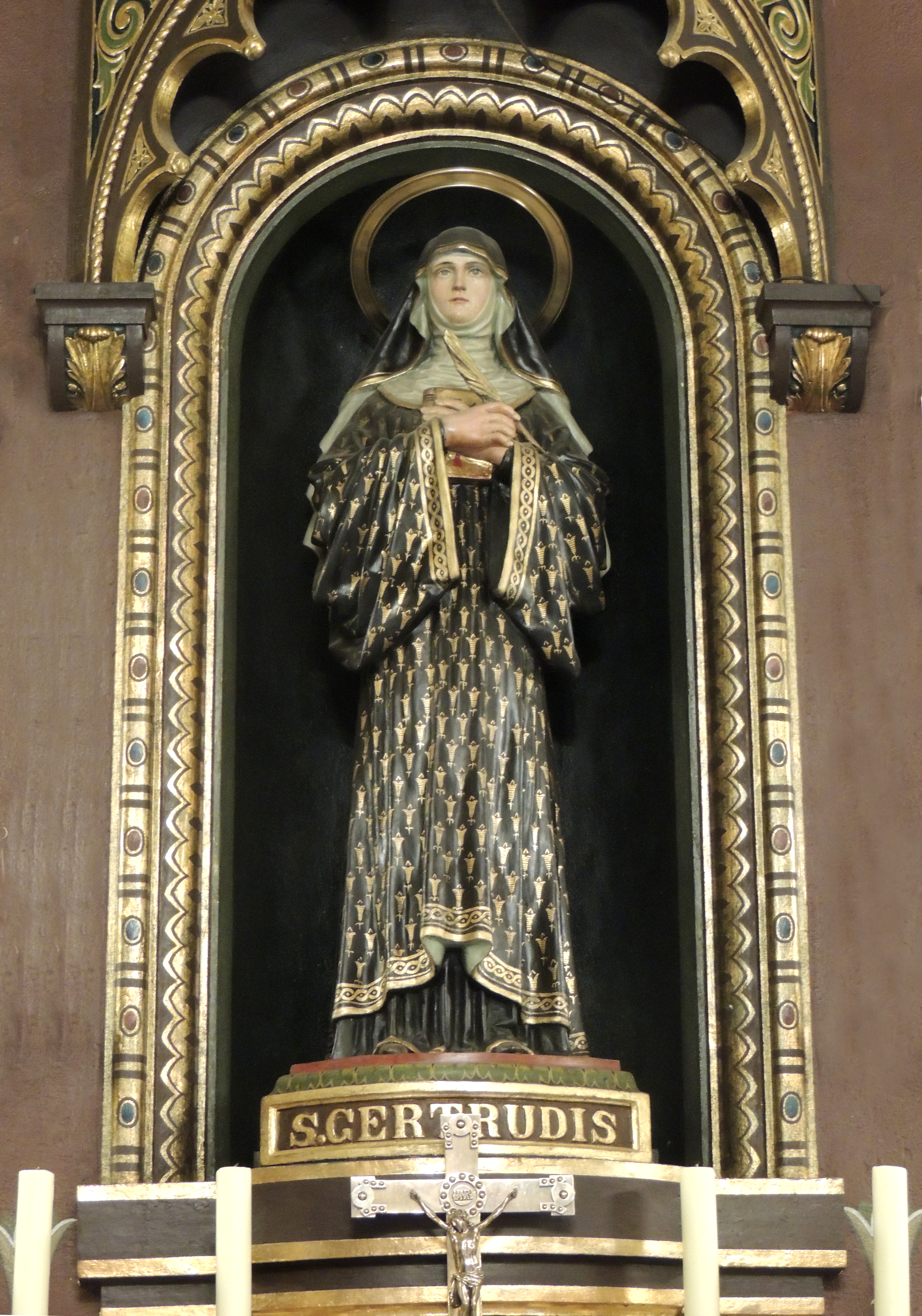
Saint Gertrude

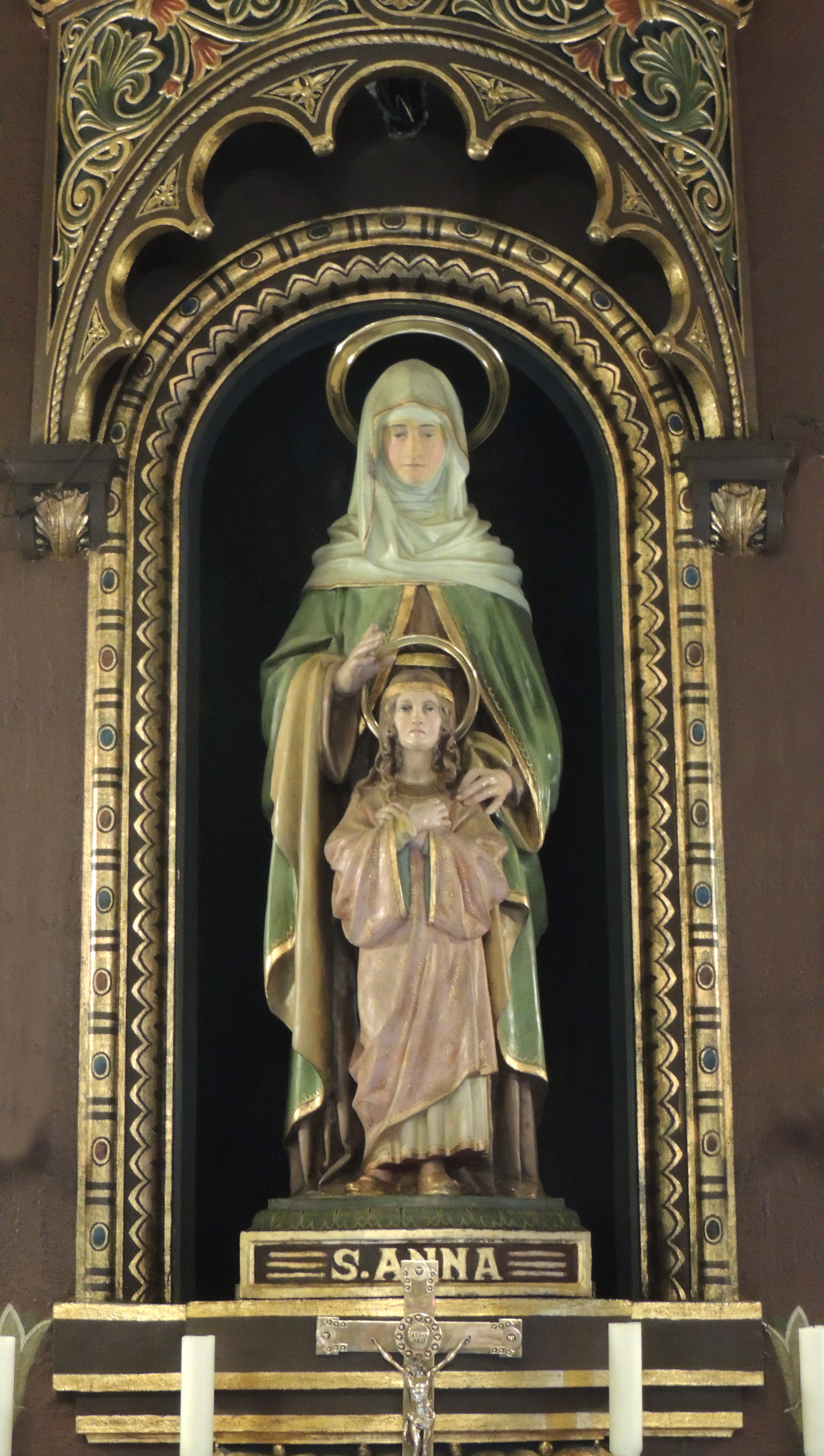
Saint Anne

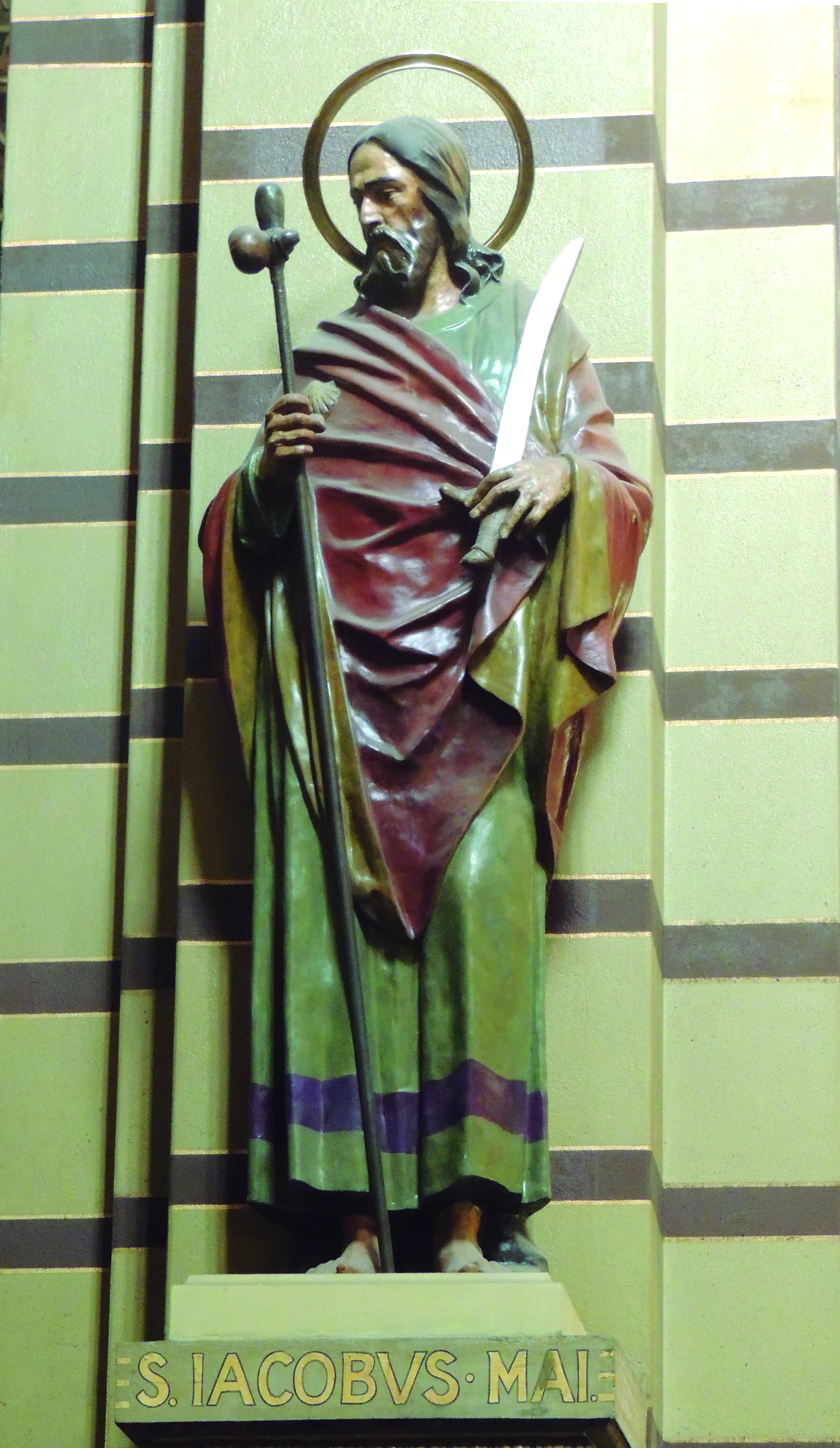
James the Great

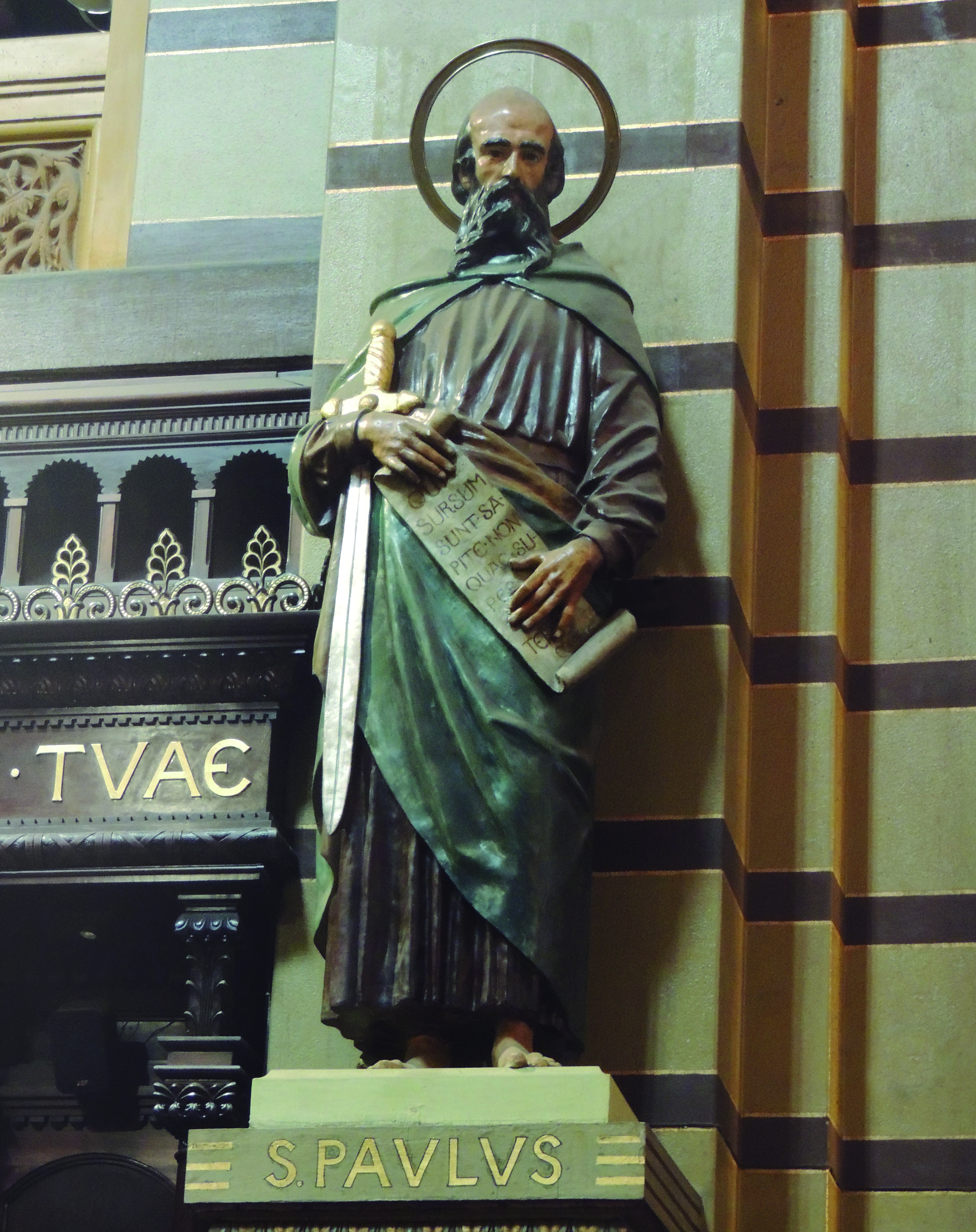
Saint Paul

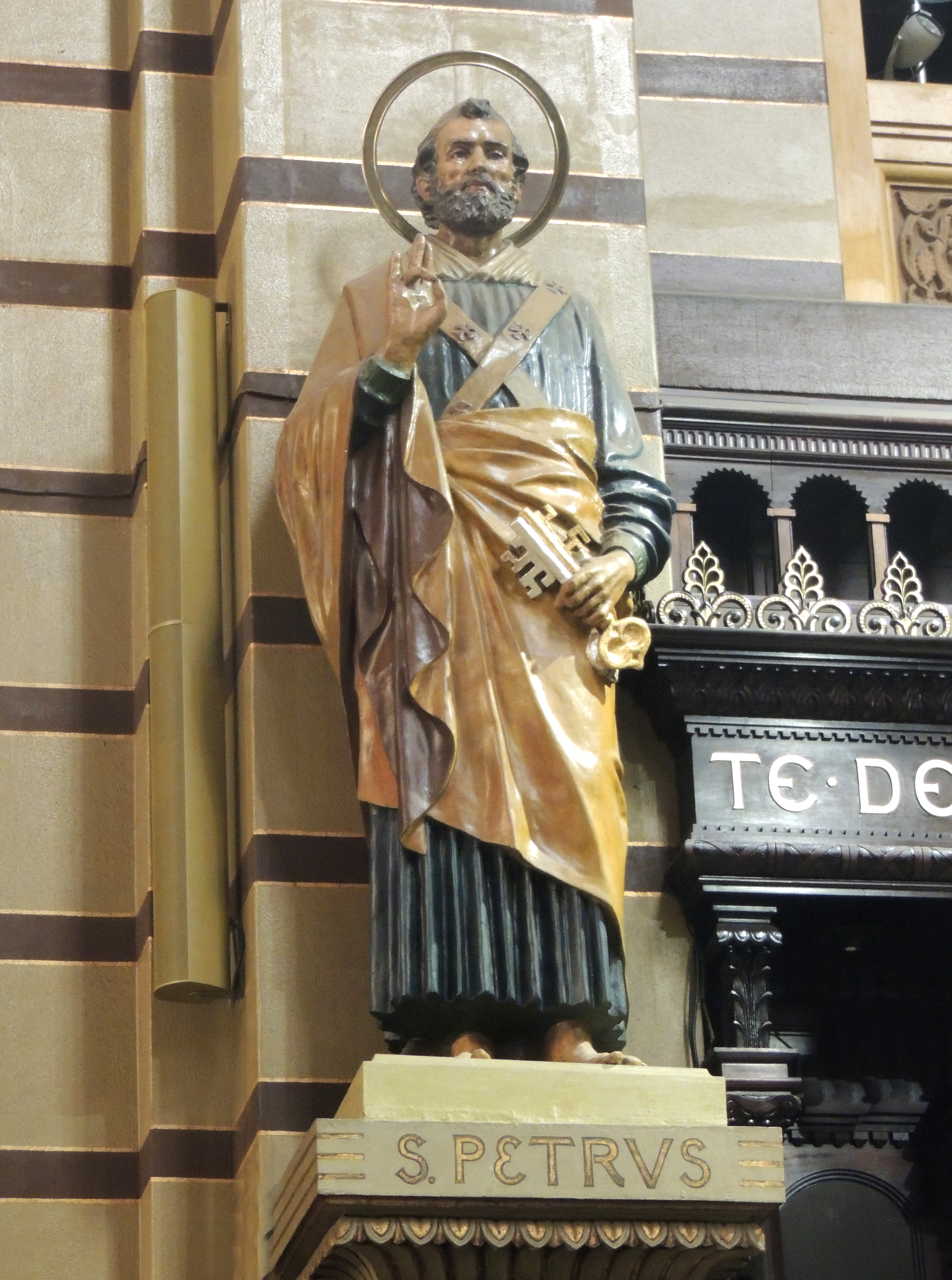
Saint Peter

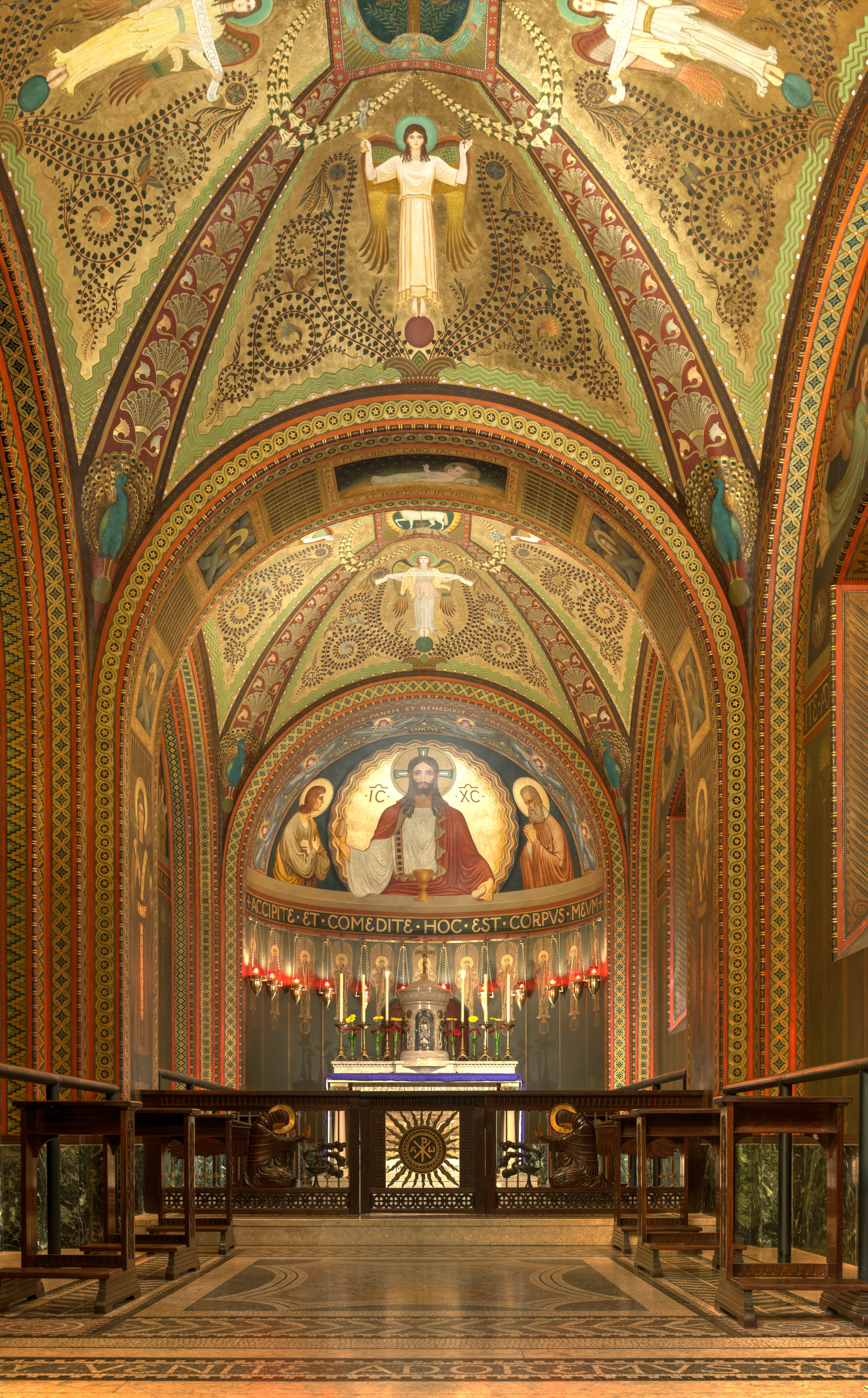
Inside the church

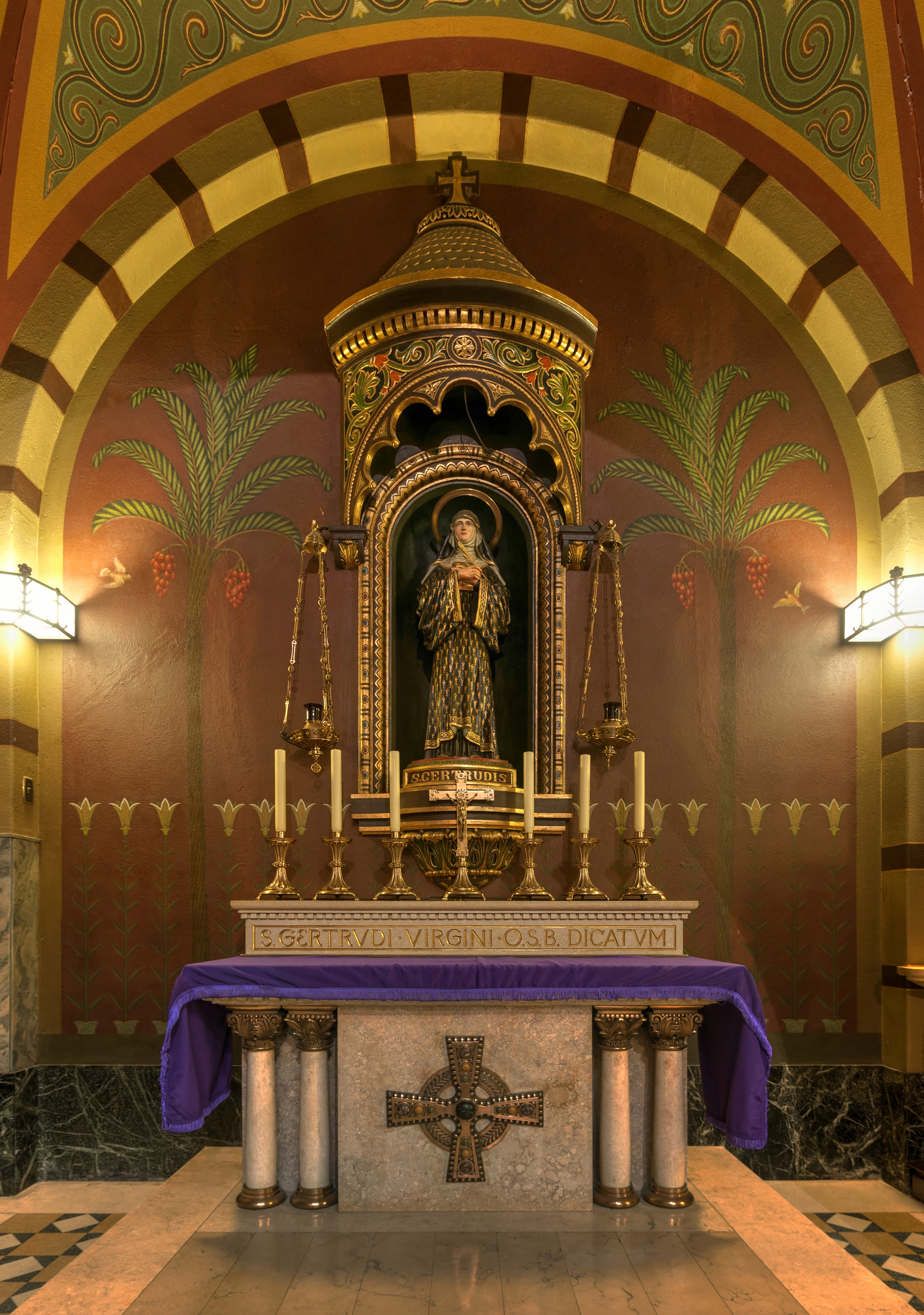
Inside the church

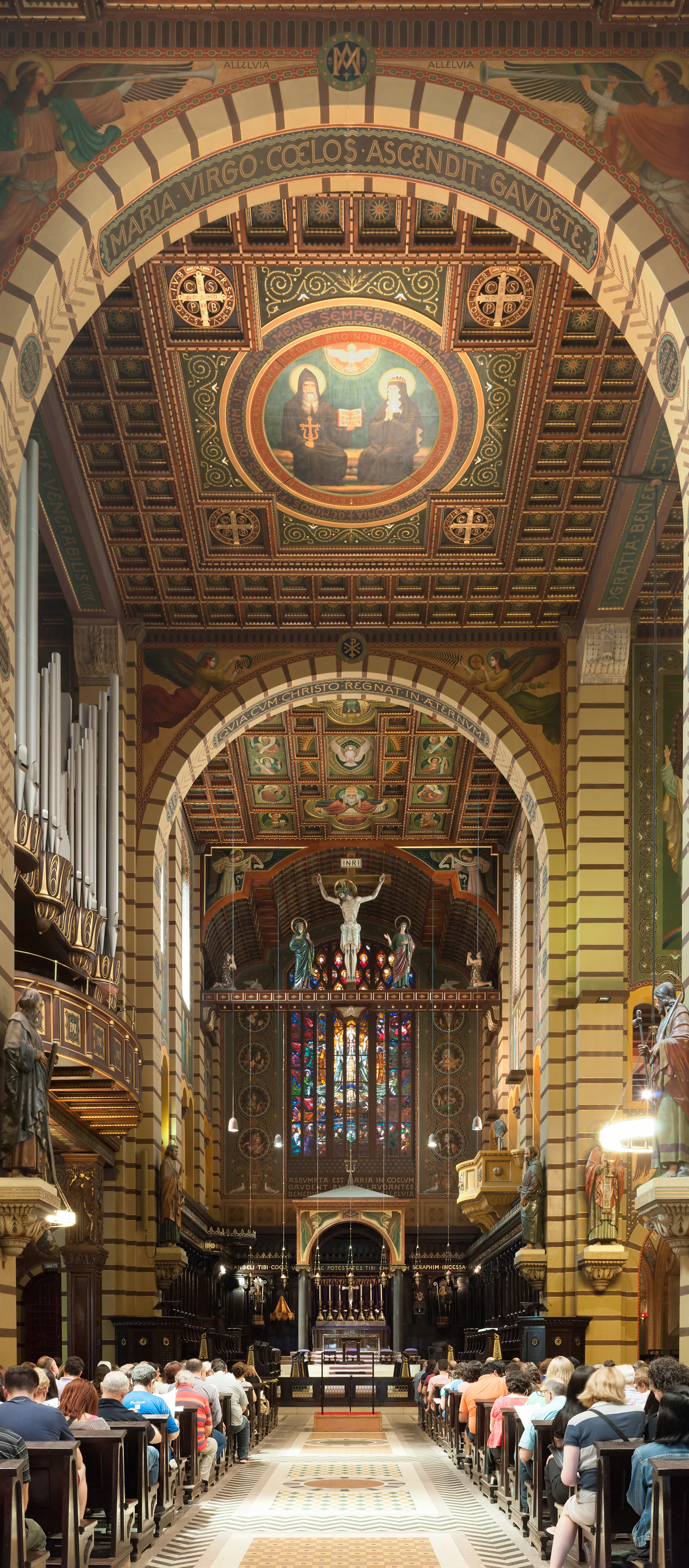
Inside the church

== See also ==
- Largo São Bento
- Tourism in the city of São Paulo
