= Rua 25 de Março =

Street in São Paulo, Brazil

25 de Março Street
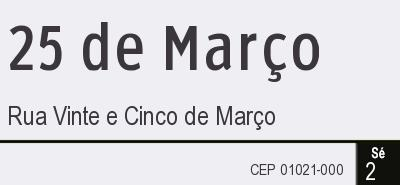

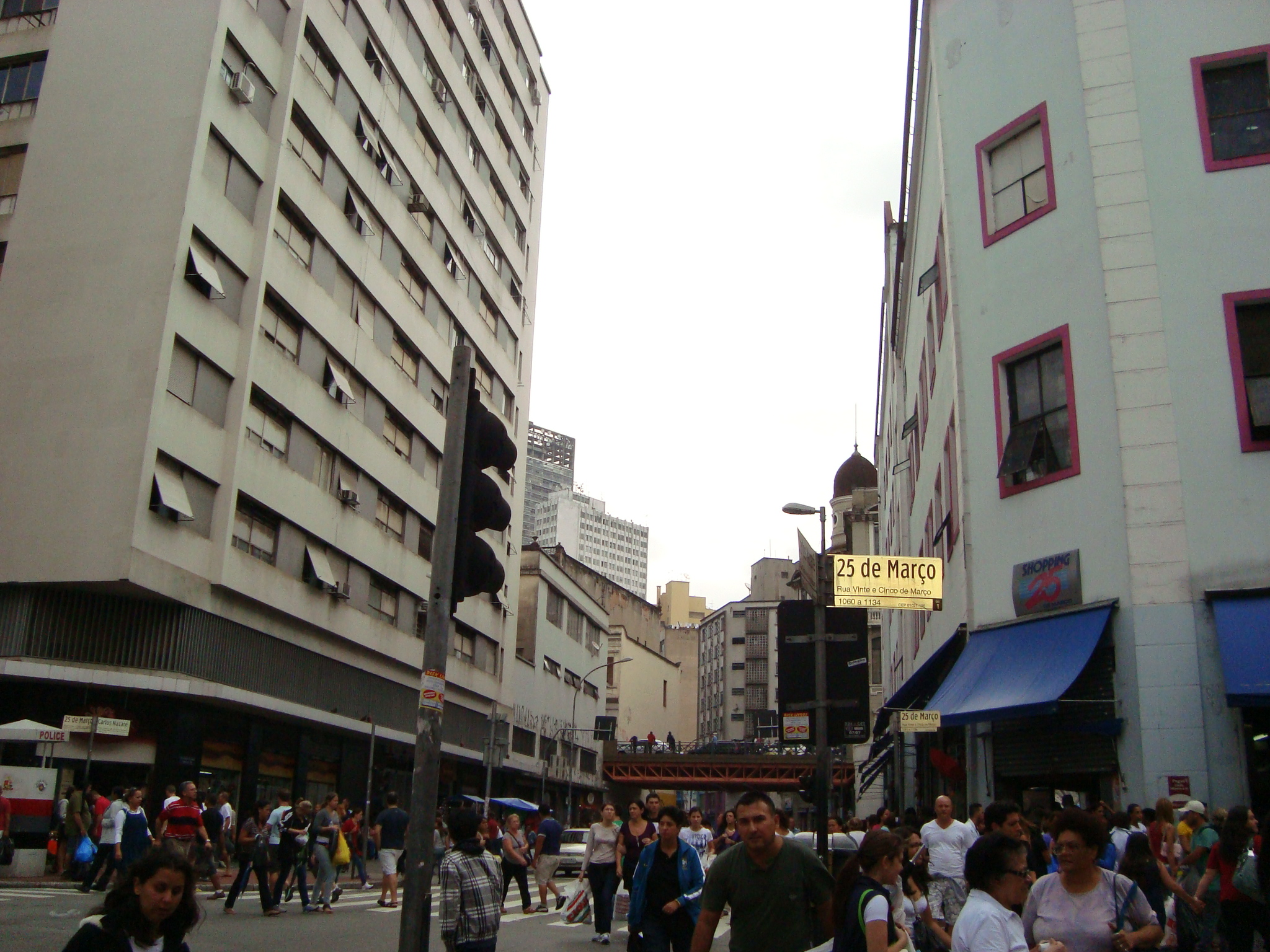
- Rua 25 de Março from above
- Interactive map of 25 de Março Street
- Native name: Rua 25 de Março (Portuguese)
- Former name: Rua de Baixo
- Location: Subprefecture of Sé, São Paulo
- Postal code: 01021-000, 01021-100, 01021-200
- Nearest metro station: São Bento
- Coordinates: 23°32′39″S 46°37′57″W
- South end: Avenida Rangel Pestana
- North end: Rua Paula Souza

Construction
- Inauguration: 1865

Other
- Known for: Variety stores, wholesale retailers, counterfeit consumer goods, crowds
- Website: 25 de março Já

Rua 25 de Março or Rua Vinte e Cinco de Março (transl. March 25th Street – transl. March Twenty-fifth Street) is a popular shopping street in the central zone of São Paulo, Brazil. The district surrounding Rua 25 de Março has long been synonymous in Brazil with large crowds and discount shopping.

== History ==
Much of the area that is Rua 25 de Março today was originally part of the Tamanduateí River. A series of river engineering projects in the late nineteenth and earlier twentieth centuries realigned the Tamanduateí and Anhangabaú rivers, moving the river and the port further to the east. The old port, Porto Geral, lends its name to one of the major cross streets of 25 de Março, Ladeira Porto Geral. The original street name, "Rua de Baixo", refers to the low (baixo) position of the land in comparison with the streets uphill to the west. In 1865 the name change was changed to commemorate the date of Brazil's first constitution, signed on 25 March 1824.

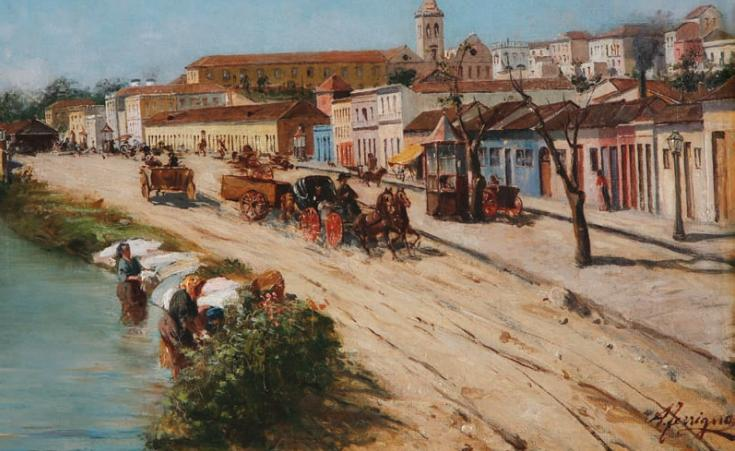
Painting Rua 25 de Março, circa 1894 by Antonio Ferrigno

Waves of Middle Eastern immigrants arrived at the port and settled in the area during the latter half of the nineteenth century. In 1887 Lebanese immigrant Benjamin Jafet opened the first store on Rua 25 de Março. Other merchants began opening their own shops and the area grew. During the 1960s the area suffered with frequent flooding, which damaged the merchandise. The resulting necessity to sell large quantities of inventory quickly and at deep discounts established Rua 25 de Março's reputation as a center for wholesale pricing.

By the 1980s other immigrant communities from Korea, China, Greece, and Portugal began to open up shops on 25 de Março and neighboring streets. The commercial activity in the area had expanded to include more than wholesale shops by the end of the twentieth century.

== Present day ==
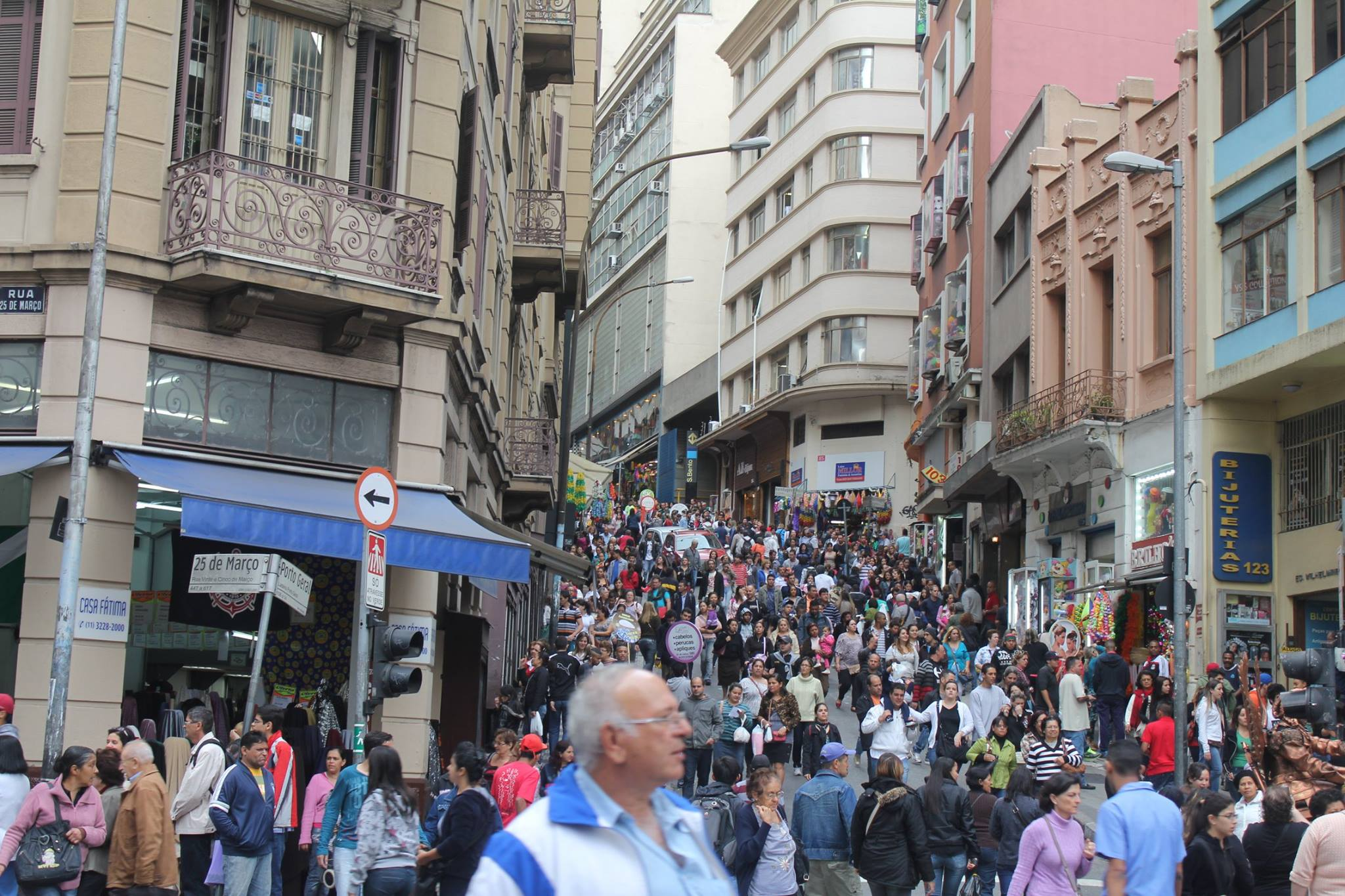
Shopping area near Rua 25 de Março

The area between the São Bento Monastery and the Municipal Market along Ladeira Porto Geral, as well as the street itself and other smaller side streets is commonly referred to by locals as Rua 25 de Março.

There are three main shopping malls in the area: The Shopping 25 de Março (25th of March Mall), Shopping Oriental (Oriental Mall) and the most famous Galeria Pagé (Pagé Gallery) and at the streets you can find a lot of stores with a miscellaneous kind of products, including tennis shoes, toys, packaging, jewelry, bags, and stationery. Most of these stores sells only in bulk and low prices, so many stores owners from far districts or other cities come to this place to buy goods for resale. Also end user consumer can buy goods, but at higher prices.

== Crime ==
Brazil taxes on electronics are high, but these items can be found on 25 de Março for relatively low prices. However, the area has been subject to raids by the police for tax irregularities and counterfeit goods.

Every year, Federal Police and Brazilian Customs make arrests in the 25 de Março area, especially the Galeria Page and Shopping 25 de Março. They confiscate smuggled or unauthorized products and close the stores who are selling these products.

Violence, fatalities and serious crime are rare in the district. However, pickpocketing is frequent due to the large crowds of shoppers that come to the area.
