= Beco do Pinto =

Building in São Paulo, Brazil

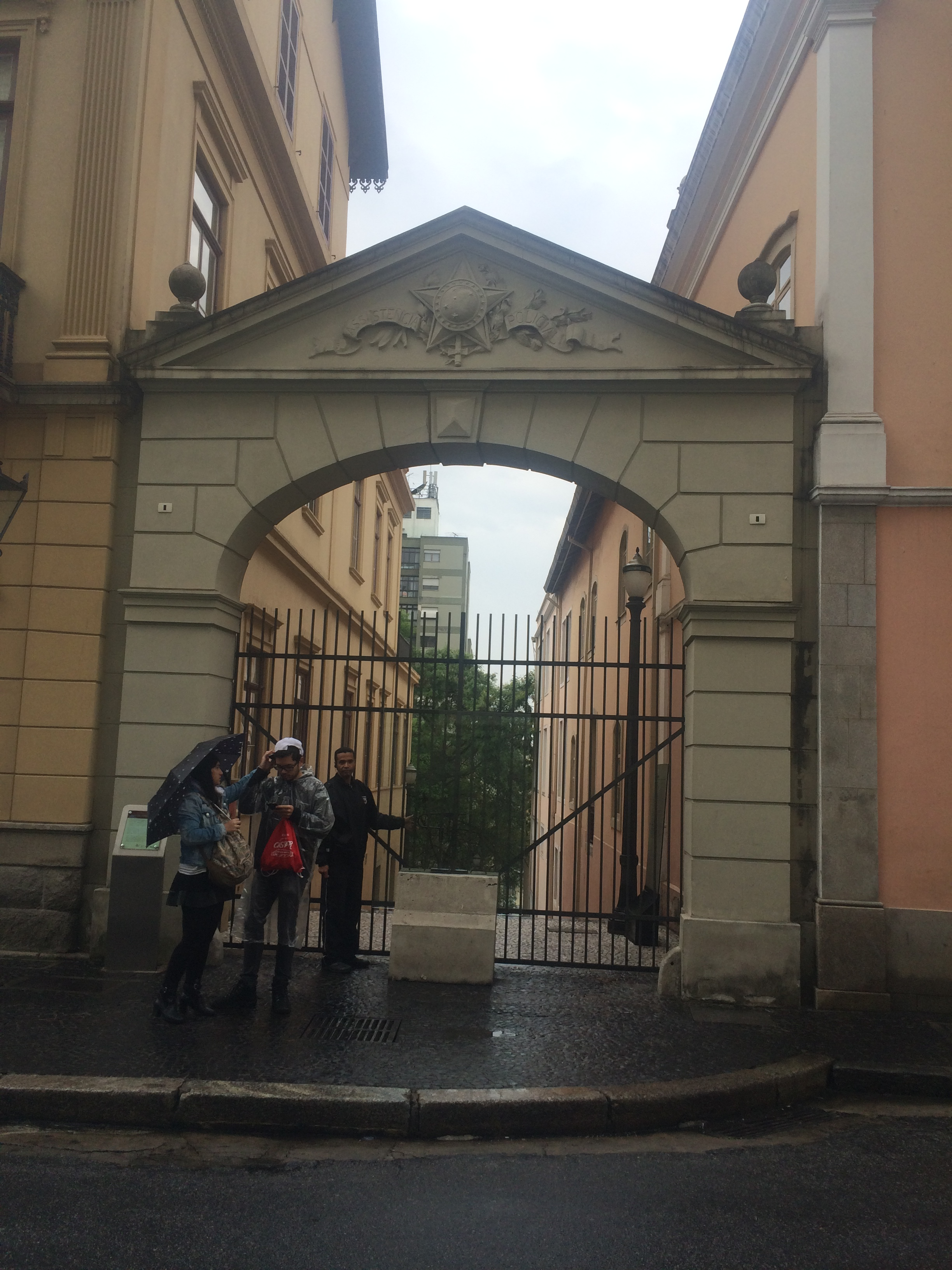
Front view from Beco do Pinto

The Beco do Pinto, also known as Beco do Colégio, is a passage located between the Casa Número Um and Solar da Marquesa de Santos in the center of São Paulo. It links the streets Roberto Simonsen and Bitterncourt Rodrigues. In Brazil's colonial times, it had the function of allowing the transit of people and animals between the Largo da Sé and the meadow of the Tamanduateí River. Today, under the administration of Casa da Imagem (also known as Casa Número Um), it houses projects developed for the space by contemporary artists. The passage has been integrated as part of the Museu da Cidade de São Paulo.

== History ==
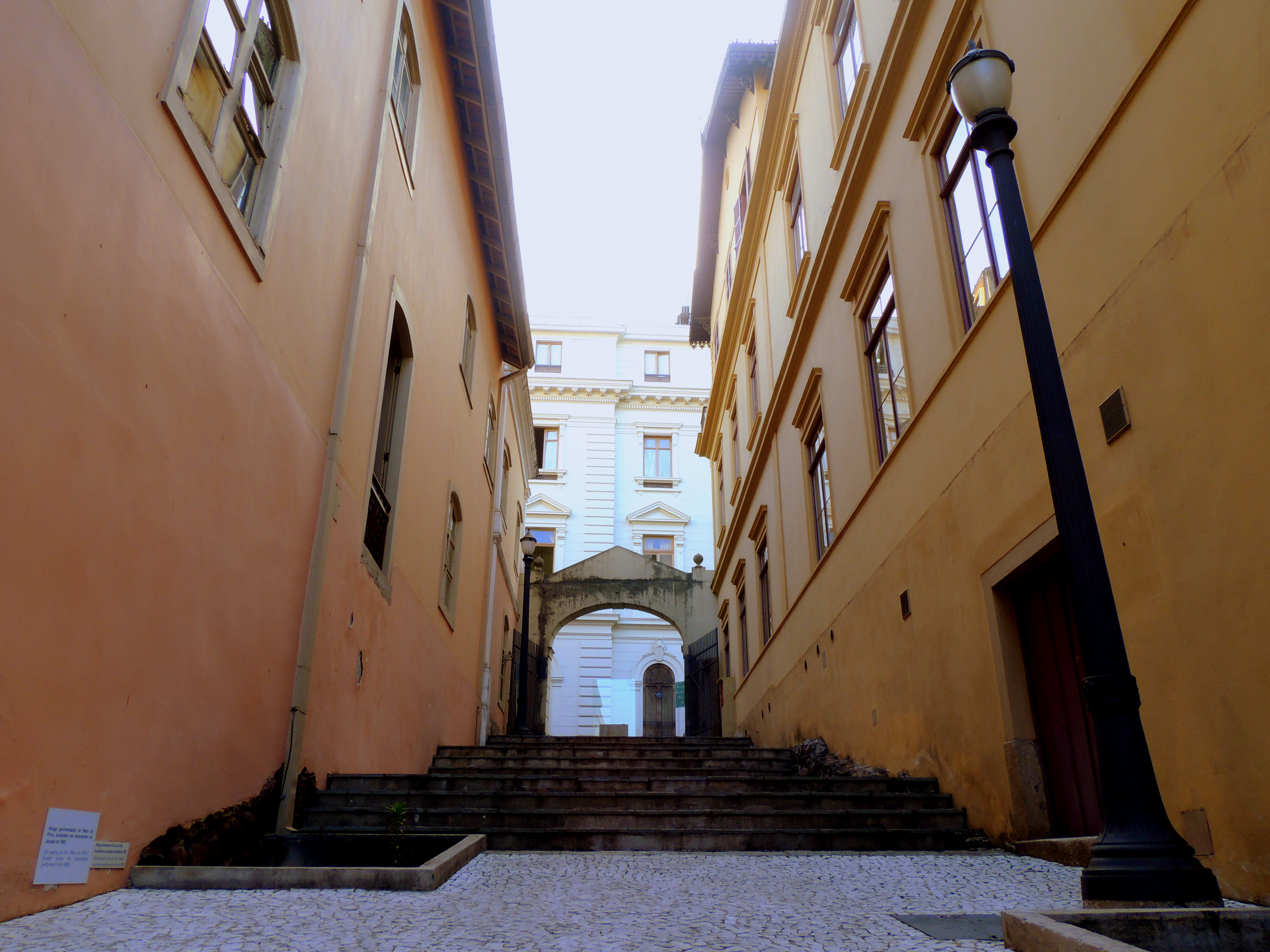
Internal detail from Beco do Pinto

The alley was named after Brigadeiro José Joaquim Pinto de Moraes Leme, owner of the bordering townhouse, whose decisions regarding the passageway were controversial with the City Hall.

In addition to being a way of strategic communication that linked the higher part of the city with the lower part, where there was concentration of the trades of São Paulo, the Beco do Pinto was a path where the slaves went to fetch water and discard domestic waste. Due to being a steep and winding passage, many chose not to go down to the meadow and dumped the trash wherever they went. Troubled by this, in 1821, the Brigadeiro closed the Beco do Pinto with a gate. This change did not last long, however, because the order was contested and forbidden by the City Hall, due to the passageway being a public service.

José Joaquim Pinto's actions were again contested a few years later, this time for having expanded his backyard with the construction of a wall. The change would have affected the insulation from the neighboring house, today the Casa Número Um. The wall was demolished in 1826, and the passage was reopened by the City Hall, receiving the official name of Beco do Colégio.

=== Marquesa de Santos ===
Domitila de Castro Canto e Melo, the Marquesa de Santos, bought the Solar in 1834. Together with the purchase came the requirement from the City Hall that the previously forbidden wall and gate be reconstructed, alleging that there would be no guarantee of security to their property without the usage of such measures. In 1849, the request was once again attended to by the City Hall.

=== Current usage ===
In 1912, after the old street of Carmo was connected to Rangel Pestana Avenue, the Beco lost its function and was put out of commission.

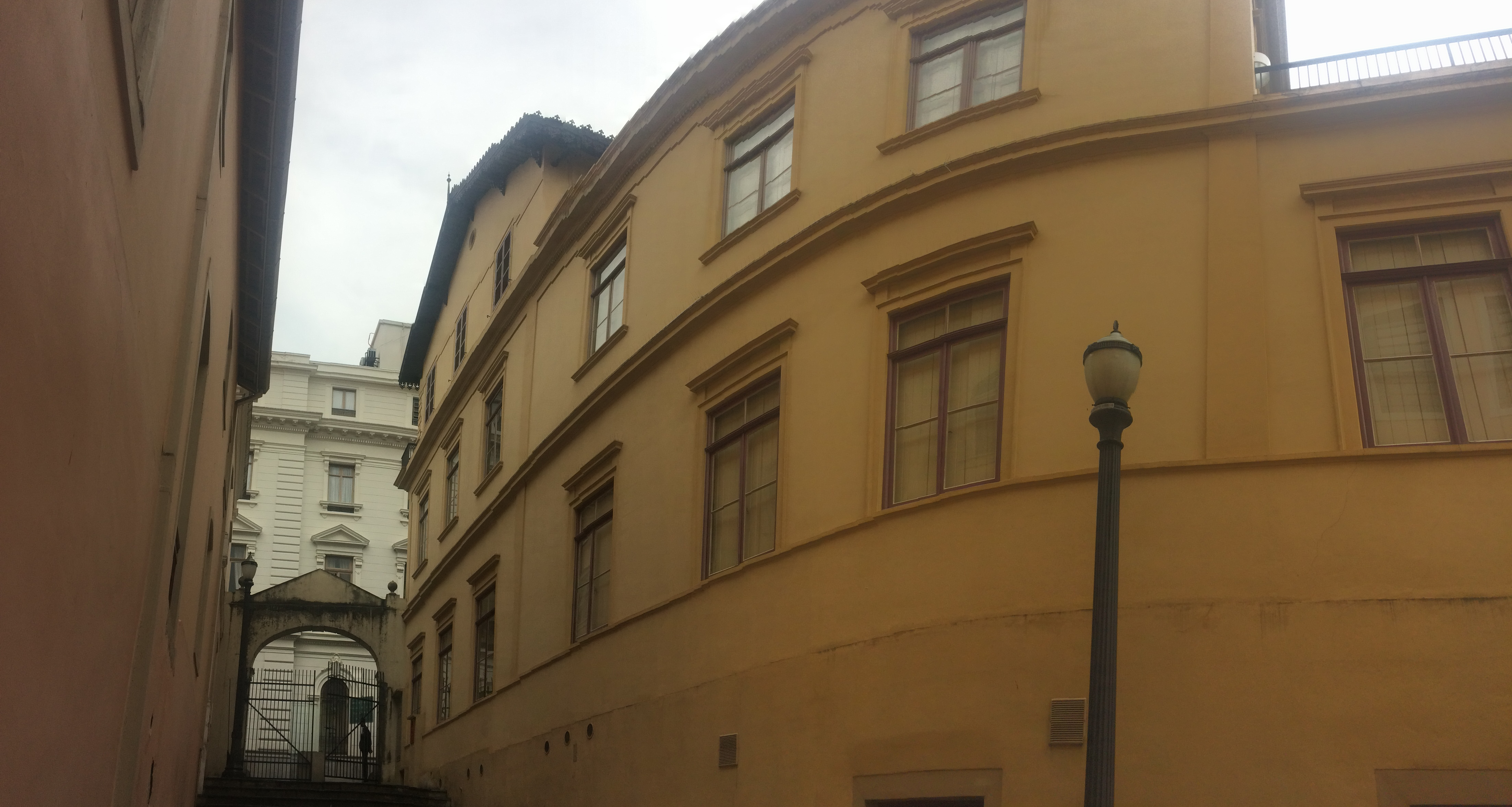
View from the Casa da Imagem from inside the Beco

Currently, the Beco do Pinto is under the responsibility of the Secretaria Municipal de Cultura, and is administered by Casa da Imagem. It integrates with the Museu da Cidade de São Paulo and houses artistic installations produced only for this location. The first installation was made in 2011 by Laura Vinci, with a work that released mists, reflecting on the passage of time.

== Architectural features ==
The Beco do Pinto was constructed originally so that transit was possible between the old street of Carmo – today, Roberto Simonsen Street – and the meadow of Tamanduateí river (near what currently is street Bittencourt Rodrigues), places divided by a large slope.

It is configured architecturally on a staircase permeated by bids, which alternate between flat and inclined. The steps are made of granite and the flat throws are covered with Portuguese stones. The lateral boundaries are defined by the lots of neighbouring buildings, the Casa Número Um (current Casa da Imagem) and the Solar da Marquesa de Santos.

The Beco's entrances are marked by gates with boss and triangular pediments. The gate from the Roberto Simonsen Street presents neoclassic ornaments, aduela, and the coat of arms of Brazil, in low relief. In addition, there are two archaeological showcases that exhibit remnants of historical footwear.

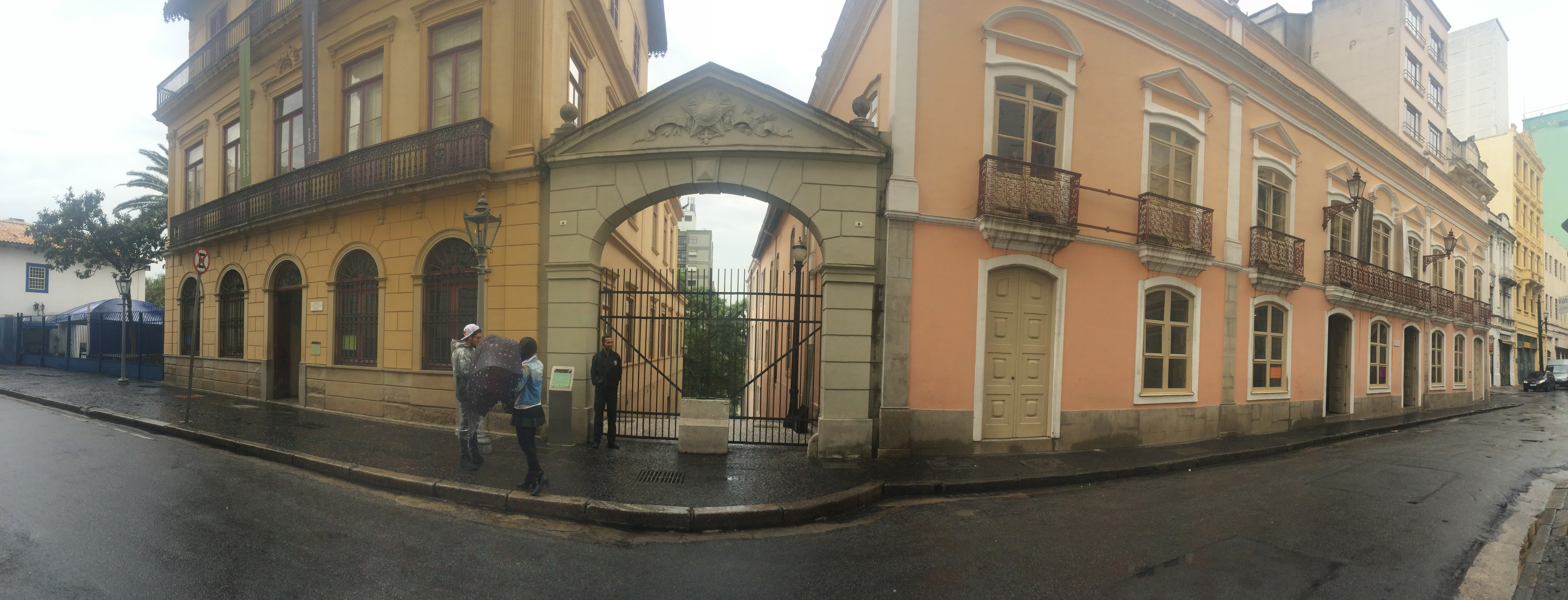
Panoramic view from the street Roberto Simonsen.

== Cultural and historical significance ==
The Beco do Pinto marks the linking between two buildings of exceptional historical value for the city of São Paulo: the Solar da Marquesa de Santos and the Casa Número Um. Beyond that, the passage also represents an important historical mark for having been, during the years of the Brazilian colonial age, the main link between the urban center, concentrated around the Pátio do Colégio, and the Tamanduateí river, located where there was a commercial grouping.

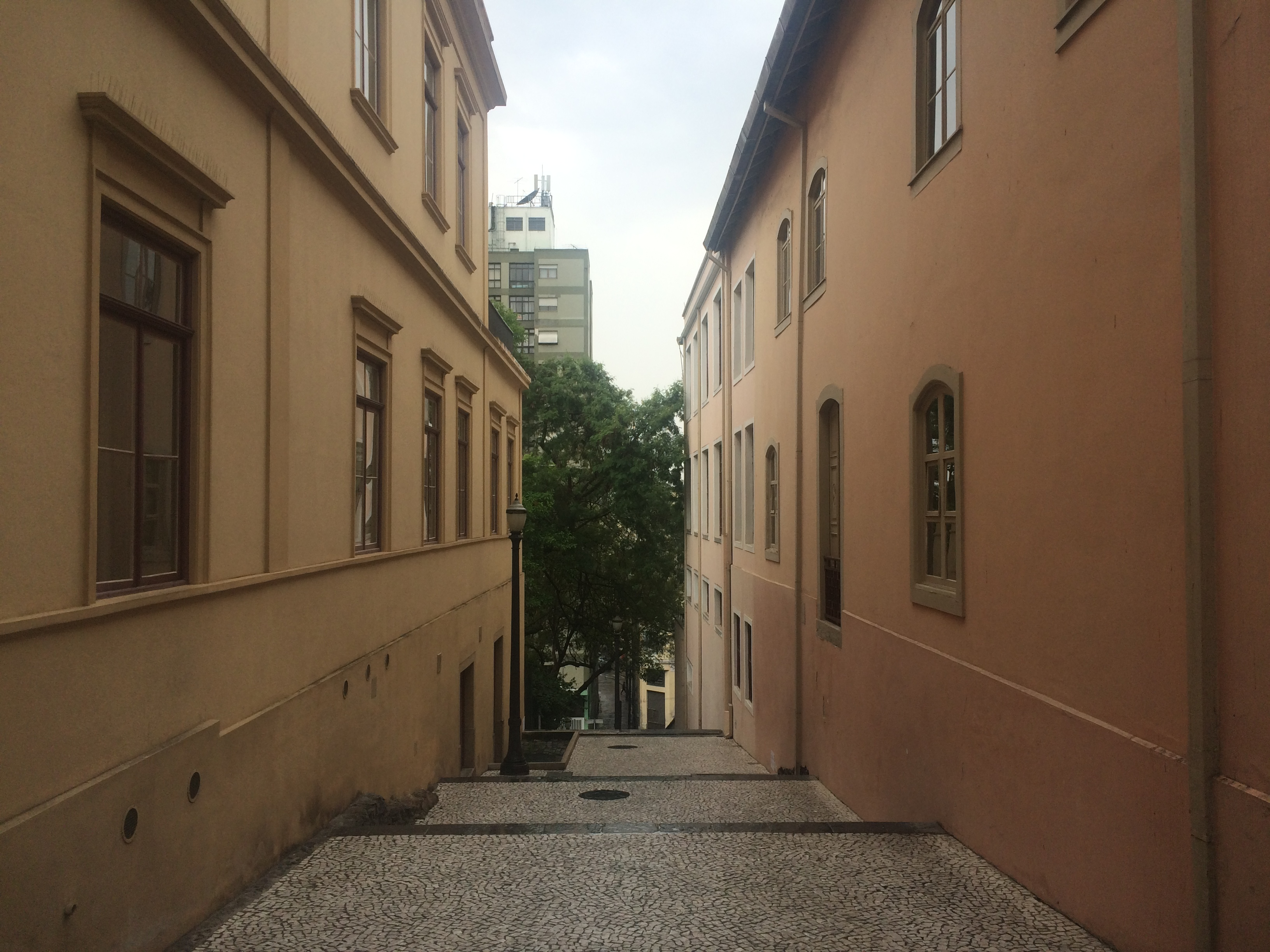
Front view from the Beco

=== Heritage Listing ===
The conservation status of Beco do Pinto is protected by decree number 26.818, from September 9, 1988, created during the government of Jânio Quadros in São Paulo. It determines the preservation of goods located inside the perimeter of Pátio do Colégio.

== Gallery ==
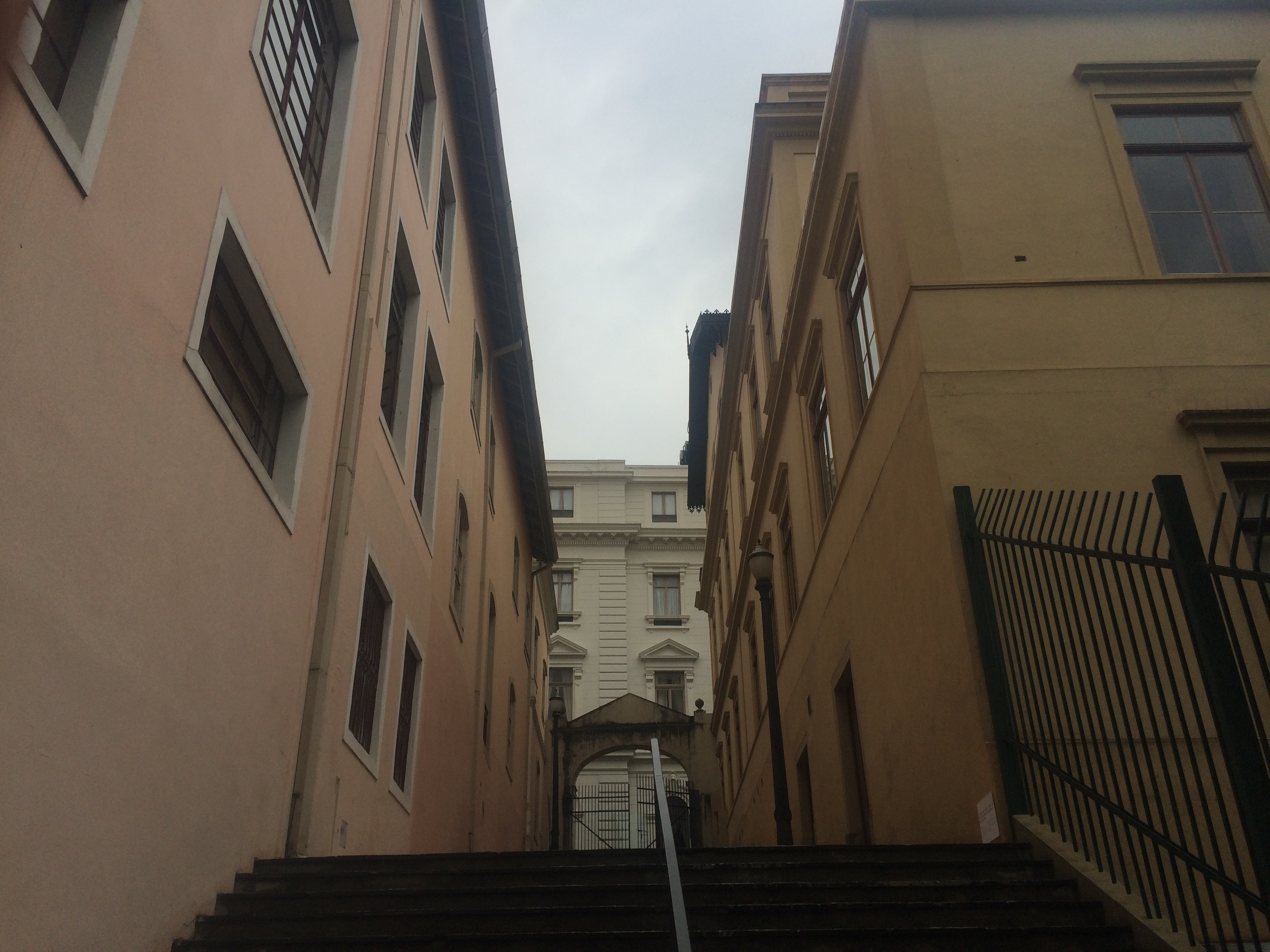
View of the Beco from the lower end

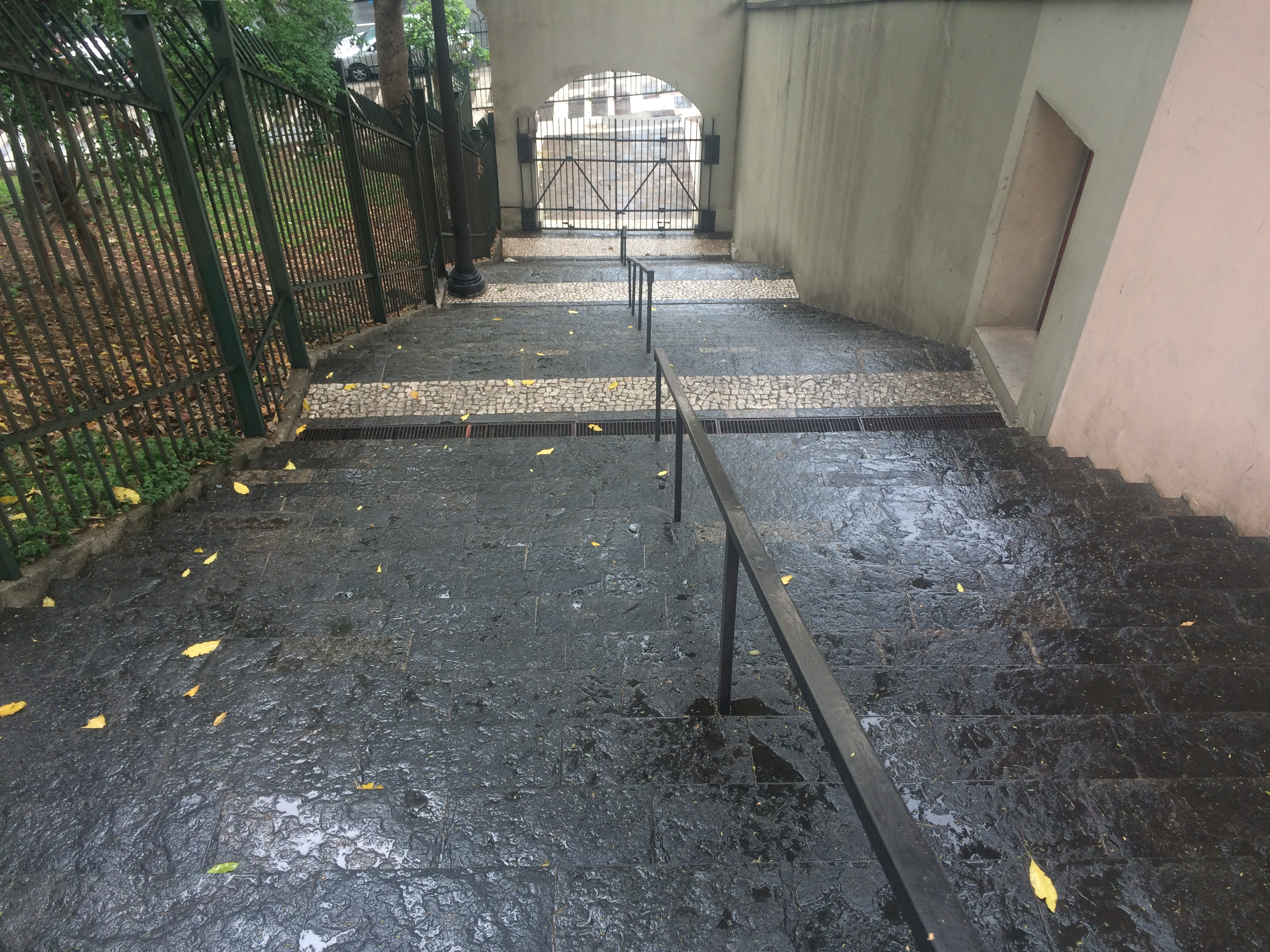
View of the Beco from the higher end

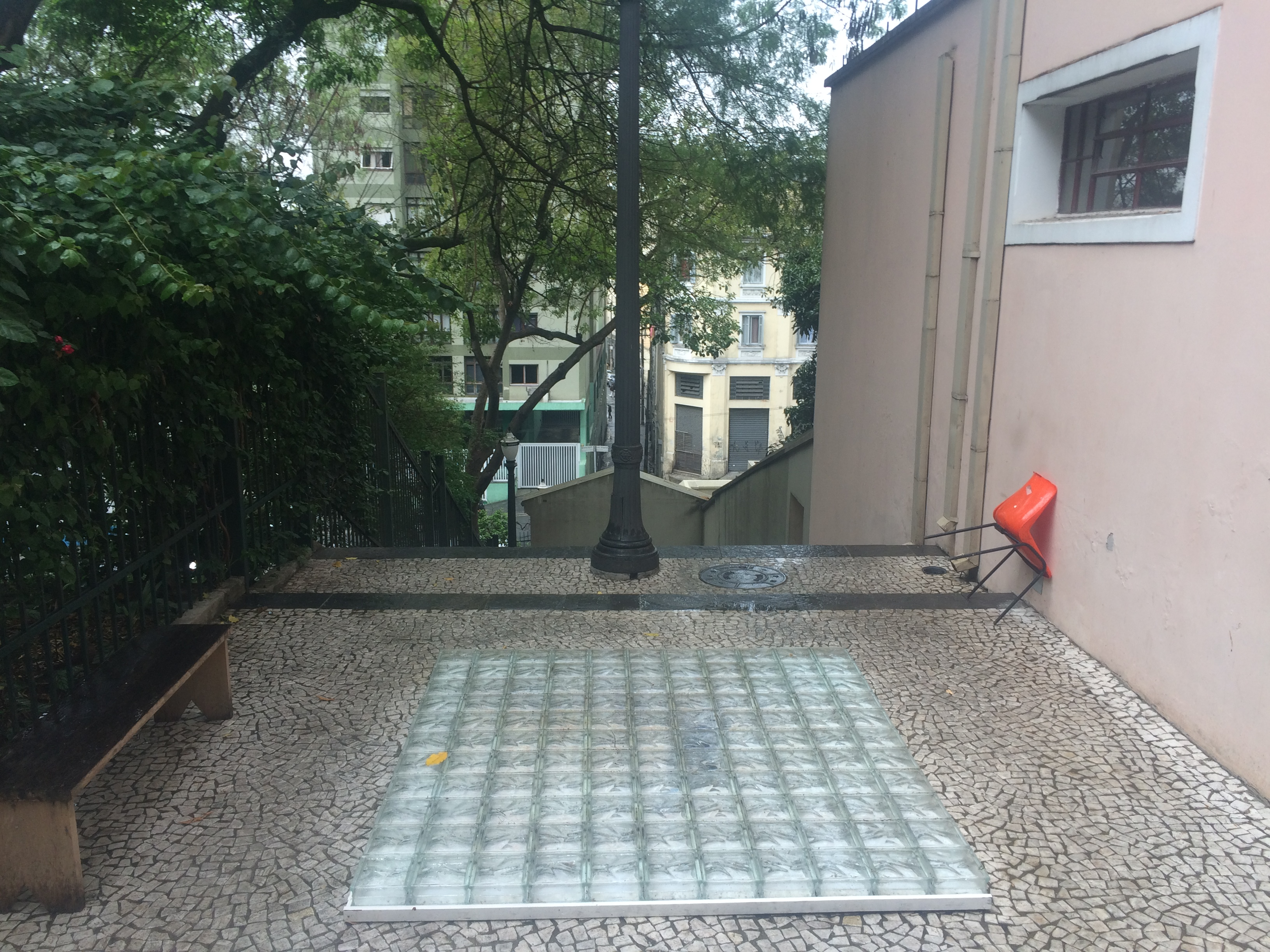
Glass detail between the stairways of Beco do Pinto

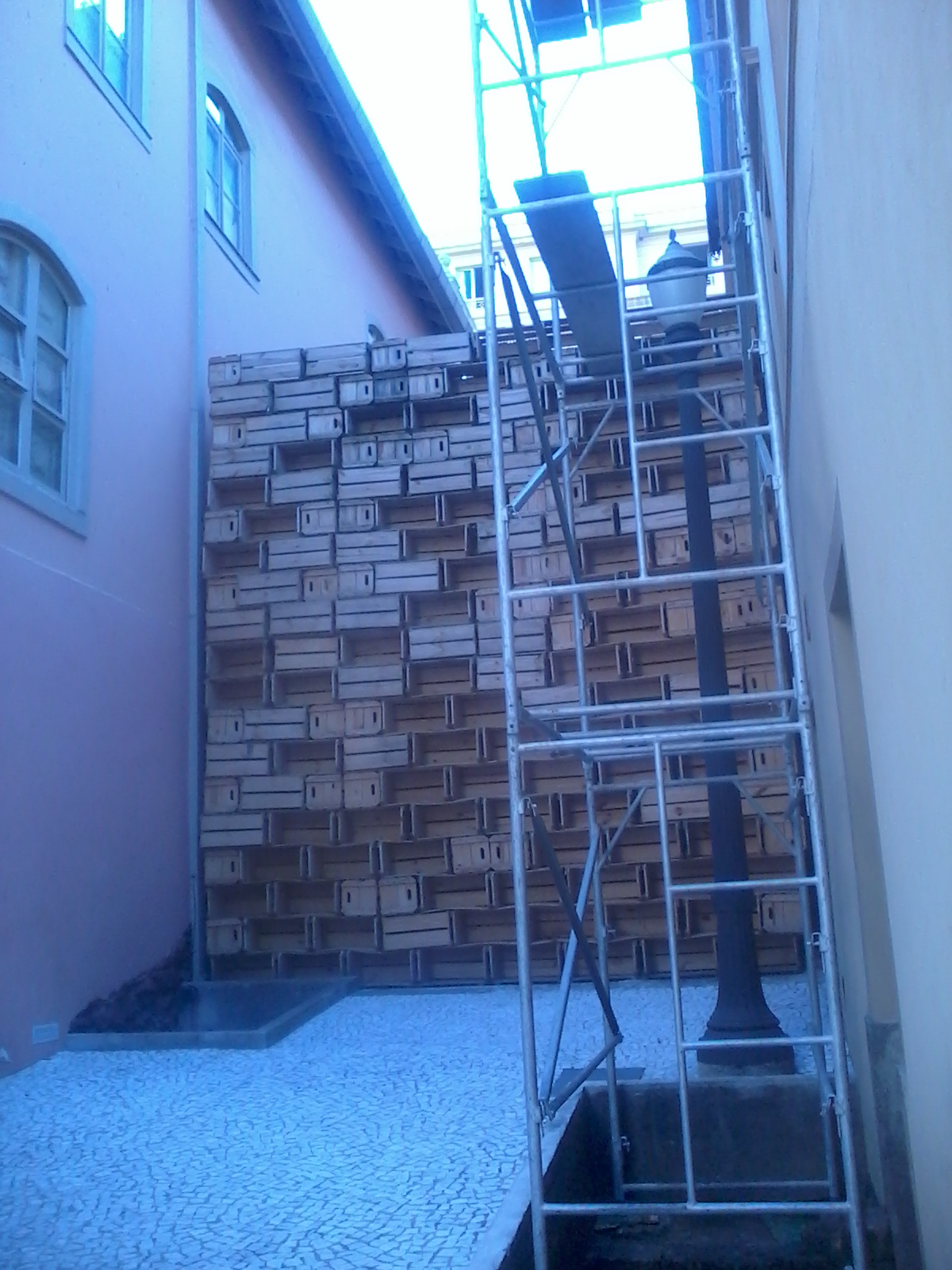
Artistic presentation in the middle of Beco do Pinto in 2013
