= School of Philosophy of São Bento =

School in São Paulo

- Faculdade de São Bento
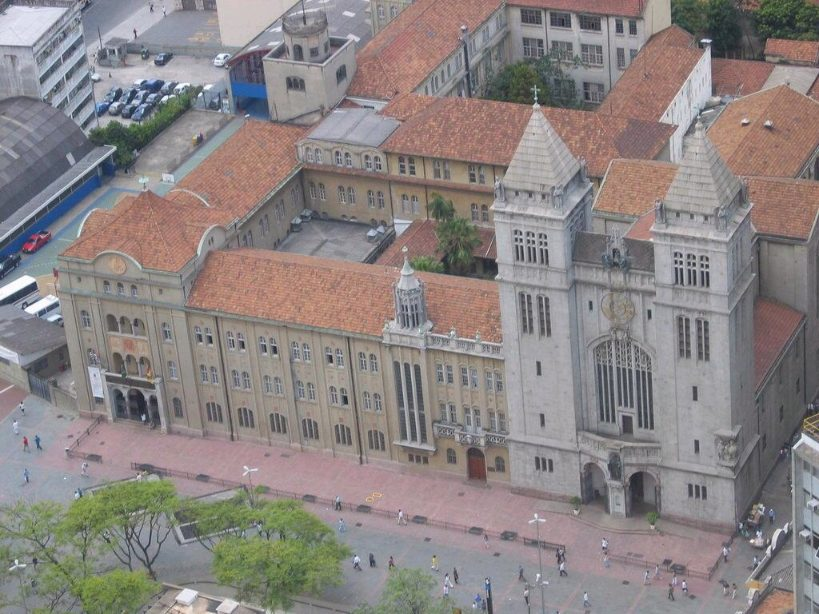
- Type: Private
- Established: July 15, 1908
- Rector: Camilo de Jesus Dantas
- Location: São Paulo, São Paulo; Brazil; 23°32′36″S 46°38′03″W
- Website: https://www.faculdadedesaobento.com.br/

The School of Philosophy of São Bento (Portuguese: Faculdade de São Bento) was Brazil's first Philosophy school. It is located in Largo São Bento, in the center of São Paulo, next to the Monastery of Saint Benedict, which dates back to 1598.

Founded in 1908, it was incorporated by PUC-SP (Pontifical Catholic University of São Paulo) in 1946 and returned to its activities with a new Philosophy degree program in 2002. It was initially attached to the University of Louvain, which sent professors such as Monsignor Carlos Sentroul and Leonardo Van Acker. In 2008, the School of Philosophy of São Bento celebrated its 100th anniversary and launched its Master's course in Philosophy.

== History ==
The School of Philosophy of São Bento was created on July 15, 1908, by Abbot Miguel Kruse. At a prior assembly, it was decided that the faculty would start with the Philosophy course, conducted by Monsignor Charles Sentroul, who had recently arrived from Belgium. However, classes began regularly on July 22. In the beginning, it was not supported by Brazilian educational legislation, but, in 1911, it became affiliated with the University of Louvain, which recognized all academic degrees. In 1917, Monsignor Sentroul left for Europe and, as a consequence of World War I, the school closed its doors. It reopened in 1922 in new premises at 21 Florêncio de Abreu Street, with an inaugural lecture given by Professor Leonardo Van Acker, who had arrived from Louvain.

In 1936, it underwent a major renovation in order to adjust to the laws that regulated higher education. Later, it was renamed School of Philosophy, Sciences and Letters of São Bento (Portuguese: Faculdade de Filosofia, Ciências e Letras de São Bento) and organized into four sections: Philosophy (comprising the Philosophy course); Sciences (Mathematics, Physics, Geography and History, Social Sciences courses); Languages (Classical, Neo-Latin and Anglo-Germanic languages courses); and Pedagogy (comprising the Pedagogy and didactics courses).

In 1943, the Academic Center of the School of Philosophy of São Bento was created as the official student body. In the same year, the school moved to new premises at 890 Higienópolis Avenue, provided by the Metropolitan Curia. In 1946, it was incorporated into the then-emerging Pontifical Catholic University of São Paulo. The faculty includes great national personalities as alumni, such as Alexandre Correia, André Franco Montoro, Vicente Rao, Honório Fernandes Monteiro, Camargo Guarnieri, Carlos Lopes de Mattos and Oswald de Andrade.

Through a project started in 1999, the Monastery of Saint Benedict requested authorization from the Ministry of Education (MEC) to set up a Degree Course in Philosophy, which was authorized in December 2001. Its activities began in 2002 and it was recognized in 2006. More recently, it decided to set up a bachelor's degree in the same course, whose approval was published on October 23, 2013, and activities began in February 2014.

== See also ==
- Monastery of Saint Benedict
- Central Zone of São Paulo
