= Anhangabaú River =

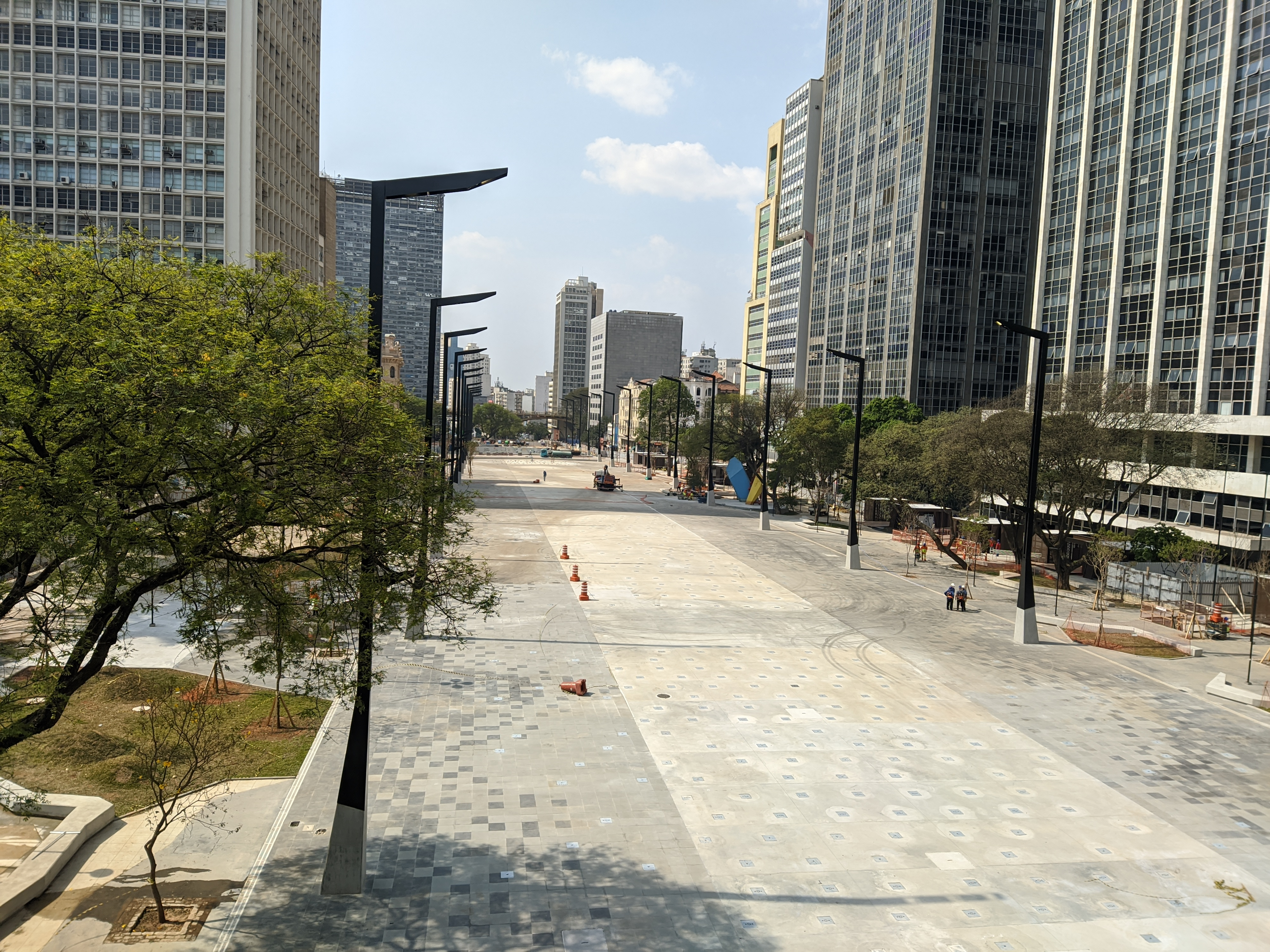
- Native name: Rio Anhangabaú (Portuguese)

Location
- Country: Brazil
- Location: São Paulo city, São Paulo state

Physical characteristics
- Source
  - location: Praça da Bandeira, São Paulo city
  - elevation: 450 ft (140 m)
- Mouth: Tamanduatei River
  - location: São Paulo city
  - coordinates: 23°32′S 46°38′W
  - elevation: 60 ft (18 m)

The Anhangabaú River (in Portuguese: Rio Anhangabaú) is a river in São Paulo, Brazil.

The Anhangabaú River cuts through the very oldest part of central São Paulo, though it has been canalized since the first decade of the 20th century.

The green space and plazas above the subterranean river is a popular place for various large public gatherings, including cultural events at the annual Virada Cultural, as well as numerous political protests. On 16 April 1984, approximately 1.5 million people gathered in the Anhangabaú Valley to protest the military dictatorship.

== See also ==
- List of rivers of São Paulo
