= Tamanduateí River =

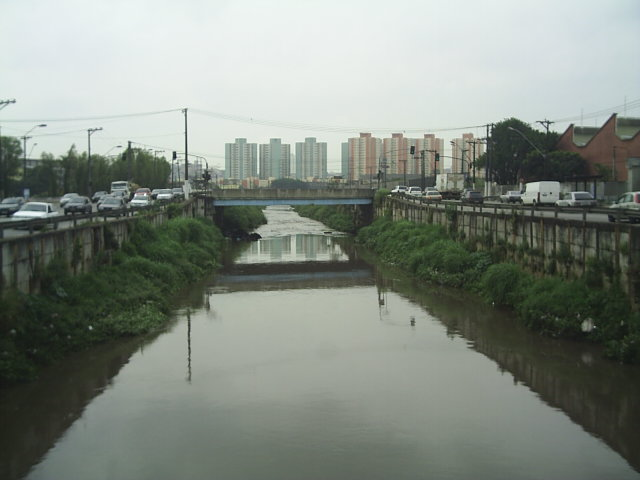
- Native name: Rio Tamanduateí (Portuguese)

Location
- Country: Brazil
- Region: Greater São Paulo, São Paulo state

Physical characteristics
- Source
  - location: Serra do Mar, São Paulo state
- Mouth: Tietê River
  - location: São Paulo city
  - coordinates: 23°31′S 46°38′W
- Length: 35 km (22 mi)
- Basin size: 320 km^{2} (120 sq mi)

The Tamanduateí River (in Portuguese: Rio Tamanduateí, Portuguese pronunciation: [tamɐ̃dwate'i]) is a river of São Paulo state in southeastern Brazil.

== See also ==
- List of rivers of São Paulo
