= Amalie Bensinger =

German painter (1809–1889)

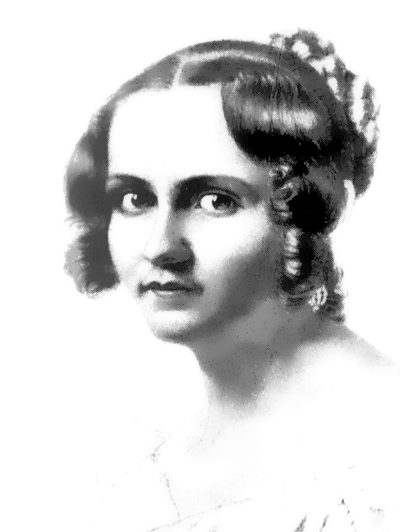
Self-portrait (c.1840)

Amalie Bensinger (28 March 1809 – 16 November 1889) was a German painter associated with the Nazarene movement.

== Biography ==
She was born in Bruchsal to an old merchant family from Mannheim that was originally Jewish and had been converted. Her father, a court attorney, was a Catholic, but she was raised in her mother's evangelical Protestant faith. In 1835, she began her studies at the Malschule for women (part of the Kunstakademie Düsseldorf) with Julius Hübner and Karl Ferdinand Sohn. After further studies in Mannheim and Karlsruhe, she went to Italy in 1851; first visiting Florence, then Rome.

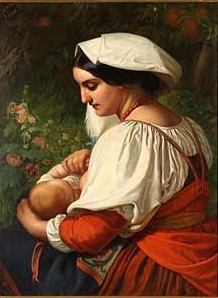
Pomona

There, she befriended Joseph Victor von Scheffel and served as the model for a minor character in his first work, a novel in verse, Der Trompeter von Säckingen, which was very popular; becoming the basis for an opera by Viktor Nessler and, in 1907, a silent movie by Franz Porten. She was also the inspiration for a scene from his novel Ekkehard.

She also came into contact with the Nazarenes; notably Peter von Cornelius and Friedrich Overbeck, who greatly influenced her work. She soon began producing paintings with religious themes and made plans to establish an artistic community for women, similar to the one established by the Nazarenes at the Sant’Isidoro a Capo le Case monastery.

In 1857, she returned to Germany, possibly with Scheffel. Three years later, she converted to Catholicism at Lichtenthal Abbey. This capped a period when she had studied religious books and Biblical themes to paint an altar at the parish church of Saints Peter and Paul in Lahr.

She then came into contact with the church painters Desiderius Lenz) and Gabriel Wüger), who were in the process of developing their own variation on the Nazarene style that would come to be known as the Beuron school.

In 1864, she began a major project; an "art monastery" that was originally intended for Rome but, because of her friendship with Katharina von Hohenzollern-Sigmaringen, her works were placed in the Beuron Archabbey.

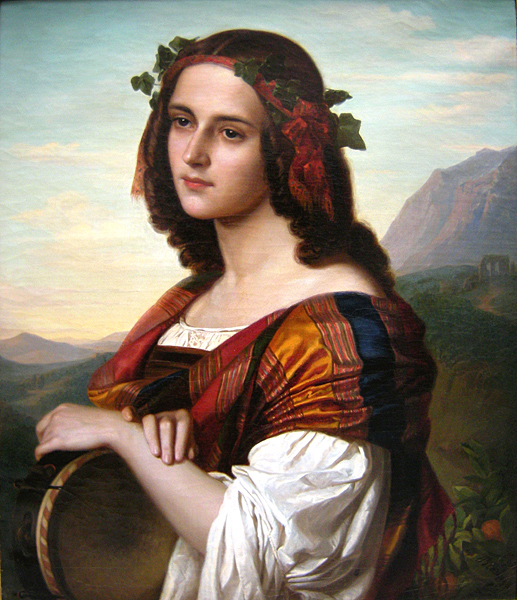
Italian Girl with Tambourine

Still devoted to her idea of a monastic community for artists, she moved to Reichenau Island and acquired the "Schlößle", a manor house she meant to become a female branch of the Archabbey. A fresco (now lost) was painted on the façade by Wüger, but very little else was accomplished and the dream was never realized. She remained at Reichenau, near Mitelzell Abbey, painting religious works, and died there at the age of eighty. Her grave was adorned with a figure of Saint Pirmin, who had served as Abbot there.

== See also ==
- List of German women artists
