= St. Mary's (German) Church, McKeesport =

St. Mary's (German) Roman Catholic Church
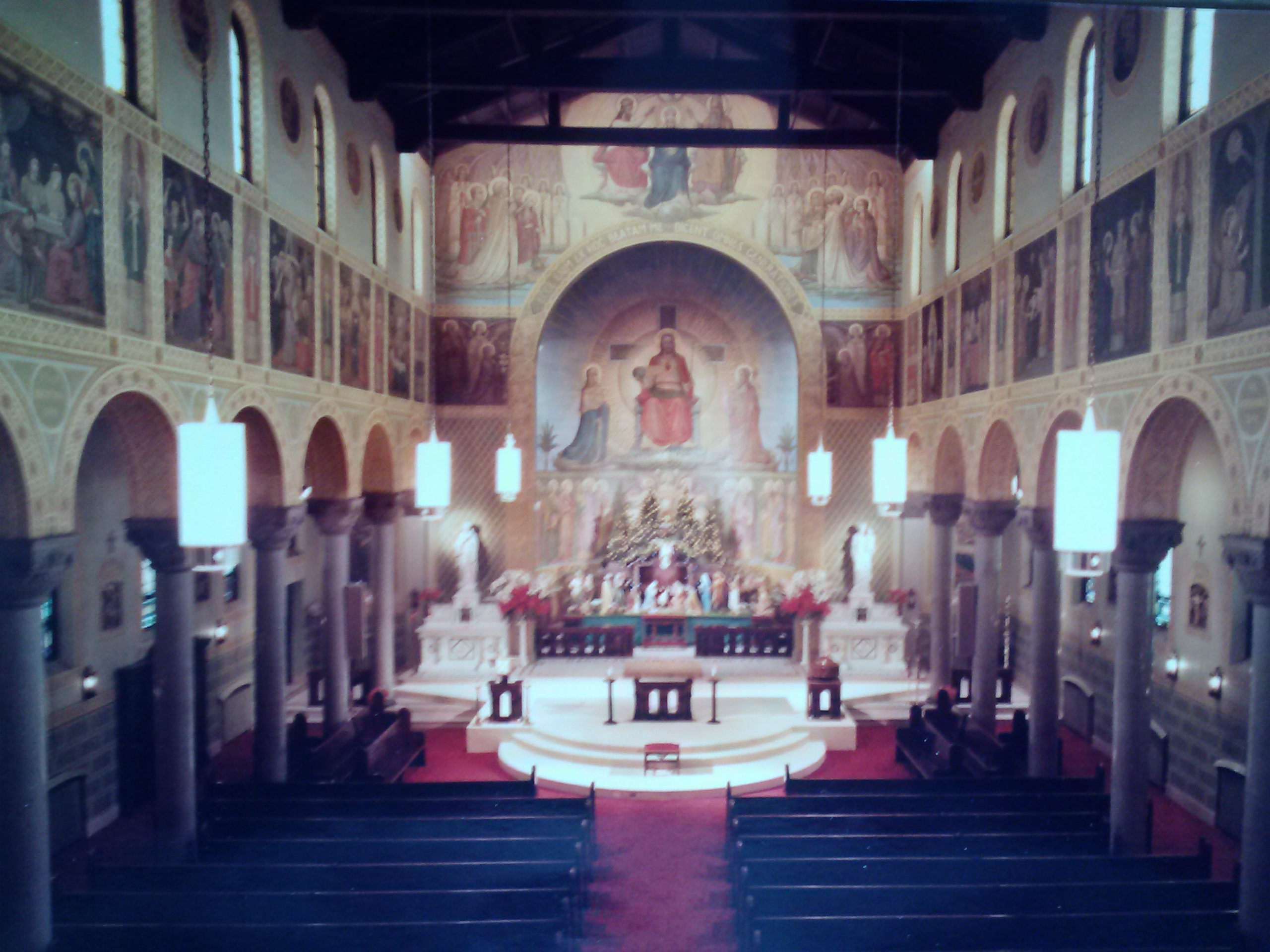
- St Mary's (German) Church, interior, December 1987

- Location in Pennsylvania
- 40°20′54″N 79°51′45″W
- Location: 414 Olive Street, McKeesport, Pennsylvania
- Country: United States
- Denomination: Roman Catholic

History
- Founded: 1887
- Dedication: April 29, 1888

Architecture
- Architectural type: Basilica
- Groundbreaking: September 23, 1906
- Completed: April 26, 1908
- Closed: October 24, 1993
- Demolished: January 15, 1997

St. Mary's (German) Church was a Roman Catholic church in McKeesport, Pennsylvania, noteworthy for being the only church in the United States built in the early Christian Basilica model.

During the 1980s, the church hosted a Broadway-inspired stage show in its parish hall featuring Rev. Tom Smith.

== Early history ==
The parish was founded in 1887 by German immigrants living in McKeesport desiring to have a school where the German language would be spoken. The cornerstone for the church building located at 414 Olive Street was laid on September 23, 1906, and the church was dedicated on April 26, 1908. St. Mary's Church was built in the early Christian Basilica model, the only church of its type in the United States. The church was further set apart from other churches by the addition of a series of Beuronese murals representing the Life of Christ. These religious decorative artworks were painted between 1908 and 1910 by the Revs. Bonaventure Ostendarp and Raphael Pfisterer of the Order of St. Benedict at Saint Anselm College, Goffstown, New Hampshire.

== Demolition ==
The church was renovated in the early 1960s, the late 1960s and in the 1980s. By this time, however, the population of McKeesport had been steadily dropping. Within a few years, it became obvious that the city could no longer support the number of existing parishes. In 1993, St. Mary's merged with Holy Trinity, St. Peter and Sacred Heart parishes to form the new St. Martin de Porres parish. As part of the merger, the decision was made to close St. Mary's Church. The last Mass at the church was held on October 24, 1993. The church was demolished in 1997. Prior to demolition, several of the murals were removed and purchased by other churches.

== Beuronese murals ==
A series of murals entitled "Life of the Virgin" were copied by Revs. Ostendorp and Pfister from the original "Life of the Virgin" series in the Benedictine Abbey of Emmaus in Prague, Czech Republic. The original series was created under the direction of Desiderius Lenz, Gabriel Wüger, and Lukas Steiner between 1880 and 1887 and was subsequently destroyed by fire in 1945, during World War II. (A second set of duplicates were painted for the Abbey Church of the Immaculate Conception Benedictine Abbey in Conception, Missouri.) The "Life of the Virgin" murals were painted on 6' x 7' canvases and tacked to the walls of St. Mary's with a mixture of glue, paint, and plaster, twenty feet from ground level.

In the summer of 1996 they were removed, and were publicly auctioned December 7, 1996 where they were purchased by someone on behalf of the SSPX's Our Lady of Fatima Catholic Church (Carnegie, Pennsylvania). For their preservation and eventual installation at Our Lady of Fatima, a support frame was built for each and stretched with fresh canvas to which the mural canvases were then adhered with "rabbit skin" glue, a natural adhesive. The surfaces were painstakingly hand-cleaned with turpentine using cotton balls and Q-tips. They were framed in gold-painted wood and hung. The cost of this "Part I" restoration by an art professional was $1000 per mural.

With the congregation of Our Lady of Fatima relocating to St. James Church (Pittsburgh, Pennsylvania) in late 2014/early 2015, the murals were again available for purchase at a price of "$150,000 or best offer for the set". It is not clear where the murals currently reside.

== See also ==
- Beuron Art School
