= Heinrich Suso Mayer =

Heinrich Suso Mayer OSB, usually called just Suso Mayer, né Franz Mayer (born April 17, 1890 in Hohenberg near Ellwangen, † May 22, 1963 in Beuron), was a German Benedictine and priest.

== Life ==
After completing his humanistic studies in Ellwangen, Franz Mayer entered the Beuron monastery in 1909 and professed his first vows in 1911. After the novitiate, he studied philosophy and theology in Maria Laach and Beuron. During the First World War he did military service as a medical soldier.

Subsequently to his ordination as a priest in 1920, P. Suso studied at the Benedictine College of San Anselmo in Rome and acquired the Dr. iur. can. in 1923 After that, he taught canon law as a lecturer at the Theological College in Beuron until 1936. There, P. Suso also held the office of a vice rector. In 1925/1926 he stayed for a year at the University of Berlin, where he especially attended lectures by Ulrich Stutz. His friendship with the canonist August Hagen also began in Berlin. On his return, Meyer published his doctoral thesis on Die Klöster in Preußen ("The Monasteries in Prussia") in 1927.

Archabbot Raphael Walzer appointed P. Suso prior of Beuron in November 1936; he remained in this function until April 1938. The subsequent abbot Benedikt Baur sent P. Suso in 1938 to the Beuron priory of Tonogaoka in Japan. In 1939 P. Suso travelled to the United States in order to look for charitable donations for the newfounded monastery in Japan. Surprised by the outbreak of World War II, P. Suso stayed at St. Gregory's Abbey in Shawnee (Oklahoma), where he lectured on canon law and pastoral care for Benedictine students.

P. Suso Mayer died in Beuron in 1963, where he was sub-prior of the abbey. He published numerous theological writings and, among other things, published the four-volume Neueste Kirchenrechts-Sammlung (“Latest Canon Law Collection”) from 1953 onwards.

== Works ==
P. Suso wrote almost 60 works, but is most known for his publications on consecrated virginity and canon law. Some main works are:

- Ehe und Jungfräulichkeit, Beuron 1928
- Braut des Königs – Jungfräulichkeit in Kloster und Welt und Jungfrauenweihe, Beuron 1956
- Der Klosterberuf – Ein Ratgeber für solche, die ins Kloster gehen wollen, für Ordensobere und Seelenführer, Beuron 1961
- Beuroner Bibliographie – Schriftsteller und Künstler während der ersten hundert Jahre des Benediktinerklosters Beuron 1863–1963, Beuron 1963
