= Maurus Wolter =

German Benedictine abbot

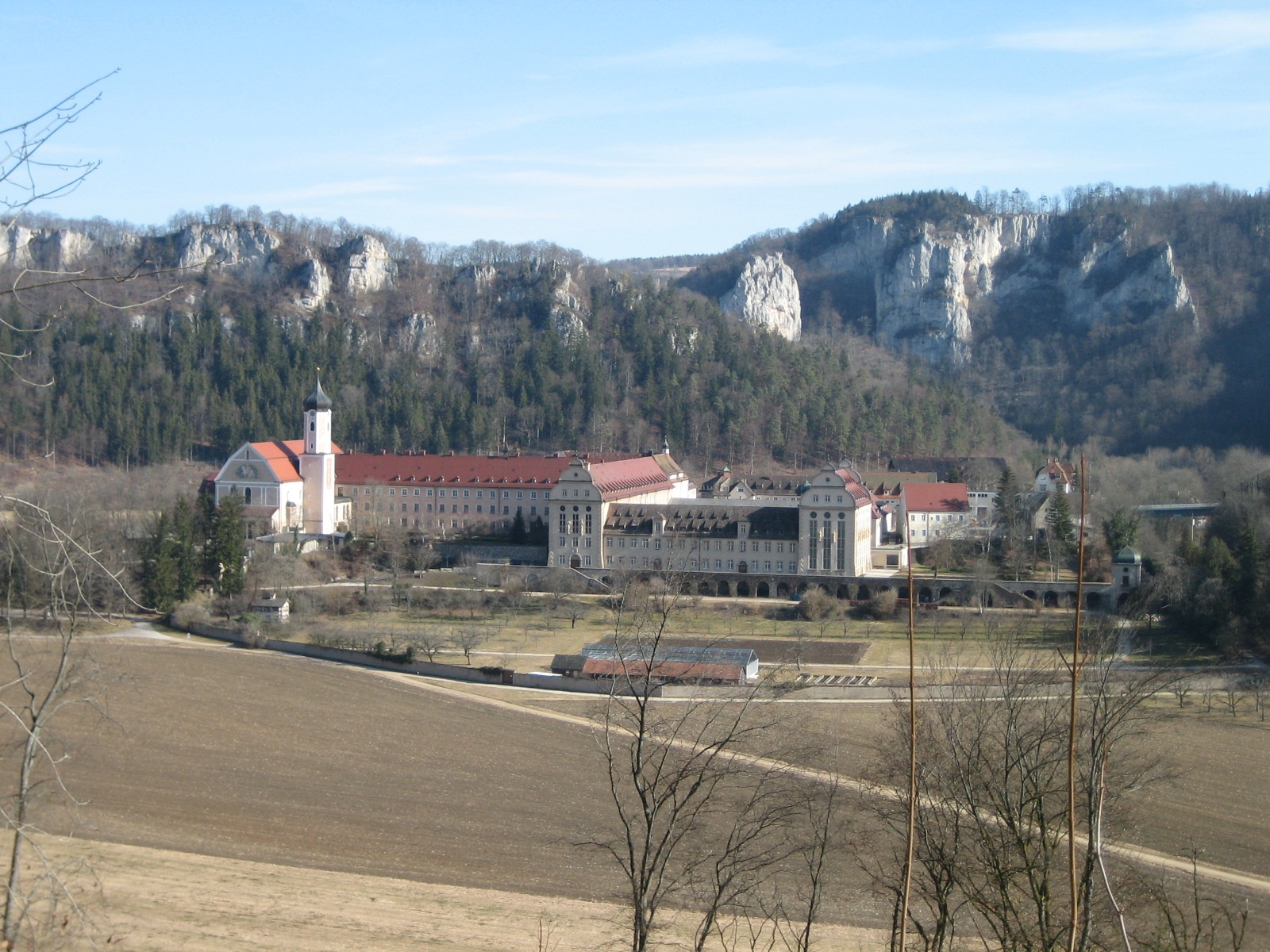
The archabbey at Beuron, founded by Maurus and Placidus Wolter

Maurus Wolter (4 June 1825, in Bonn – 8 July 1890, in Beuron) was the first abbot of the Benedictine Beuron Archabbey, which he founded with his brother Placidus in 1863.

== Biography ==
=== Early life ===
Rudolph Wolter was born in Bonn, the third of twelve children born to Lorenz and Elisabeth Schuchart Wolter. His father, a brewer, was Catholic; his mother Protestant. Rudolph was baptized in the Catholic Collegiate Church. Five of his siblings chose a religious profession; two, Karl and Ernst, became Benedictine monks.

He attended the Royal Gymnasium in Bonn, and in 1844 began studies in philology, philosophy and theology at the Rheinische Friedrich-Wilhelms University. In 1849 Rudolf Wolter entered the seminary in Cologne. After being ordained on September 3, 1850, he took up his first position as vicar and rector of the new general higher city school in Jülich. There he founded the first German Catholic workers' association (Jülicher-Kranken- Arbeiter-Verein). In 1852 he passed the state examination for teaching at a grammar school in Münster. In 1854, he was transferred to the higher Stiftsschule in Aachen, where his brother Ernst was already teaching. The two shared an apartment until Ernst Wolter entered the Roman Benedictine Abbey of St. Paul Outside the Walls in 1855, receiving the name "Placidus".

=== Benedictine Monk ===
In November 1856, Rudolph began his novitiate in Perugia, and was given the name "Maurus". In 1857, he professed as a Benedictine monk with the Cassinese Congregation at the Abbey of St. Paul Outside the Walls in Rome.

In the summer of 1859, he stayed in Tivoli for a cure. There he was introduced to Katharina von Hohenzollern-Sigmaringen, who had just fled the novitiate of the Roman nunnery of Sant'Ambrogio after a poison attack on her life. The princess confided in the monk in confession. He instructed her to report it to the Holy Office. This set in motion an investigation.

In 1860, Von Hohenzollern asked the Wolter brothers to accompany her on a pilgrimage to the Holy Land. The princess became sympathetic to their views for the restoration of monastic life in Germany, and had the political and financial resources to assist. The following year, they received permission from their abbot to found a daughter house in Germany.

In 1863, the Wolters established an abbey on the site of a former Augustinian monastery on Hohenzollern land in Beuron. Maurus became the first abbot. He implemented his vision of a liturgical life by emphasizing a return to the original sources of monastic tradition. As St. Martin's Abbey began to distance itself from the motherhouse in Rome, it developed close links with Abbot Prosper Guéranger at Solesmes. Wolter revived the ancient way of interpreting the Psalter, used it in contemporary form and utilized it in the training of novices. Abbot Maurus was also one of the founders of the Beuron Art School.

In 1872, St. Martin Abbey established a priory at Maredsous. Placidus became prior in 1874, and abbot in 1878.

With the implementation of the Prussian law of May 31, 1875 against all Catholic orders and congregations that were not active in nursing, on December 3, 1875, the monastery had to be closed. Maurus Wolter moved to Volders in Austria with most of the monks. Princess von Hohenzollern managed the buildings and lands during their absence until the monks could return in 1887. Upon Maurus' death in 1890, Placidus succeeded him as abbot at Beuron.

== Works ==
- The Principles of Monasticism (1880)
- The Roman Catacombs with H. S. Butterfield

== See also ==
- Desiderius Lenz
- Gabriel Wüger
