= Schott =

Schott may refer to:

- Heinrich Wilhelm Schott, Austrian botanist whose standard author abbreviation is Schott
- Schott (surname)
- Schott Dscherid Salt Plain near Nafta, Tunisia
- Schott AG, a German glass products manufacturer
- Schott frères, a Belgium music publisher, now part of Schott Music
- Schott Music, a German music publisher
- Schott NYC, a New York clothing company
- The Jerome Schottenstein Center ("Schott"), a multi-purpose arena in Columbus, Ohio, United States
- 5312 Schott (1981 VP2), a main-belt asteroid

== See also ==
- Shott (disambiguation)
