= Neidingen =

- Ortsteil of Beuron
- Interactive map of Neidingen
- Location within Germany Location within Baden-Württemberg
- Coordinates: 48°06′N 9°04′E
- Country: Germany
- State: Baden-Württemberg
- Admin. region: Tübingen
- District: Sigmaringen
- Municipality: Beuron

Population (2007)
  - Total: 100
- Demonym: Neidinger
- Time zone: UTC+01:00 (CET)
  - Summer (DST): UTC+02:00 (CEST)
- Postal codes: 88631
- Dialling codes: 07579
- Vehicle registration: SIG

Neidingen is a German village with approximately 100 inhabitants and part of the municipality of Beuron, in Baden-Württemberg. The village is historically important as health retreat and place of death of Emperor Charles the Fat (d. 888) whose death ends the Carolingian Empire (in historiographic accounting) the last of the great Frankish kingdoms of the Early Middle Ages.

== History ==
=== Overview ===
First mentioned in 1390, Neidingen was an autonomous municipality until 1973, when it merged to Beuron.

=== Charles the Fat's death ===
Charles the Fat, suffering what is believed to be epilepsy, could not secure the kingdom against Viking raiders, and after buying their withdrawal from Paris in 886 was perceived by the court as being cowardly and incompetent. The following year his nephew Arnulf of Carinthia, the illegitimate son of King Carloman of Bavaria, raised the standard of rebellion. Instead of fighting the insurrection, Charles fled to Neidingen and died the following year in 888, leaving a divided entity and a succession mess.
