= Shott =

Shott may refer to:

- John Shott
- Hugh Ike Shott
- Chott

== See also ==
- St. Shott's
- Schott (disambiguation)
