= Vade retro satana =

Medieval Western Christian exorcism formula

Abbreviation of the text of Vade retro satana (...V R S...) on the obverse of a Saint Benedict Medal

Vade retro satana (Ecclesiastical Latin for "Begone, Satan", "Step back, Satan", or "Back off, Satan"; alternatively spelt vade retro satanas, or sathanas), is a medieval Western Christian formula for exorcism, recorded in a 1415 manuscript found in the Benedictine Metten Abbey in Bavaria; its origin is traditionally associated with the Benedictines. (Note: The Benedictine monastic tradition is found in all major historic Christian denominations, such as the Abbey of Saint-Joseph de Clairval of the Catholic Church, the Östanbäck Monastery of the Evangelical Lutheran Church of Sweden, the Saint Finian Orthodox Abbey of Western Orthodoxy, the Holy Cross Monastery of the Protestant Episcopal Church in the United States of America, and the Saint Brigid of Kildare Monastery of the United Methodist Church, for example.) The initials of this formula (VRSNSMV SMQLIVB or VRS:NSMV:SMQL:IVB) have often been engraved around crucifixes or the Saint Benedict Medals of Western Christianity since at least 1780.

The phrase is also used allusively in literary contexts to depict rejection of possibly tempting, but undesirable, proposals; in such cases, it is generally used without any religious connotations.

== Text ==
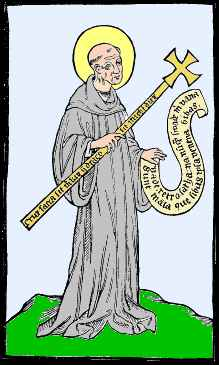
Image of Saint Benedict with a cross and a scroll stating Vade retro satana based on the last page of the 1415 book found in the library of Metten Abbey

The Ecclesiastical Latin text, here alongside an approximate translation, says:

Crux sacra sit mihi lux
Non draco sit mihi dux
Vade retro satana
Numquam suade mihi vana
Sunt mala quae libas
Ipse venena bibas

Translation:

May the Holy Cross be my light
May the dragon never be my guide
Begone Satan
Never tempt me with your vanities
What you offer me is evil
drink the poison yourself

== Origins and history ==
The verse Vade retro satana is similar to a phrase that appears in several places in the New Testament. Firstly, in the Gospel of Mark, 8:33, spoken by Jesus to Peter is the admonition: "Vade retro me satana", ('Get behind me, Satan!') (Note: In older translations, "Get thee behind me, Satan!" For the verse, see: Mark 8:33) This story is repeated in Matthew 16:23. (Note: Matthew 16:23) A similar phrase is used in the Gospel of Matthew's account of Christ's Temptation. (Note: For a number of translations, see: Matthew 4:10 - "The Temptation of Jesus", BibleHub)

The exact origin of the passage as a whole is not clear. It is found in an early thirteenth century legend of the Devil's Bridge at Sens, wherein an architect sold his soul to the devil and then subsequently repented. M. le Curé of Sens, wearing his stole, exorcised the devil, driving him away with holy water and these words, which he made the penitent repeat.

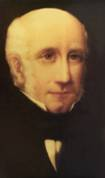
Venerable Leo Dupont

The passage came to general attention in 1647, when women who were prosecuted for witchcraft declared that they had been unable to do harm where there was a cross, and the St. Michael's Benedictine Abbey in Metten was particularly exempt from their influence. A search of the monastery turned up crosses painted on the walls with the formula's initials. The meaning of those letters remained a mystery for some time, until the complete verses were found in a manuscript dating to 1415 in the abbey's library, next to an image of St. Benedict.

The same formula was later found in an Austrian manuscript from c. 1340–1350. The manuscript depicts Satan offering a drinking cup to the Saint, who keeps him at bay with a long cross-topped staff carrying a red banner. Below the staff is a single line of text, and below it are six lines of verse, starting with "Vade retro Satana".

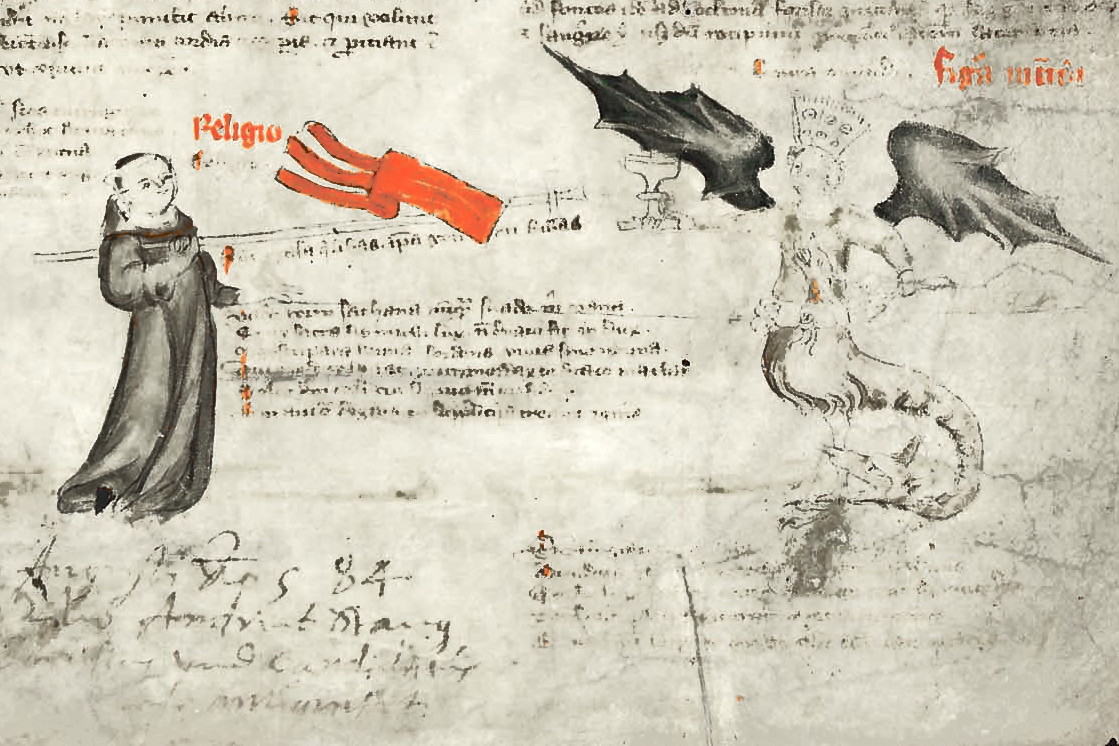
Satan offers a cup to the Saint, who keeps him at bay. (Detail from the medieval Austrian manuscript Heinemann Nr 40 first published c. 1340.)

The formula received the approval of Pope Benedict XIV, becoming part of the Roman Ritual (the liturgical books detailing the offices a priest or deacon may perform) of the Catholic Church in 1742. The formula's popularity grew considerably in the 19th century, mainly due to the efforts of Leo Dupont. According to publisher and historian H. C. Lea (1896): "As a rule ... it suffices to wear one [a Saint Benedict medal] devoutly, but, if some special favor is desired, it is advisable on a Tuesday to say five Glorias, three Aves and then three more Glorias to secure the protection of St. Benedict."

The vade retro satana is still included in the Roman Ritual. Following the 20th-century revision of the liturgical books, the latest version concerning exorcisms was promulgated in 1999 as the volume De exorcismis et supplicationibus quibusdam.

The phrase vade retro satana is also used as a witty or scholarly prose device, dissociated from its religious implications, to express strong rejection of an unacceptable (but possibly tempting) proposal, or dread of some looming menace. Namely, in the sense of "do not tempt me!", "I will have nothing to do with that", "will someone deliver us from that", and so on. (Note: See for example: Sir Walter Scott, 1822 The Fortunes of Nigel. Chapter 31: "Ne inducas in tentationem—Vade retro, Sathanas!—Amen")

== See also ==
- Deus vult
