= Princess Katharina of Hohenlohe-Waldenburg-Schillingsfürst =

Katharina of Hohenlohe-Waldenburg-Schillingsfürst
- Countess Erwin von Ingelheim; Princess of Hohenzollern-Sigmaringen
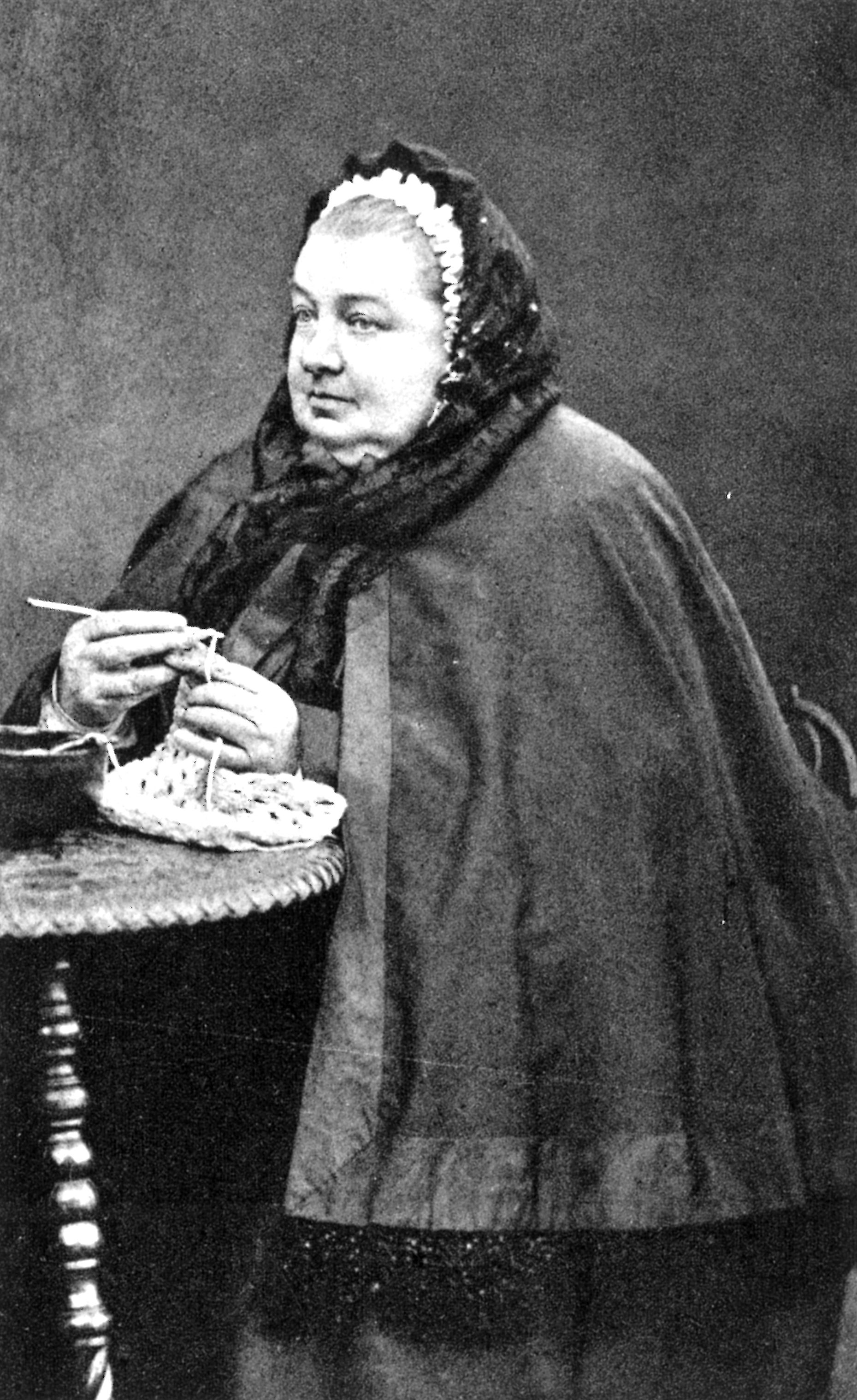
- Born: 19 January 1817; Stuttgart
- Died: 15 February 1893 (aged 76); Freiburg im Breisgau
- Spouse: Count Erwin von Ingelheim (m. 1838; died 1845); Charles, Prince of Hohenzollern-Sigmaringen (m. 1848; died 1853)
Names
- Katharina Wilhelmine Maria Josepha
- House: House of Hohenlohe-Waldenburg-Schillingsfürst House of Ingelheim House of Hohenzollern-Sigmaringen
- Father: Charles Albert III, Prince of Hohenlohe-Waldenburg-Schillingsfürst
- Mother: Princess Leopoldine of Fürstenberg

Princess Katharina Wilhelmine Maria Josepha of Hohenlohe-Waldenburg-Schillingsfürst (19 January 1817 – 15 February 1893) was a member of the House of Hohenlohe-Waldenburg-Schillingsfürst by birth and a member of the House of Hohenzollern-Sigmaringen and Princess consort of Hohenzollern-Sigmaringen by marriage.

== Early life ==
Princess Katharina was the only daughter of Charles Albert III, Prince of Hohenlohe-Waldenburg-Schillingsfürst (1776–1843) by his second marriage to Princess Leopoldine zu Fürstenberg (1791–1844). After the separation of her parents she lived with her mother in Donaueschingen.

== Marriages ==
In 1838 she married Franz Erwin, Count von Ingelheim genannt Echter von und zu Mespelbrunn (1812-1845); the marriage was childless. After the death of her first husband, she married in 1848 Charles, Prince of Hohenzollern-Sigmaringen as his second wife. Charles was a widower of Princess Marie Antoinette Murat, niece of Joachim Murat, King of the Two Sicilies, by whom he already had four children. For Katharina, this second marriage was also childless.

== Widowhood ==
After Charles' death Katharina entered the convent of Sant'Ambrogio della Massima in Rome as a novice. She made complaint where a cult of personality had developed regarding one of the sisters. She then became seriously ill. Convinced she was being poisoned, she managed to get word to her cousin, Gustav Adolf, Cardinal Prince of Hohenlohe-Schillingsfürst, who immediately removed her from the convent and brought her to his estate, the Villa d'Este in Tivoli, to recover. There she was introduced to the Benedictine monk Maurus Wolter. The princess confided in the monk, who instructed her to report it to the Holy Office. This set in motion an investigation, during which a number of irregularities at the convent came to light.

In 1860 Von Hohenzollern asked Maurus and his brother Ernst, also a Benedictine, to accompany her on a pilgrimage to the Holy Land. The princess became sympathetic to their views for the restoration of monastic life in Germany, and had the political and financial resources to assist. The following year, they received permission from their abbot at the Abbey of St. Paul Outside the Walls to found a daughter house in Germany. In 1863, the Wolters established an abbey on the site of a former Augustinian monastery on Hohenzollern land in Beuron.

== Bibliography ==
- Hubert Wolf: Die Nonnen von Sant’ Ambrogio. Eine wahre Geschichte. München, 2013

Princess Katharina of Hohenlohe-Waldenburg-Schillingsfürst House of Hohenlohe-Waldenburg-Schillingsfürst Born: 19 January 1817 Died: 15 February 1893
German nobility
Preceded by Marie Antoinette Murat	Princess consort of Hohenzollern-Sigmaringen; 1848–1853	Succeeded by Princess Josephine of Baden
