= Tutilo Burger =

German priest

Tutilo Burger OSB (born 8 September 1965, Löffingen, as Heinz Burger) is a German Benedictine. He took as his monastic name Tutilo, after the saint, monk and composer Tuotilo. Since 2011 he has been the eleventh archabbot of Beuron Archabbey, whilst his elder brother Stephan Burger is Archbishop of Freiburg.

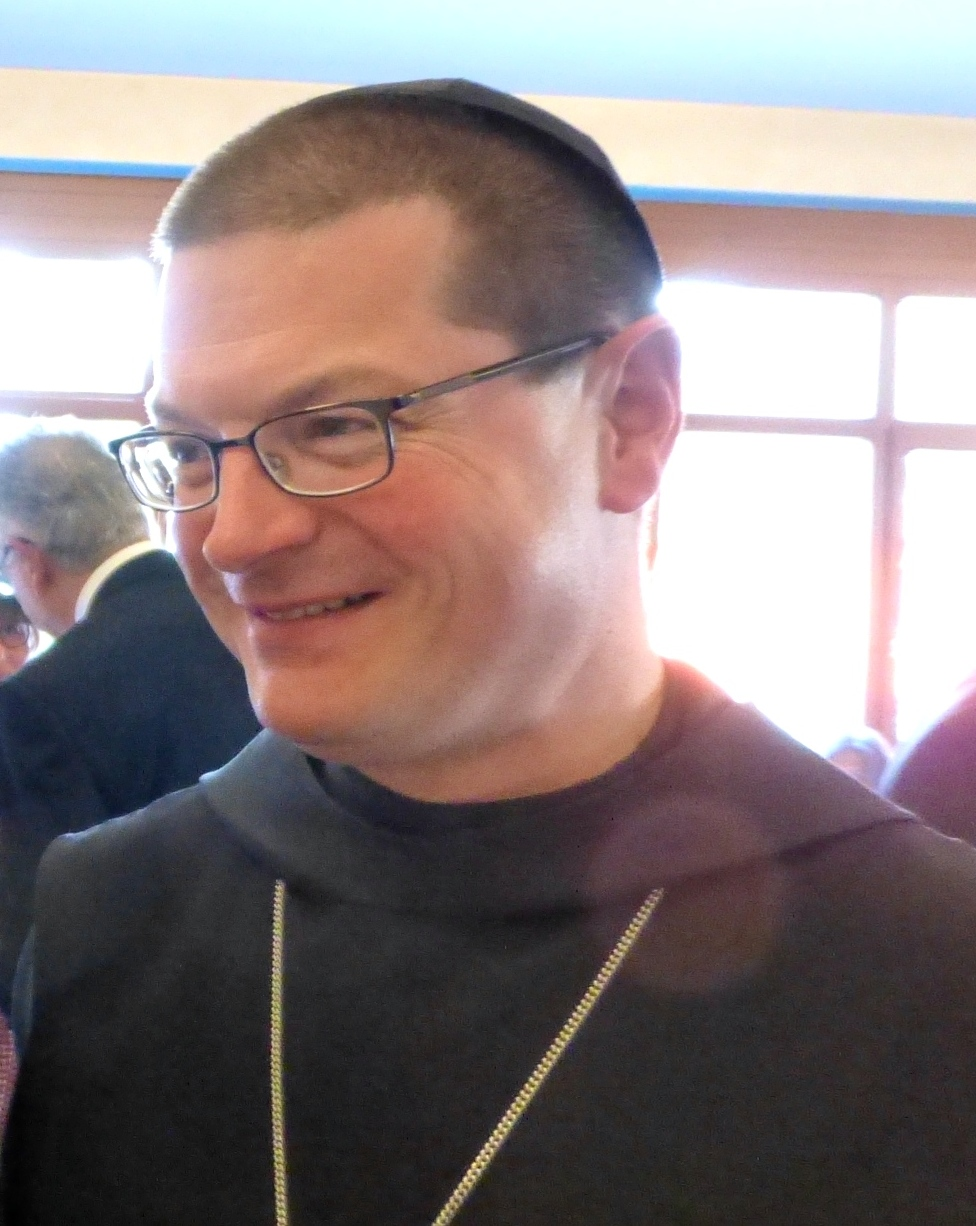
Tutilo Burger
