= Schott (surname) =

Schott is a surname. Notable people with the surname include:

- Andreas Schott (1552–1629), Flemish academic, linguist, translator, editor and a Jesuit priest
- Anselm Schott, Benedictine monk and author
- Arthur Carl Victor Schott, German-American artist and naturalist
- Augusto Schott, Argentine footballer
- Basil Schott, Byzantine Catholic archbishop
- Ben Schott, author of Schott's Miscellanies & Schott's Almanac
- Bernhard Schott (1748–1809), German music publisher
- Cécile Schott, the real name of electronic musician Colleen
- Charles Anthony Schott, a German scientist
- Franck Schott, French swimmer
- Freddy Schott (born 2001), German professional golfer
- George Adolphus Schott, (sometimes referenced as George Augustus Schott), English mathematician
- Heinrich Wilhelm Schott, 19th-century botanist
- Helena Schott, birthname of the English actress Helena Cécile Ernstone
- Lawrence Frederik Schott, American Roman Catholic bishop
- Marge Schott, former owner of the Cincinnati Reds
- Nicole Schott, German figure skater
- Otto Schott, German chemist and inventor of borosilicate glass
- Penelope Schott, American poet

Fictional people called Schott:

- Winslow Schott, the usual alter-ego of fictional DC Comics character Toyman
