= Saint Benedict Medal =

Sacramental medal

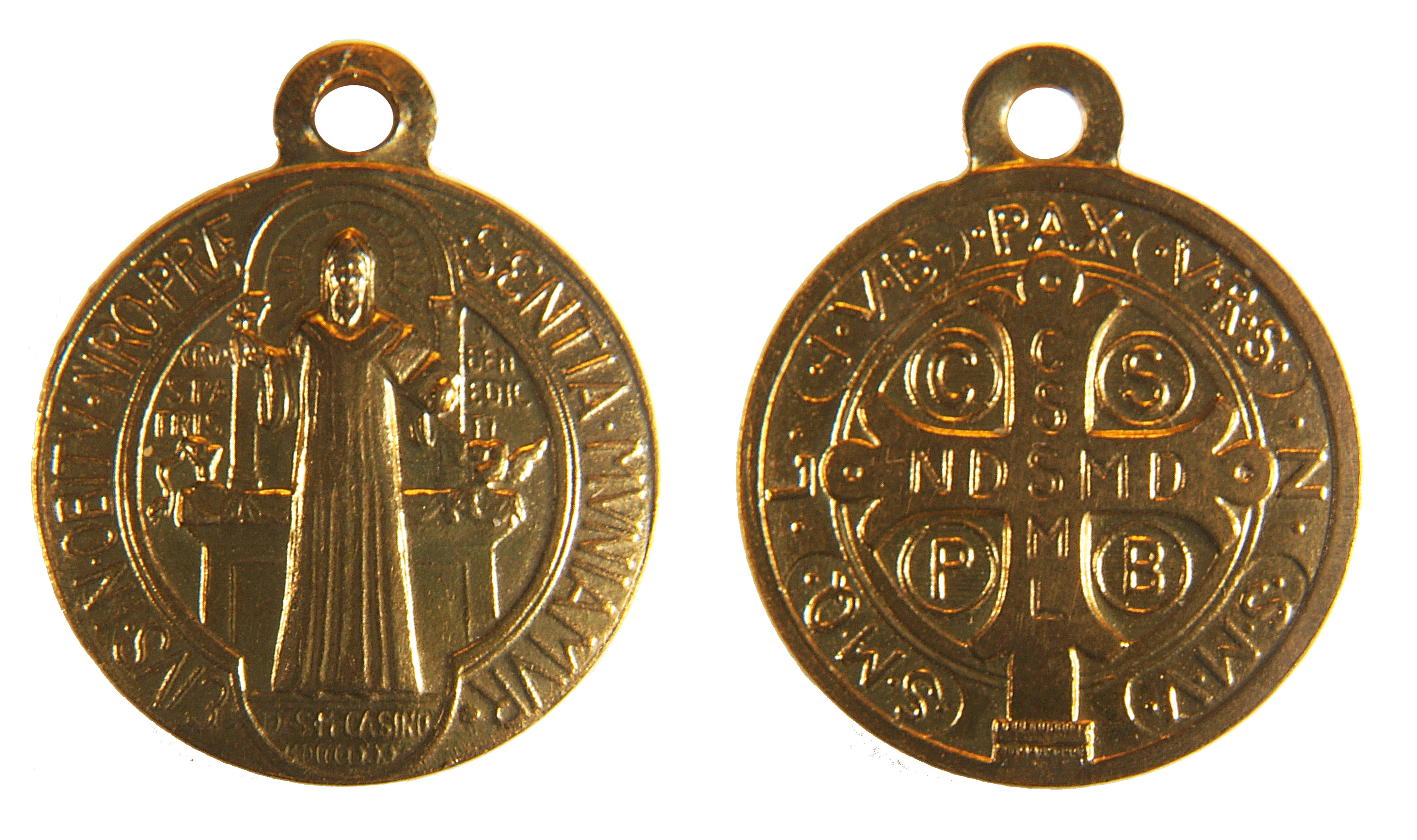
The two sides of a Saint Benedict Medal

The Saint Benedict Medal is a Christian sacramental medal containing symbols and text related to the life of Saint Benedict of Nursia, used by Latin Catholics, Old Catholics, Lutherans, Western Orthodox, Anglicans and Methodists, in the Benedictine Christian tradition, especially votarists and oblates. (Note: The Benedictine monastic tradition is found in all major historic Christian denominations, such as the Abbey of Saint-Joseph de Clairval of the Catholic Church, the Östanbäck Monastery of the Evangelical Lutheran Church of Sweden, the Saint Finian Orthodox Abbey of Western Orthodoxy, the Holy Cross Monastery of the Protestant Episcopal Church in the United States of America, and the Saint Brigid of Kildare Monastery of the United Methodist Church, for example.)

This religious object is also a Christian symbol of opening doors and opening difficult paths. Tradition holds that it protects from curses, evil and vice, protects against diseases and protects good health. Another exorcism medal is the Saint Anthony's cross, associated with Saint Anthony of Egypt, which was adopted by Franciscan orders & the brief of Saint Anthony of Padua which was revealed to a demon-oppressed woman in Portugal.

The reverse side of the Saint Benedict medal carries the Vade retro satana ('Begone, Satan!') Sometimes carried as part of a rosary or embedded in a scapular, it is also worn separately.

== History ==
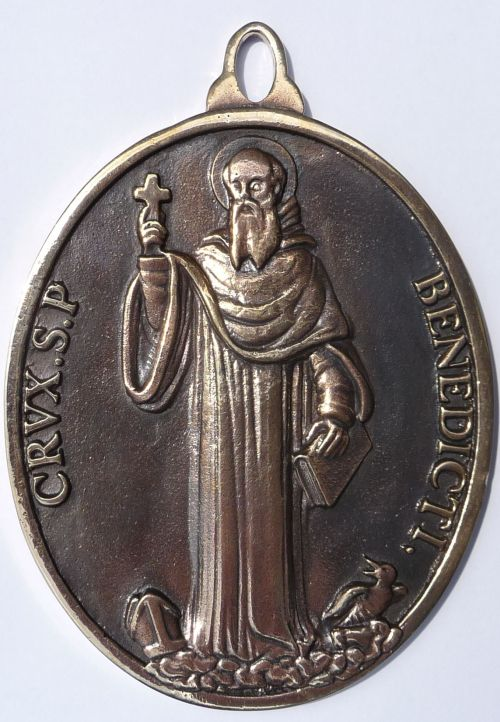
Traditional, original design of the medal

The exact time and date of the making of the first Saint Benedict Medal are not clear. The medal was originally a cross, dedicated to the devotion in honour of St. Benedict. At some point medals were struck that bore the image of St. Benedict holding a cross aloft in his right hand and his Rule for Monasteries in the other hand. Then a sequence of capital letters was placed around the large figure of the cross moline on the reverse side of the medal. The meaning of what the letters signified was lost over time until around 1647 an old manuscript was discovered at the Benedictine St. Michael's Abbey in Metten. In the manuscript, written in 1415, was a picture depicting St. Benedict holding in one hand a staff which ends in a cross, and a scroll in the other.This manuscript, the Mettener Armenbibel (Poor Man's Bible of Metten), survives today as Bayerische Staatsbibliothek, Clm 8201, folio 95r, and has been fully digitized. On the staff and scroll were written in full the words of which the mysterious letters were the initials, a Latin prayer of exorcism against Satan. The manuscript contains the exorcism formula Vade retro satana ('Step back, Satan'), and the letters were found to correspond to this phrase.

The exorcism prayer is found in an early thirteenth century legend of the Devil's Bridge at Sens, wherein an architect sold his soul to the devil and then subsequently repented. M. le Curé of Sens, wearing his stole, exorcised the devil, driving him away with holy water and the words, which he made the penitent repeat.

Medals bearing the image of St. Benedict, a cross moline, and these letters began to be struck in Germany, and soon spread over Europe. Vincent de Paul (†1660) seems to have known of it, for his Daughters of Charity have always worn it attached to their beads, and for many years it was only made, at least in France, for them. The medals were first approved by Benedict XIV on 23 December, 1741, and again on 12 March, 1742. The medal in its traditional design was in use for many decades and is still in use today.

In Gabriel Bucelin's 1679 Benedictus redivivus, he recounts several incidents in which St. Benedict's Medal was viewed as efficacious in addressing illness or some local calamity. In the 1743 Disquisitio sacra numismata, de origine quidditate, virtute, pioque usu Numismatum seu Crucularum S. Benedicti, Abbatis, Viennae Austriae, apud Leopoldum Kaliwoda, Abbot Löbl, of St. Margaret's Monastery of Prague, recommended recourse to the medal as a remedy against bleeding. Prosper Guéranger relates several incidents of religious conversions which he attributes to the intercession of St. Benedict through the pious use of the medal.

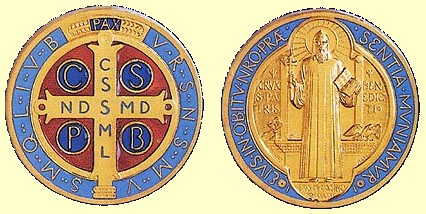
A Jubilee medal by the monk Desiderius Lenz, of the Beuron Art School, made for the 1400th anniversary of the birth of St. Benedict in 1880

The Jubilee medal was struck in 1880, in remembrance of the 1400th anniversary of St. Benedict’s birth. The initials of the Vade retro satana formula have been found on Saint Benedict Medals at least since 1780. The Jubilee medal continues to be the most popular design.

== The medal’s symbolism ==
On the front is a cross, containing the letters C S S M L - N D S M D, initials of the words Crux sacra sit mihi lux! Non draco sit mihi dux! ('May the holy cross be my light! May the dragon never be my overlord!'). The large C S P B stand for Crux Sancti Patris Benedicti ('The Cross of [our] Holy Father Benedict'). Surrounding the back of the medal are the letters V R S N S M V - S M Q L I V B, in reference to Vade retro satana: Vade retro Satana! Nunquam suade mihi vana! Sunt mala quae libas. Ipse venena bibas! ('Begone Satan! Never tempt me with your vanities! What you offer me is evil. Drink the poison yourself!') and finally, located at the top is the word PAX which means 'peace'.

Saint Benedict Medal, obverse side

Latin Abbreviation	Latin Text	English Text	Location
PAX	PAX	Peace	Top
C S P B	Crux Sancti Patris Benedicti	The Cross of [our] Holy Father Benedict	Four quadrants made by centre cross
C S S M L	Crux Sacra Sit Mihi Lux!	May the holy cross be my light!	Center cross, vertical bar
N D S M D	Non [Nunquam] Draco Sit Mihi Dux!	"May the dragon never be my overlord!" "Let the devil not be my leader."	Center cross, horizontal bar
V R S	Vade Retro Satana!	"Begone satan!" "Step back satan"	Clockwise around disk
N S M V	Nunquam Suade Mihi Vana!	"Never tempt me with your vanities!" "Don't persuade me of wicked things."	Clockwise around disk
S M Q L	Sunt Mala Quae Libas.	"What you offer me is evil." "What you are showing me is bad."	Clockwise around disk
I V B	Ipse Venena Bibas!	"Drink the poison yourself!" "Drink your poisons yourself."	Clockwise around disk

Saint Benedict Medal, reverse side

On the back of the medal is Saint Benedict holding a cross in his right hand, the Christian symbol of salvation, and in the left his Rule for Monasteries. To Benedict's right, below the cross, is a poisoned cup, a reference to the legend that hostile monks attempted to poison him, and the cup containing poisoned wine shattered when the saint made the sign of the cross over it. To his left, below the rule, the raven that carried off a loaf of poisoned bread. From this is derived the tradition that the medal protects against poisoning.

Above the cup and raven are the words Crux sancti patris Benedicti ('The Cross of [our] Holy Father Benedict'). Surrounding the figure of Saint Benedict are the words Eius in obitu nostro praesentia muniamur! ('May we be strengthened by his presence in the hour of our death'), since Benedictines regarded him as a particular patron of a happy death. Below the icon of St. Benedict, it is written 'EX SM Casino, MDCCCLXXX' and it means 'Found out from the holy Casino mountain in 1880.'

== Use of the medal ==
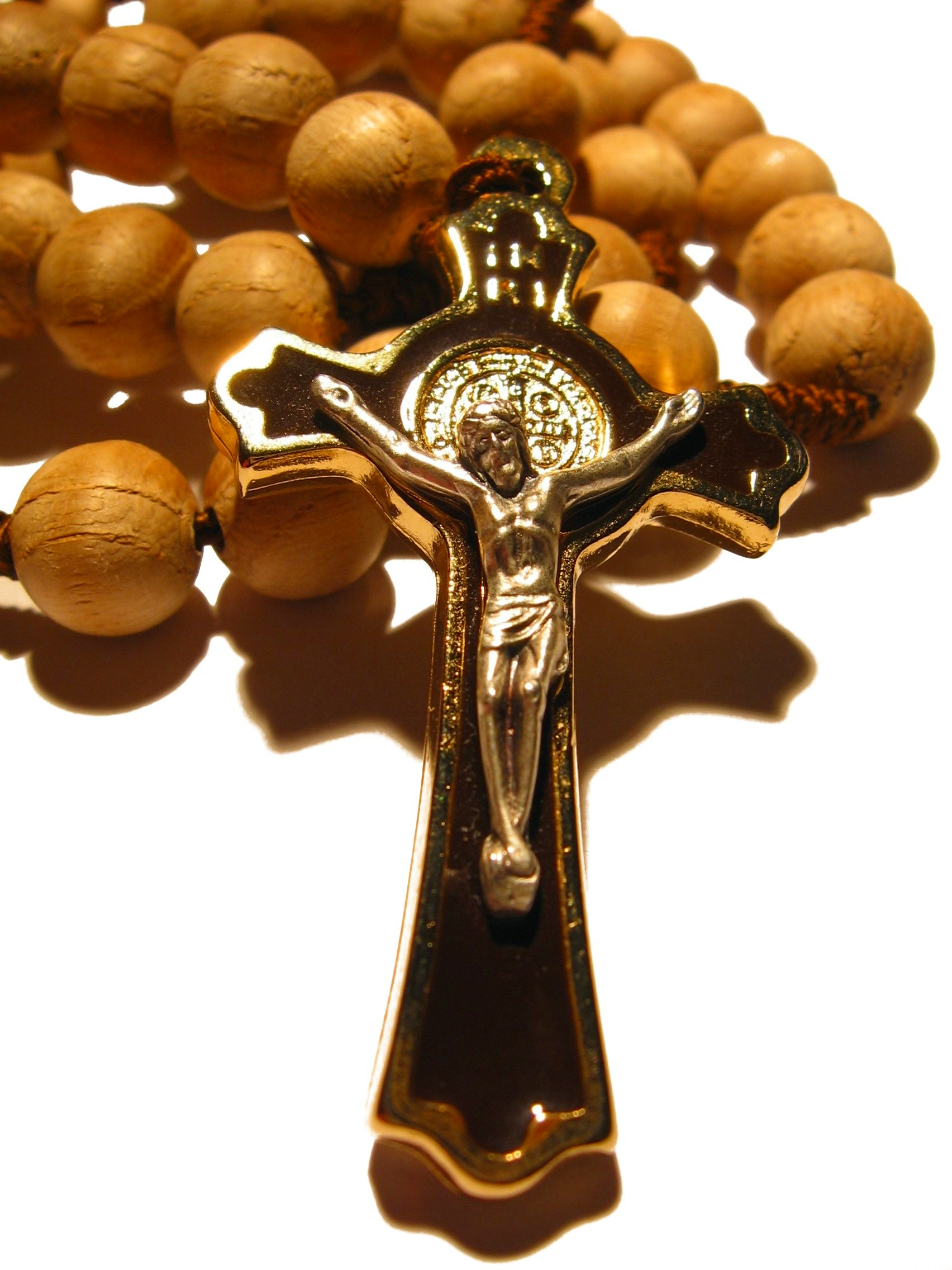
A Dominican rosary with a St. Benedict's Cross attached

The medal represents a prayer on the part of the user to invoke God’s blessing and protection through the intercession of St. Benedict. There are no special rules prescribed for its use. It may be worn on a chain around the neck, carried on one's person, placed in one’s vehicle, home, or in one’s place of business. It is sometimes incorporated into a crucifix to create a "St. Benedict's Cross", usually with the obverse side as the halo for the corpus.

Lay Oblates of St. Benedict are permitted to wear the Medal of St. Benedict instead of the small black cloth scapular.

The Blessing of St. Maur is customarily bestowed on the sick using a relic of the True Cross, in hopes of assisting speedy recovery of their health. Since it is often impossible to have a relic of the True Cross, the Sacred Congregation of Rites in 1959 granted permission for St. Benedict Medals to be used instead of the relic of the True Cross to confer the Blessing.

As with a number of other religious articles, "The faithful, who devoutly use an article of devotion (crucifix or cross, rosary, scapular or medal) properly blessed by any priest, obtain a partial indulgence."

== Blessing of the medal ==
Medals of Saint Benedict are sacramentals that may be blessed legitimately by any priest or deacon, not necessarily a Benedictine.

The following English form may be used:

V: Our help is in the name of the Lord.

R: Who made heaven and earth.

V: In the name of God the Father + almighty, who made heaven and earth, the seas and all that is in them, I exorcise these medals against the power and attacks of the evil one. May all who use these medals devoutly be blessed with health of soul and body. In the name of the Father + almighty, of the Son + Jesus Christ our Lord, and of the Holy + Spirit the Paraclete, and in the love of the same Lord Jesus Christ who will come on the last day to judge the living and the dead, and the world by fire.

R: Amen.

V: Let us pray. Almighty God, the boundless source of all good things, we humbly ask that, through the intercession of Saint Benedict, you pour out your blessings + upon these medals. May those who use them devoutly and earnestly strive to perform good works be blessed by you with the health of soul and body, the grace of a holy life, and remission of the temporal punishment due to sin.

May they also with the help of your merciful love, resist the temptation of the evil one and strive to exercise true charity and justice toward all, so that one day they may appear sinless and holy in your sight. This we ask through Christ our Lord.

R: Amen.

The medal is then sprinkled with holy water.

== See also ==
- Exorcism in Christianity
- Fivefold Scapular
- Miraculous Medal
