= Metten Abbey =

Monastery in Bavaria, Germany

Coordinates: 48°51′19″N 12°55′04″E

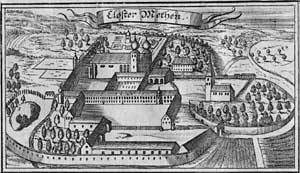
Engraving of Metten Abbey from the "Churbaierisches Atlas" of Anton Wilhelm Ertl, 1687

Metten Abbey, or St. Michael's Abbey at Metten (in German Abtei Metten or Kloster Metten) is a house of the Benedictine Order in Metten near Deggendorf, situated between the fringes of the Bavarian Forest and the valley of the Danube, in Bavaria in Germany, and currently belongs to the Bavarian Congregation.

== History ==
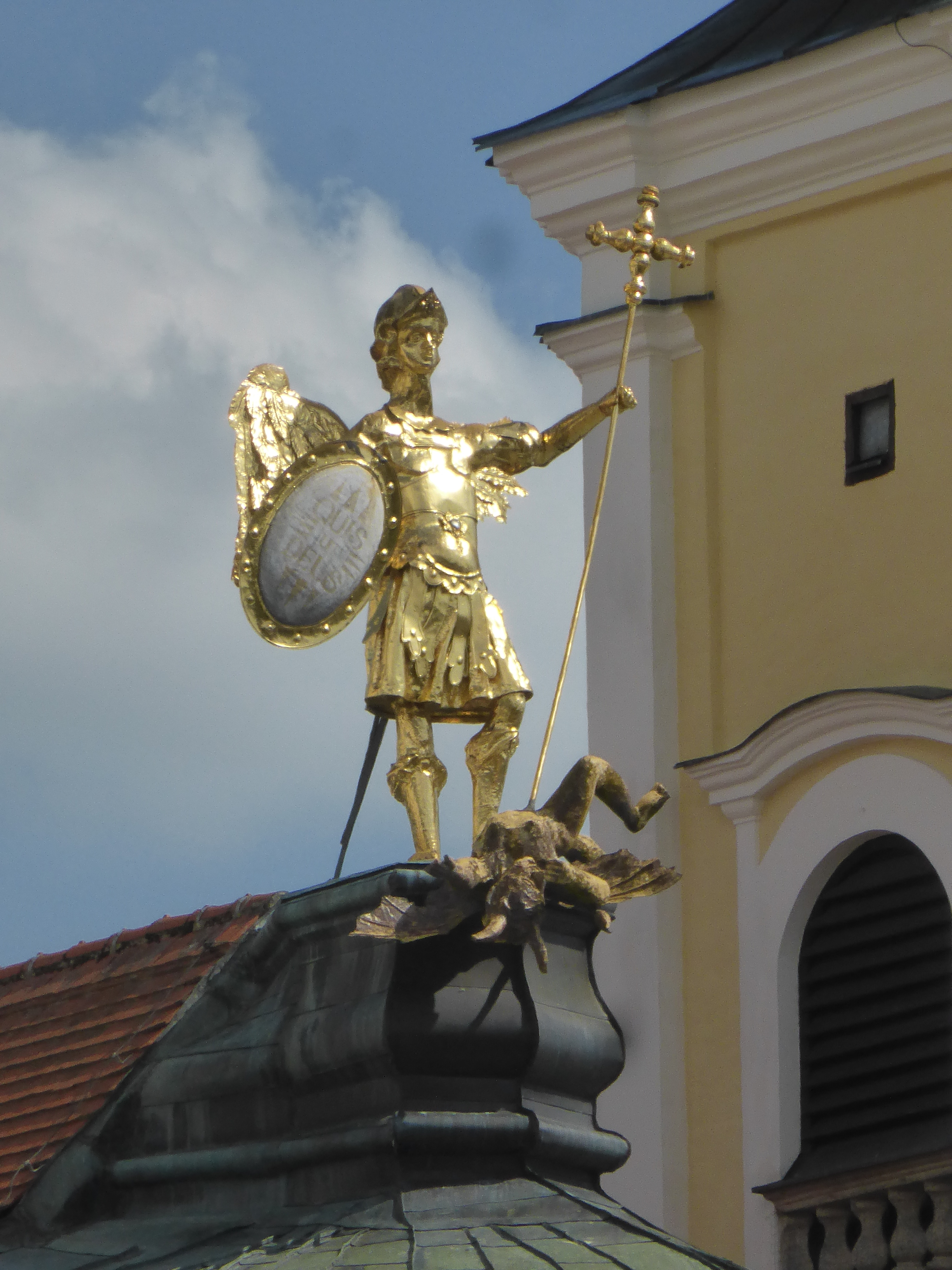
Erzengel Michael, Kloster Metten

Founded around 766 by Gamelbert of Michaelsbuch, the Benediktiner Abtei Metten (Benedictine Metten Abbey) is one of the oldest abbeys in Bavaria. For many centuries Metten was under the lordship of the Dukes and Electors of Bavaria. When Charlemagne stayed in Regensburg for three years after 788, the hermit Utto turned his abbey over to the Frankish ruler, making the Ducal Abbey a Royal Abbey. After the Carolingians became extinct, Metten was turned into an Imperial Abbey. Besides the work of land clearance in the Bavarian border territories, the monks were very active in education. Members of the abbey were not only schoolteachers, but also members of the Bavarian Academy of Science in Munich and professors of philosophy and theology in Freising and Salzburg. Gerhard, Bishop of Passau was abbot in the 10th century.

After secularisation in 1803 the abbey's property was confiscated, and by 1815 had all been auctioned off. Over a number of years Johann von Pronath acquired the greater part of the former premises and succeeded in persuading King Ludwig I of Bavaria in 1830 to re-establish the monastery, which by 1837 had been set up to incorporate a boarding school (Gymnasium), in continuance of its educational traditions, which the monastery has run to this day.

The re-founded abbey was very active in re-settling new monasteries. In 1846 Boniface Wimmer left from Metten to establish the Benedictines in the United States and founded Saint Vincent Archabbey in Latrobe, Pennsylvania. Monks from Latrobe in turn founded Saint John's Abbey in Minnesota, and the adjoining Saint John's University. Since 1858 Metten has been a member of the Bavarian Congregation of the Benedictine Confederation.

During World War II, more than 1,000 refugees from the East found shelter at Metten, located just 30 miles from the Czechoslovak border. Abbot Corbinian Hofmeister was a member of the German resistance.

"The last days of the war saw heavy fighting for the nearby bridges on the Danube, where SS troops held out against approaching U.S. forces. Elsewhere, an advance of combat forces was usually preceded by bombing, but none took place at Metten. Instead, American tank units spearheaded the attack, sparing the townspeople as well as the monastery from great destruction. Years later, the brothers at Metten learned that among the staff officers of the United States army unit that had marched into Metten were some who had studied at St. Vincent and St. John."

Besides the boarding school, the abbey runs various craft enterprises.

Dom Edmund Beck, a monk of Metten, edited many of the Syriac works of Saint Ephrem the Syrian in the Corpus Scriptorum Christianorum Orientalium.

Paul Augustin Mayer was abbot in 1966. Having served as Prefect of the Congregation for Divine Worship and the Discipline of the Sacraments, he was made cardinal in 1985.

== School ==
Like many Benedictine abbeys in Europe, the monks ran a school for local boys. St.-Michaels-Gymnasium is a state recognised coeducational day and boarding school still run by the abbey. It is a Humanistisches ("humanist") and Neusprachliches ("languages") gymnasium, meaning that its curriculum specialises in the classics and modern languages. Notable alumni include educationist Aloys Fischer, diplomat Karl von Spreti, and prelate Karl-Josef Cardinal Rauber.

== Library ==
The original library was established in the 1260s and was expanded over the years. The present library was constructed between 1722 and 1726 in the Baroque style by Abbot Roman II Märkl. At the time of secularization, many of the books were sent to municipal and university libraries. The library was used to store grain. Upon the abbey's reestablishment, some were returned; others were donated from estates or closed monasteries. Because so many monastic libraries had been confiscated, the monks found old manuscripts and early printed books on the market at reasonable prices.

A 1415 manuscript found in the abbey's library helped identify the meaning of the abbreviations for the Vade retro satana (Step back Satan) formula that appears on Saint Benedict Medals. The library, which is open for tours, contains over 150,000 volumes on theology, philosophy and history, including a 1434 illuminated volume of Gregorian chant hand-written on sheepskin parchment.

== Gallery ==
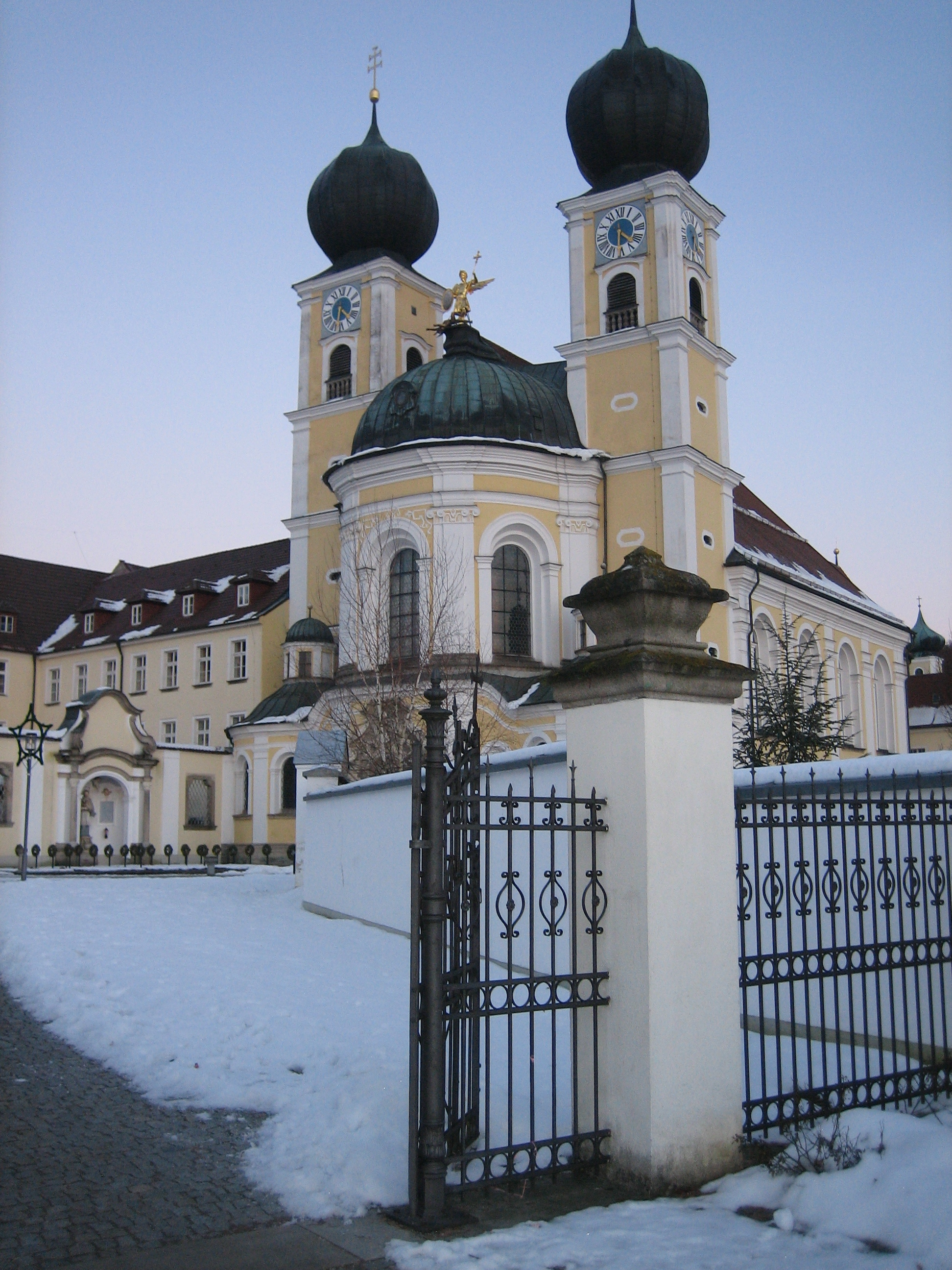
View of the abbey church from Metten marketplace

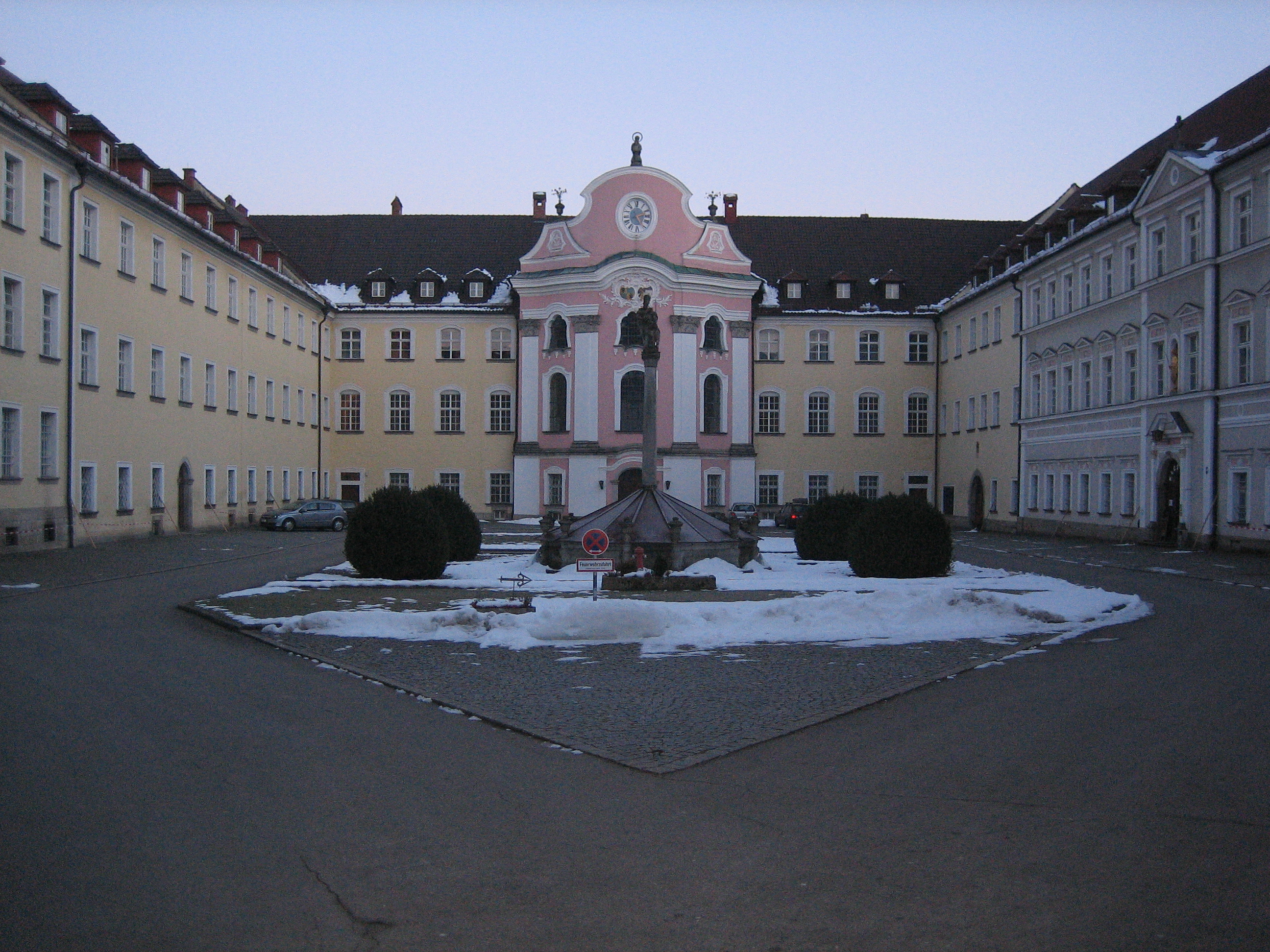
Court of Abbey

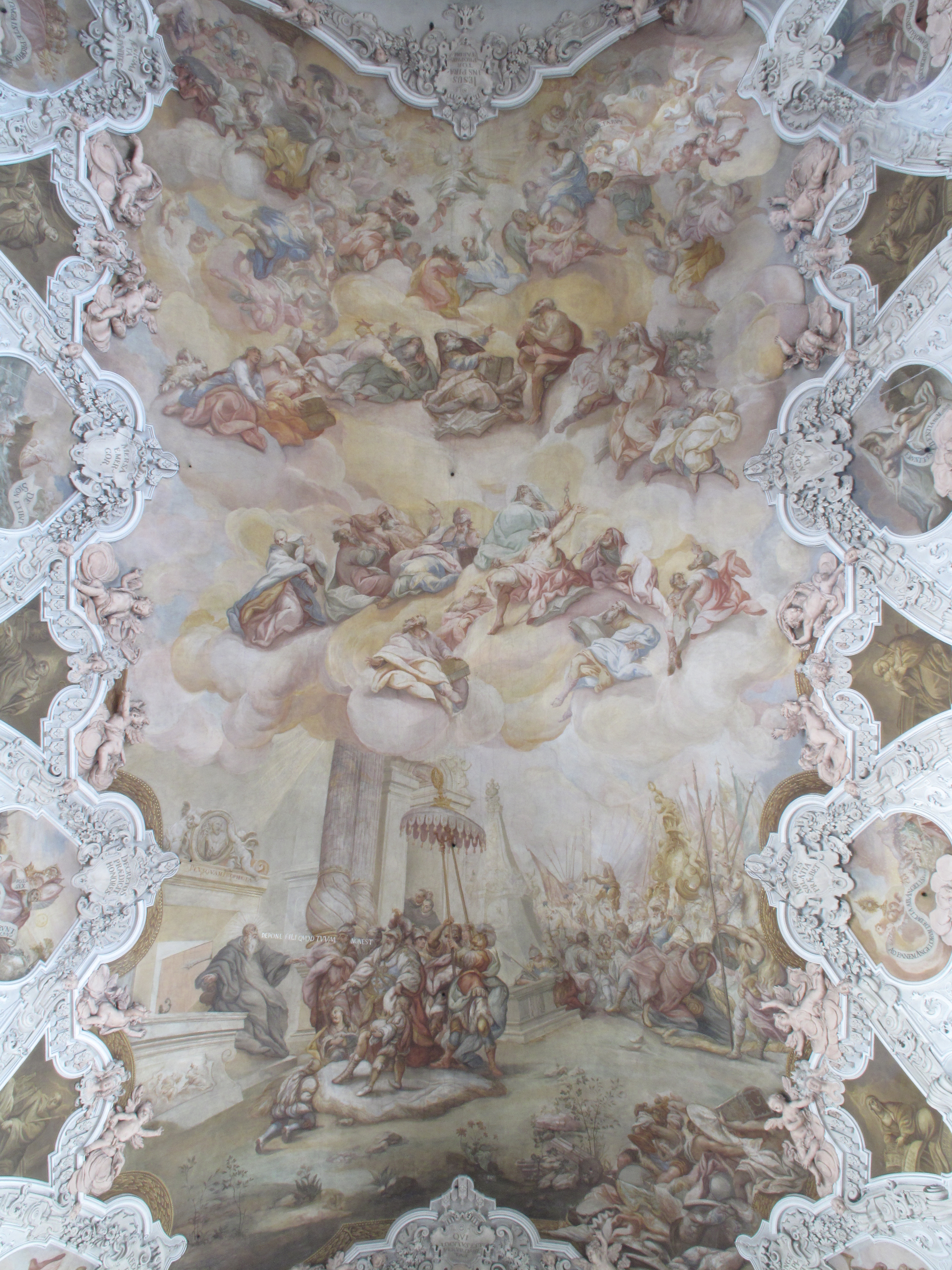
Ceiling fresco

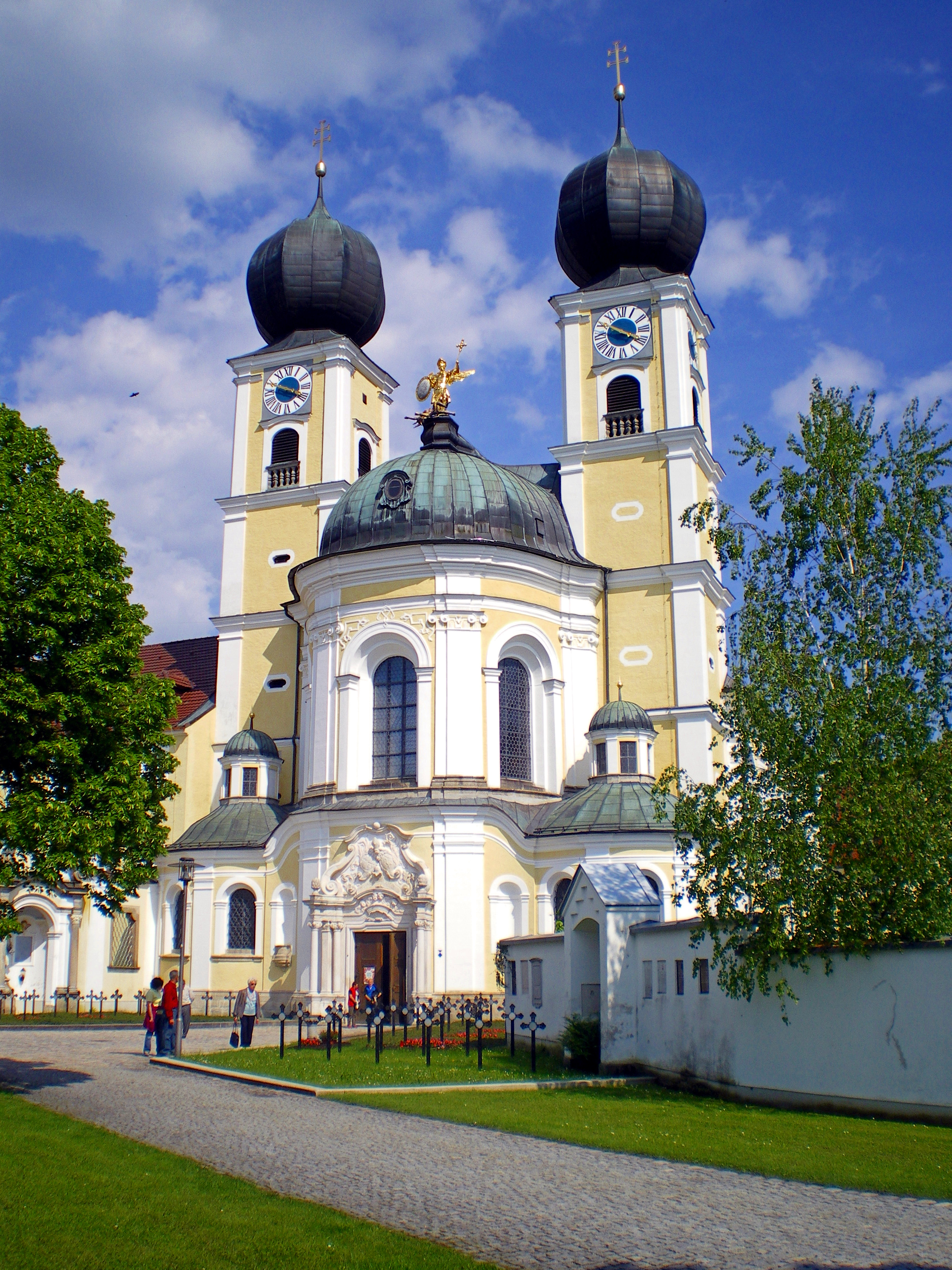
Abbey church
