= Markus Schuler =

German footballer

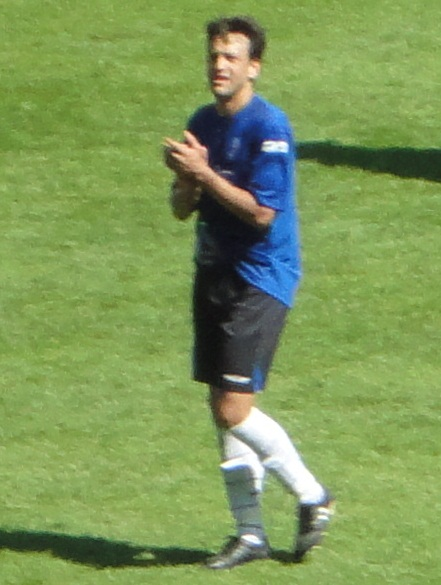
- Schuler with Arminia Bielefeld in 2011

Personal information
- Date of birth: 1 August 1977 (age 49)
- Place of birth: Löffingen, West Germany
- Height: 1.83 m (6 ft 0 in)
- Position: Left back

Youth career
- FC Löffingen
- FC Neustadt
- FV Donaueschingen

Senior career*
Years	Team	Apps	(Gls)
1998–2000	Fortuna Köln	31	(2)
2000–2002	Mainz 05	57	(1)
2002–2004	Hannover 96	39	(0)
2004–2012	Arminia Bielefeld	203	(0)
Total		330	(3)
- * Club domestic league appearances and goals

Markus Schuler (born 1 August 1977) is a German former professional footballer who played as left back.

== Career ==
Born in Löffingen, Schuler began playing youth football at SV Feldberg and FC Löffingen. He played senior football with regional league clubs FC Neustadt and FV Donaueschingen before joining 2. Bundesliga side Fortuna Köln in 1998. After Fortuna were relegated in 2000, Schuler moved to Mainz 05 where manager Jürgen Klopp converted him from a winger to fullback. In 2002, Schuler joined newly promoted Hannover 96 where he would make his Bundesliga debut. In total, Schuler would play in 182 Bundesliga matches for Hannover and Arminia Bielefeld. In 2009, Schuler set the record for most Bundesliga matches played without scoring a goal. Schuler ended his playing career with Arminia, with the club suffering relegations to the 2. and 3. Bundesliga during his latter seasons.
