= Desiderius Lenz =

German sculptor (1832–1928)

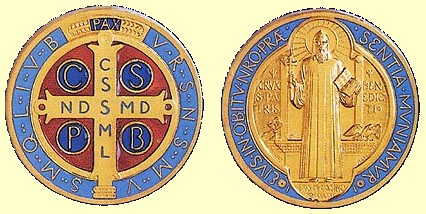
A Jubilee St. Benedict Medal by Desiderius Lenz, made for the 1400th anniversary of the birth of St. Benedict in 1880

Peter Lenz (1832–1928), afterwards Desiderius Lenz, was a German artist who became a Benedictine monk. Together with Gabriel Wüger, he founded the Beuron Art School.

== Background ==
Peter Lenz was born in 1832 in Haigerloch, Baden-Württemberg. From 1849 he studied at the Academy of Fine Arts, Munich as a pupil of the painter and sculptor Max von Widnmann and the muralist Wilhelm von Kaulbach, where he learnt about ancient Greek art, medieval German painting and artists of the Italian Renaissance. In 1851 he joined the Union of Artist Pupils at the Academy, and met Jakob Wüger. Although of differing characters, the two became friends and worked together.

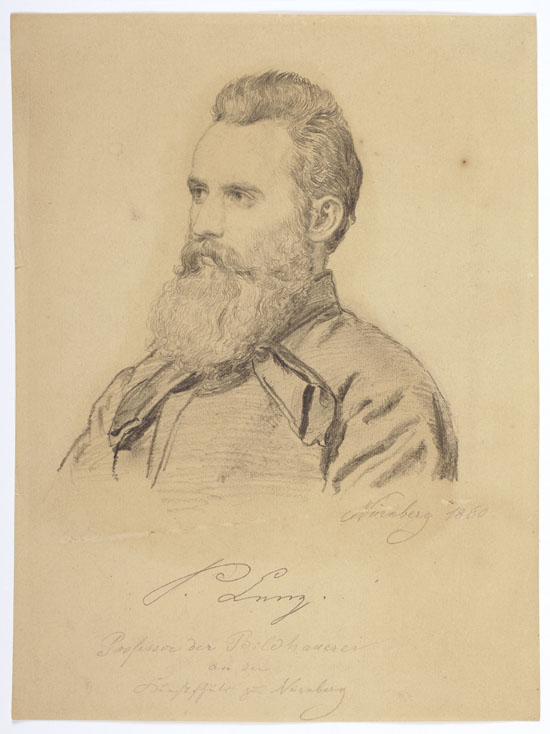
A pencil portrait of Desiderius Lenz (then Peter Lenz) in 1860 by Gabriel Wüger (then Jakob Wüger).

Peter von Cornelius was a significant figure in Lenz's artistic development, and promoted his career. Cornelius had engaged in the Nazarene Brotherhood or Lukasbund at Rome between 1811 and 1819, where he worked with Friedrich Wilhelm Schadow, a Lutheran convert to Roman Catholicism and founder of the Düsseldorf school of painting. Schadow taught that the spiritual life of the artist must be invested in the truths of Christian art. Cornelius was Director of the Munich Academy c.1825-40, and exercised a powerful influence there from which Lenz and Wüger benefited.

After working in Meiningen in 1855-56, and then back in Munich as an independent sculptor, in 1859 Lenz became Professor of Sculpture at the School of Applied Art in Nuremberg. Not long afterwards, on the recommendation of Cornelius, he received a grant to work in Italy. In 1863 he went to Rome with Jakob Wüger and his pupil Fridolin Steiner to work with artists of the Nazarene movement.

== Search for religious principles ==
Lenz deplored the fact that modern art had lost direction, no longer valued naturalist representation, and seemed prey to artists' random individual preferences. Studying the work of the early Christian and Byzantine artists, and of Giotto, taught him that geometry and the arrangement of parts were essential factors for his plans. He set out to discover the principles and rules of proportion.

Investigation of Greek vase painting led him to the work of the archaeologist Lepsius concerning the construction and ornamentation of Egyptian temples. These principles guided his later work.

== Beuron ==
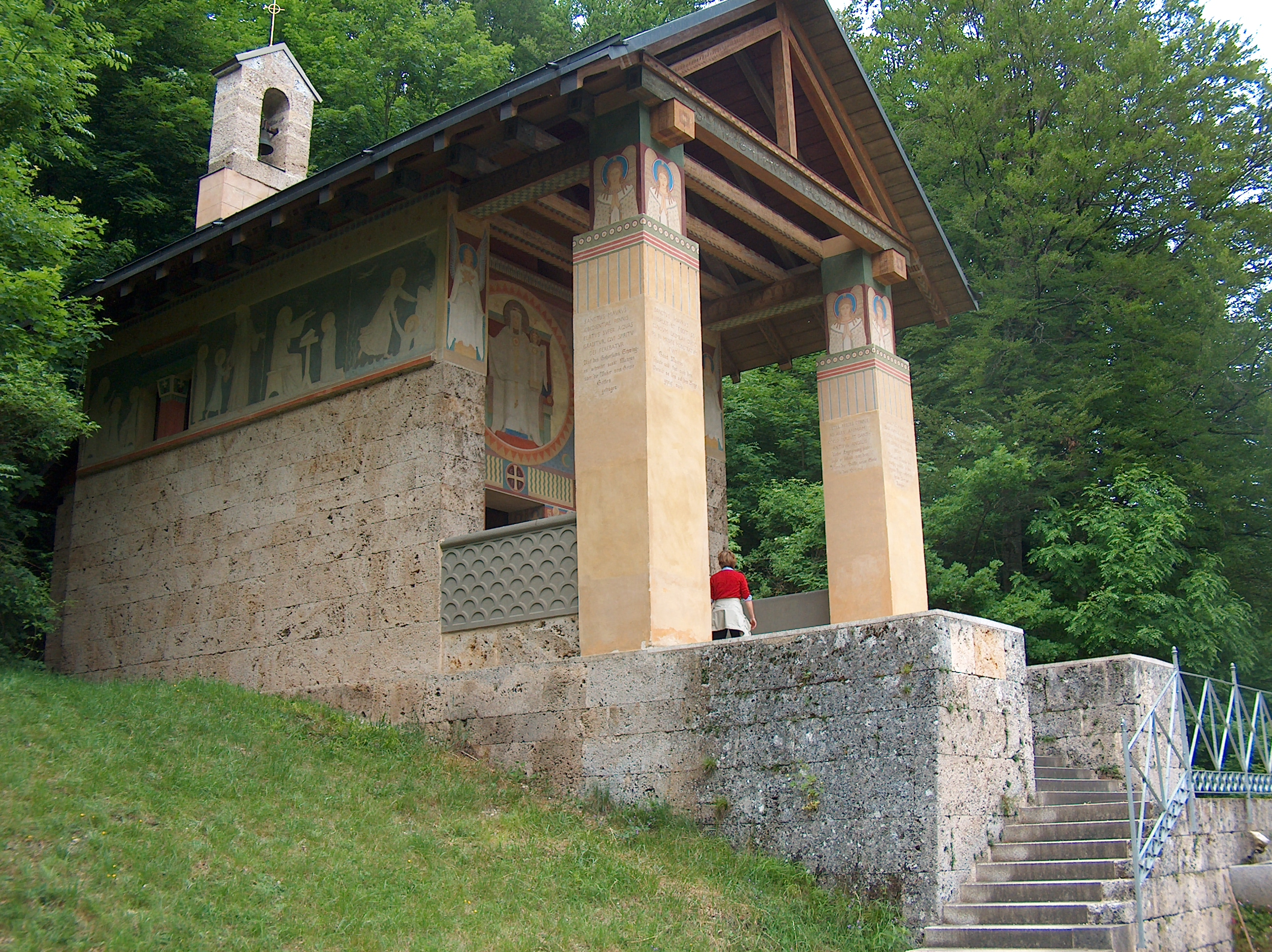
The Chapel of St Maurus at Beuron, constructed 1868-1871, an iconic project for the Beuron School.

Although Wüger was of a Calvinist background both he and the more idealistic Lenz moved to the belief that artists should work together in a Catholic community to produce sacred art suitable for the devotional and liturgical environment. Around 1866 a plan for an 'Ideal Church' was produced, and in 1868 they met Maurus Wolter, the first abbot of the Benedictine Archabbey of Beuron founded in 1863 under the patronage of Princess Katherina von Hohenzollern. Wolter was already engaged in the revival of Gregorian chant, after the model of Solesmes Abbey, and also wished his abbey to play its part in the revival of religious art.

Lenz first visited the Archabbey of Beuron in January 1868, aged 36, drawn by the community's liturgy and monastic observance. The Princess of Hohenzollern had promised to endow a chapel to St Maurus (the original disciple of St Benedict) and Lenz, having explained his artistic aims, produced a plan for it which was accepted and built. Returning to Rome to obtain Wüger's involvement, the sketches for the painting were prepared, and together with Fridolin Steiner they returned to Beuron in May 1869. The work was completed in summer 1871 and the Chapel of St Maurus in the Fields was dedicated in September. Wüger took the monastic habit at Beuron in September 1871 as Brother Gabriel, followed by Steiner as Brother Lukas (the evangelist was an artist) and finally Lenz as Brother Desiderius in 1872.

== Selection of publications ==
- Zur Ästhetik der Beuroner Schule (Vienna 1898). (2nd. Edition, Beuron 1927). Internet archive
- Desiderius Lenz: The Aesthetic of Beuron, and other writings. Translated from the German by John Minahane and John Connolly. Introduction and Appendix by Hubert Krins. Afterword and notes by Peter Brooke. (Francis Boutle publishers, London 2002). ISBN 0-903427-10-9
- 'Der Kanon', in Benediktinische Monatsschrift 3 (1921), pp. 363–77.
- Festschrift und Festgedichte zum 80. Geburtstage unseres Altreichskanzlers Otto von Bismarck (Heidenheim 1895).

== Sources ==
- Odilo Wolff OSB, 'Beuroner Kunst', in Die Christliche Kunst, Monatschrift für alle Gebiete der Christlichen Kunst, 7th Year 1910-11 (Gesellschaft für Christliche Kunst, Munich), pp. 121–149. Internet archive (German, illustrated).
- Josef Kreitmaier S.J., Beuroner Kunst: eine Ausdrucksform der Christlichen Mystik 4th and 5th Edition (Herder & Co., Freiburg im Breisgau 1923). Internet archive
- Maurus Pfaff (Pater Dr.), O.S.B., P. Desiderius Peter Lenz, der Meister von Beuron 1832 - 1928; Persönlichkeit und Werk (Beuroner Kunstverlag, 1978). (from: Erbe und Auftrag, 54,3).
- Gallus Schwind, P. Desiderius Lenz. Biographische Gedenkblätter zu seinem 100. Geburtstag (Beuron/Hohenzollern 1932).
- Harald Siebenmorgen, Die Anfänge der "Beuroner Kunstschule": Peter Lenz und Jakob Wüger, 1850 - 1875; ein Beitrag zur Genese der Formabstraktion in der Moderne (Thorbecke, Sigmaringen 1983). ISBN 3-7995-5028-3. (Freiburg (Breisgau), Diss., 1979).
- Harald Siebenmorgen, 'Lenz, Peter', in Neue Deutsche Biographie (NDB) Vol. 14 (Duncker & Humblot, Berlin 1985), ISBN 3-428-00195-8, pp. 234 ff. (Digitalized).
- Velten Wagner (Ed.), Avantgardist und Malermönch. Peter Lenz und die Beuroner Kunstschule, Catalogue to the Exhibition 'Avantgardist und Malermönch: Peter Lenz und die Beuroner Kunstschule', Städtisches Museum Engen 2007 (Quensen, Hildesheim 2007). ISBN 978-3-938816-03-5.

== See also ==
- Maurus Wolter
