= Löffingen =

- Town
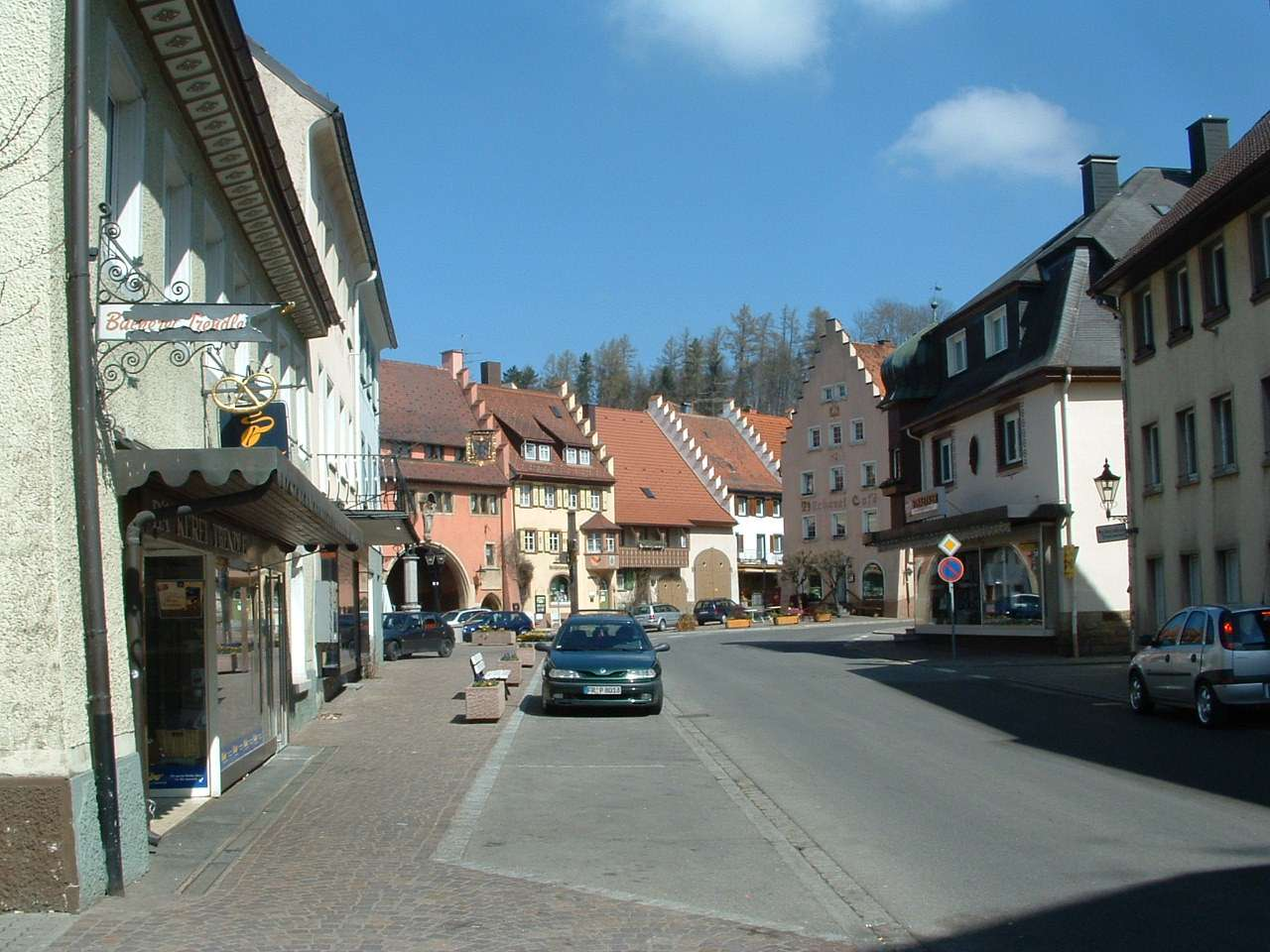
- View from the town

- Coat of arms

- Location of Löffingen within Breisgau-Hochschwarzwald district
- Interactive map of Löffingen
- Location within Germany Location within Baden-Württemberg
- Coordinates: 47°53′2″N 8°20′37″E
- Country: Germany
- State: Baden-Württemberg
- Admin. region: Freiburg
- District: Breisgau-Hochschwarzwald
- Subdivisions: 7

Government
  - Mayor (2021–29): Tobias Link

Area
  - Total: 88.02 km^{2} (33.98 sq mi)
- Elevation: 800 m (2,600 ft)

Population (2025-12-31)
  - Total: 7,589
  - Density: 86.22/km^{2} (223.3/sq mi)
- Time zone: UTC+01:00 (CET)
  - Summer (DST): UTC+02:00 (CEST)
- Postal codes: 79843
- Dialling codes: 07654, 07707 Unadingen
- Vehicle registration: FR
- Website: www.loeffingen.de

Löffingen (German pronunciation: [ˈlœfɪŋən]) is a town in the district Breisgau-Hochschwarzwald, in Baden-Württemberg, Germany. It is situated 14 km southwest of Donaueschingen, and 40 km southeast of Freiburg.

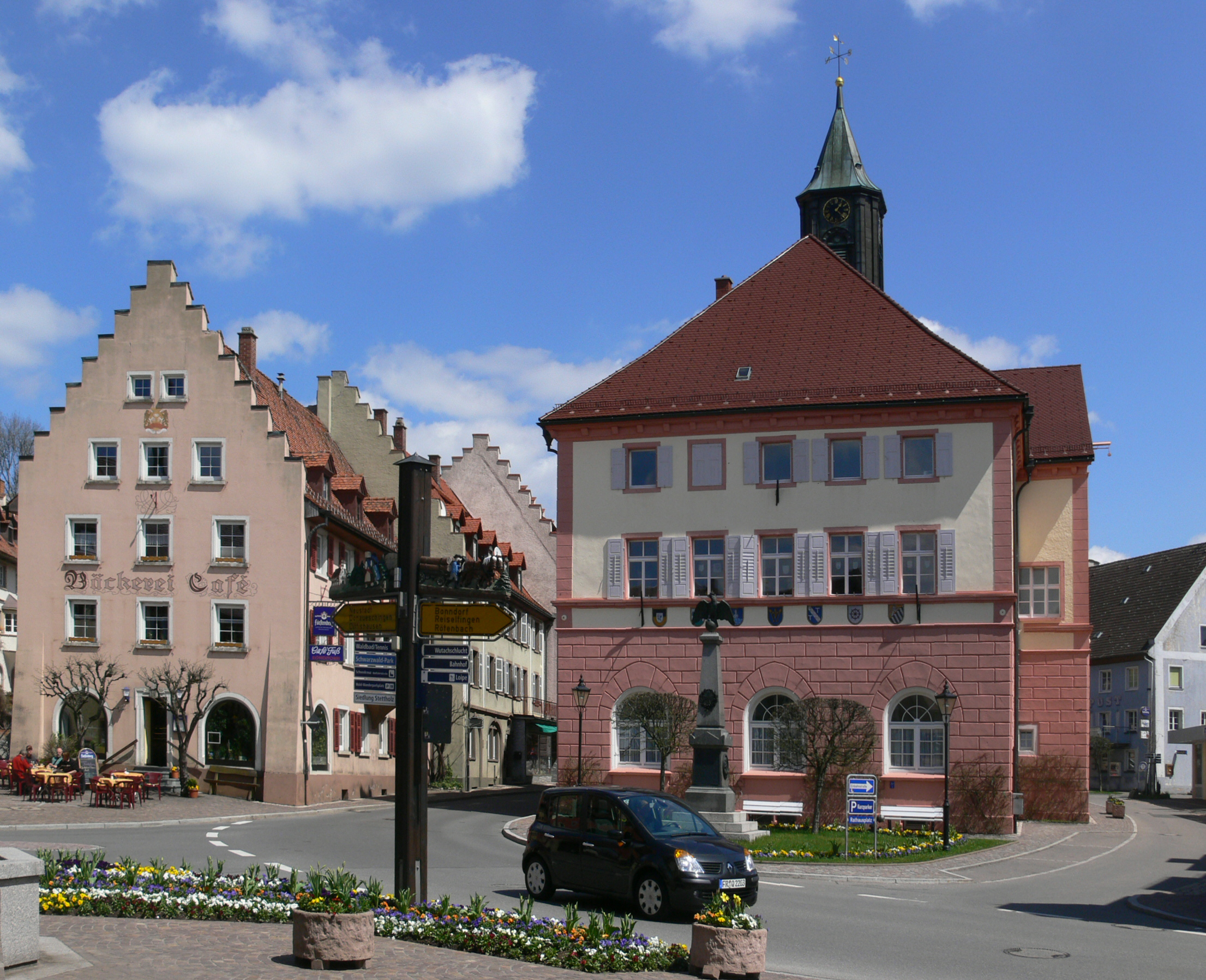
Löffingen Town hall (right)

== Sons and daughters of the town ==
- Wolfgang Zinser (born 1964), former German champion in the triple jump, now an orthopedic doctor,
- Tutilo Burger (born 1965), Benedictine OSB, Archbishop of the Benedictine Abbey in Beuron
- Martin Braun (born 1968), football player and coach
- Martin Wehrle (born 1970), journalist, career advisor and non-fiction author.
- Markus Schuler (born 1977), former footballer, played 203 games for Arminia Bielefeld
