= Gerhard (bishop of Passau) =

14th Bishop of Passau

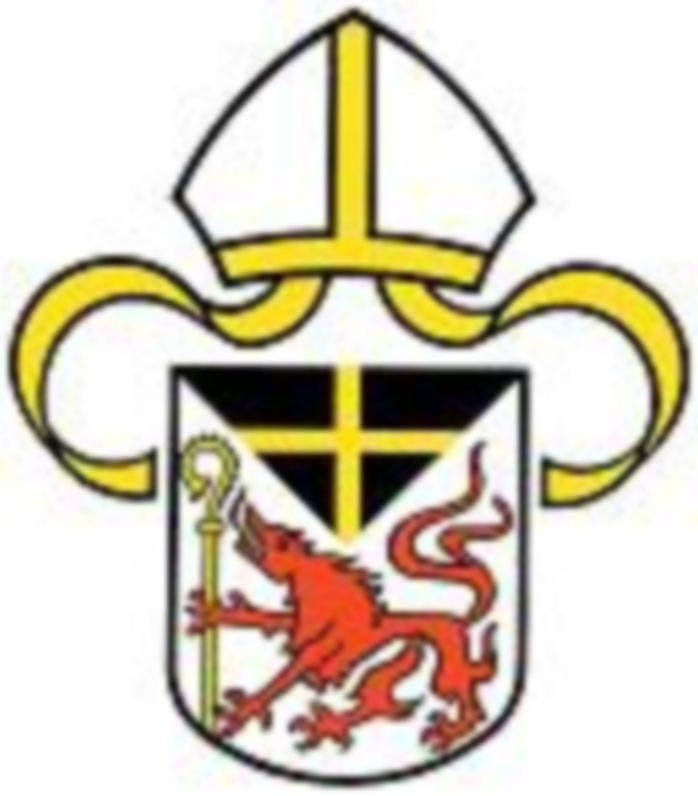
Bistumswappen of Passau.

Gerhard (fl 946) was from 932 to 946 the 14th Bishop of Passau.

Gerhard was perhaps Abbot of Metten, and was probably elevated to Bishop of Passau by Arnulf, Duke of Bavaria. He was regarded as a pious, virtuous, and erudite bishop, whom the annals of Reichersberg called saints.

He probably undertook a trip to Rome in 937. His report of ecclesiastical abuses in Germany led Pope Leo VII to send him back as papal legate, with full powers to restore discipline.
