= Anselm Schott =

Anselm Schott OSB born September 5, 1843, in Staufeneck, municipality of Salach; died April 23, 1896, in Maria Laach, was a German Benedictine monk. His name is associated with a widely used prayer book, reprinted many times since its initial publication in 1884, which presented the most important Catholic liturgical book, the Missal, in German, "adapted for lay use", to be read alongside the Latin liturgy. The name "(the) Schott" became synonymous for the book because of its popularity and has been a trademark since 1928. The book also contained detailed explanatory comments on the liturgical year.

== Life ==
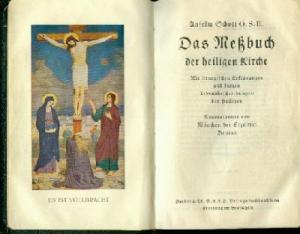
Schott missal of 1952

Friedrich August Schott was born on 5 September 1843 in Staufeneck Castle, as a child of Eduard Schott, a tenant farmer from the Counts of Degenfeld, and his wife Maria Antonia.

After studying Catholic theology in Tübingen and Munich he entered the Rottenburg seminary on 10 October 1866. He was ordained a priest in Rottenburg on 10 August 1867 and worked as a vicar in Biberach an der Riß. In the autumn of 1868 he entered the Archabbey of Beuron, where he took the religious name Anselm. After the novitiate he made his temporary vows in June, 1870 and his solemn vows on Trinity Sunday in 1873. After the Abbey of Beuron was closed down as a result of the Kulturkampf in 1875, Anselm Schott was sent to various other monasteries of the Benedictine order. From 1876 to 1881 he was subprior at Maredsous Abbey near Dinant in Belgium. From 1881 to 1883 he worked at the Emmaus Monastery in Prague and from 1883 to 1891 at the Seckau Abbey in Styria. In 1892 he went to the Maria Laach Abbey, where he died in 1896.

With his missal, Schott wanted to "do a little bit to ensure that the church's rich treasure of prayer, which is laid down in its holy liturgy, becomes more and more accessible and familiar to the faithful". From then on, Schott's missal appeared almost annually, periodically updated, in many editions.
