= Beuron school =

19th-century German art movement

Facade mural showing saints of the Benedictine order by Gabriel Wüger

The Beuron school was an art movement founded by a confederation of Benedictine monks in Germany in the late 19th century.

== Notables ==
In addition to the first abbot of Beuron Archabbey, Maurus Wolter (died 1890), who founded the monastery with his brother Placidus in 1863, the early leaders of the artistic school were Desiderius Lenz (1832–1928) and Gabriel Wüger (1829–1892). Several Benedictine artists worked within the school, including Jan Verkade.

== Principles ==
Beuronese art is principally known for its murals with "muted, tranquil and seemingly mysterious colouring". Though several different principles were in competition to form the canon for the school, "[t]he most significant principle or canon of the Beuronese school is the role which geometry played in determining proportions." Lenz elaborated the philosophy and canon of a new artistic direction, which was based on the elements of ancient Egyptian, Greek, Roman, Byzantine and early Christian art. Some of the other principles that Lenz used to define the Beuronese style include:

- The art speaks to the mind of the viewer. The art is itself worshipful and invites the viewer to worship. It does not stand out boldly of itself but is part of an environment of worship.
- Works are anonymous, done by group effort, and not for the glory of the artist, but of God.
- As in icons, the Beuronese style favors imitation over originality, with freehand copying revealing an artist's true genius.
- There is full integration of art and architecture. Painting and sculpture are not "stick-ons" to an architectural plan but an integral part of it. Beuronese art encompasses painting, architecture, altar vessels, and furnishings.

== Collections ==
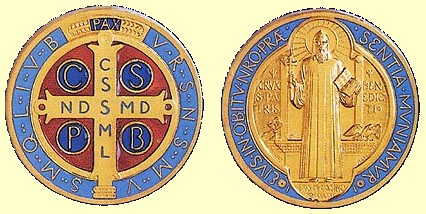
A Jubilee Saint Benedict Medal by Desiderius Lenz, made for the 1400th anniversary of the birth of Saint Benedict in 1880

One of the most complete collections of Beuronese art is located at Conception Abbey in Conception, Missouri, which was founded by Benedictine monks who immigrated to the United States from Engelberg Abbey in Switzerland. According to the abbey's website, "Beuronese art was revolutionary for its time, and also characteristic of its time. It offered a stylized, simplified, and hieratic approach to art which went against the grain of contemporary romantic forms."

A series of murals depicting the Life of the Virgin was created under the direction of Desiderius Lenz, Gabriel Wuger, and Lukas Steiner between 1880 and 1887 for the Benedictine Abbey of Emmaus in Prague. Subsequently destroyed by fire in 1945 during World War II, two copies of this set are still in existence. A set was created for St. Mary's German Church in McKeesport, Pennsylvania, between 1908 and 1910 by the Revs. Bonaventure Ostendorp and Rapheul Pfister of the Order of Saint Benedict at St. Anselm College in Goffstown, New Hampshire. The church was demolished in 1996. However, the Life of the Virgin series was restored and relocated to Our Lady of Fatima Catholic Church in Carnegie, Pennsylvania. A second set of duplicates resides at the abbey church of the Immaculate Conception Benedictine Abbey in Conception, Missouri.

== Legacy ==
Beuronese art has been suggested by several scholars to have had a large influence on the Austrian painter Gustav Klimt. In 1898, shortly after the beginning of the Vienna Secession, Desiderius Lenz had his book published – Zur Aesthetic der Beuroner Schule ("On the Aesthetics of the Beuron School"). It is assumed that Klimt read Lenz's work with enthusiasm, and images of Beuron Abbey, for instance, may show sections of the decorated ceiling which appear to have made quite a direct impact on Klimt's decorative, golden paintings.
