= Gabriel Wüger =

Swiss artist and monk (1829-1893)

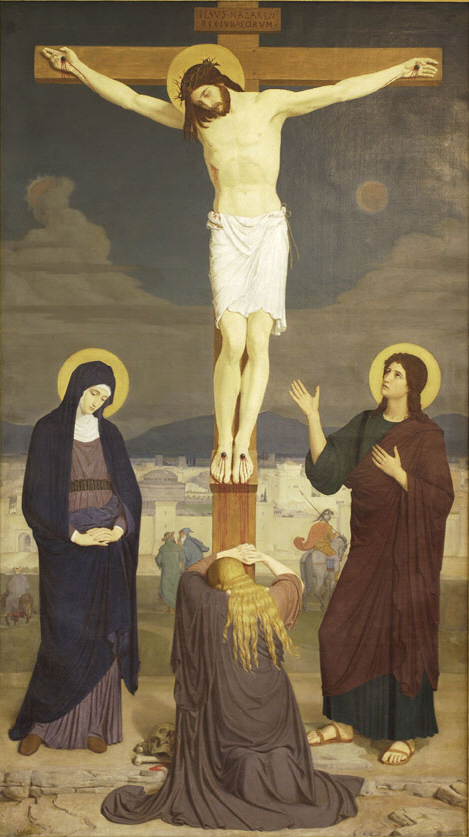
Crucifixion scene by Gabriel Wüger, 1868

Gabriel Wüger (2 December 1829 – 1892) was an artist and a Benedictine monk. He was one of the founders of the Beuron Art School in Germany in the late nineteenth century.

Wüger was born Jakob Wüger on 2 December 1829 in Canton Thurgau in Switzerland.

In 1863 Wüger and two other artists drawn to the Benedictine teaching, Peter Lenz and Fridolin Steiner, travelled to Rome to work with the artists of the Nazarene movement. Like the Nazarenes, these artists who were to become known as the “Beuronese” were in search of natural simplicity and clarity with an emphasis on essentials and conscious neglect of accidentals and details. They chose as their guiding principles the use of plain backgrounds and basic colours, a limited use of perspective and a repetition of decoration.

Lenz and Wüger thought of forming a monastic community of artists. They believed that in order to make sacred art one should lead a Catholic life in community. In 1868 in Rome, they met Maurus Wolter, who had similar artistic aspirations for his young Benedictine monastery at Beuron. Maurus Wolter wanted his monastery to play a role in the revival of Church art just as it was beginning to do in the revival of Gregorian chant (in emulation of Solesmes Abbey).

Lenz was attracted to Beuron because of the abbey’s use of Gregorian chant, which he saw as parallel to his own efforts in art and architecture. He approached Princess Katherina von Hohenzollern, who had promised a chapel there to St Maurus (the disciple of St Benedict), and produced an architectural design for the building which was accepted and built. In September 1868 he went to Rome to recruit Wüger to the task of the painting, and the cartoons having been produced they travelled back to Beuron in May 1869 together with Steiner, Wüger's pupil. The work was completed in summer 1871 and dedicated in September. Wüger took on the robes of the Order at Beuron in September 1871 as Brother Gabriel, followed by Steiner as Brother Lukas and Lenz as Brother Desiderius in 1872.

The original Life of the Virgin series was painted at the Emmaus Abbey in Prague under the direction of Lenz, Wüger, and Steiner between 1880-87.

In his apostolic letter Archicoenobium Casinense in 1913 (on the occasion of the consecration of a crypt chapel at the abbey of Monte Cassino decorated in the style of the Beuron Art School), Pope Pius X likened the artistic efforts of the Benedictines of Beuron to the revival of Gregorian chant by the Benedictines of Solesmes when he wrote, “...together with sacred music, it proves itself to be a powerful aid to the liturgy”.

Wüger died at the monastery of Monte Cassino in 1892.

== See also ==
- Desiderius Lenz
