= Beuron Archabbey =

Archabbey in Beuron, Germany

- Erzabtei Beuron
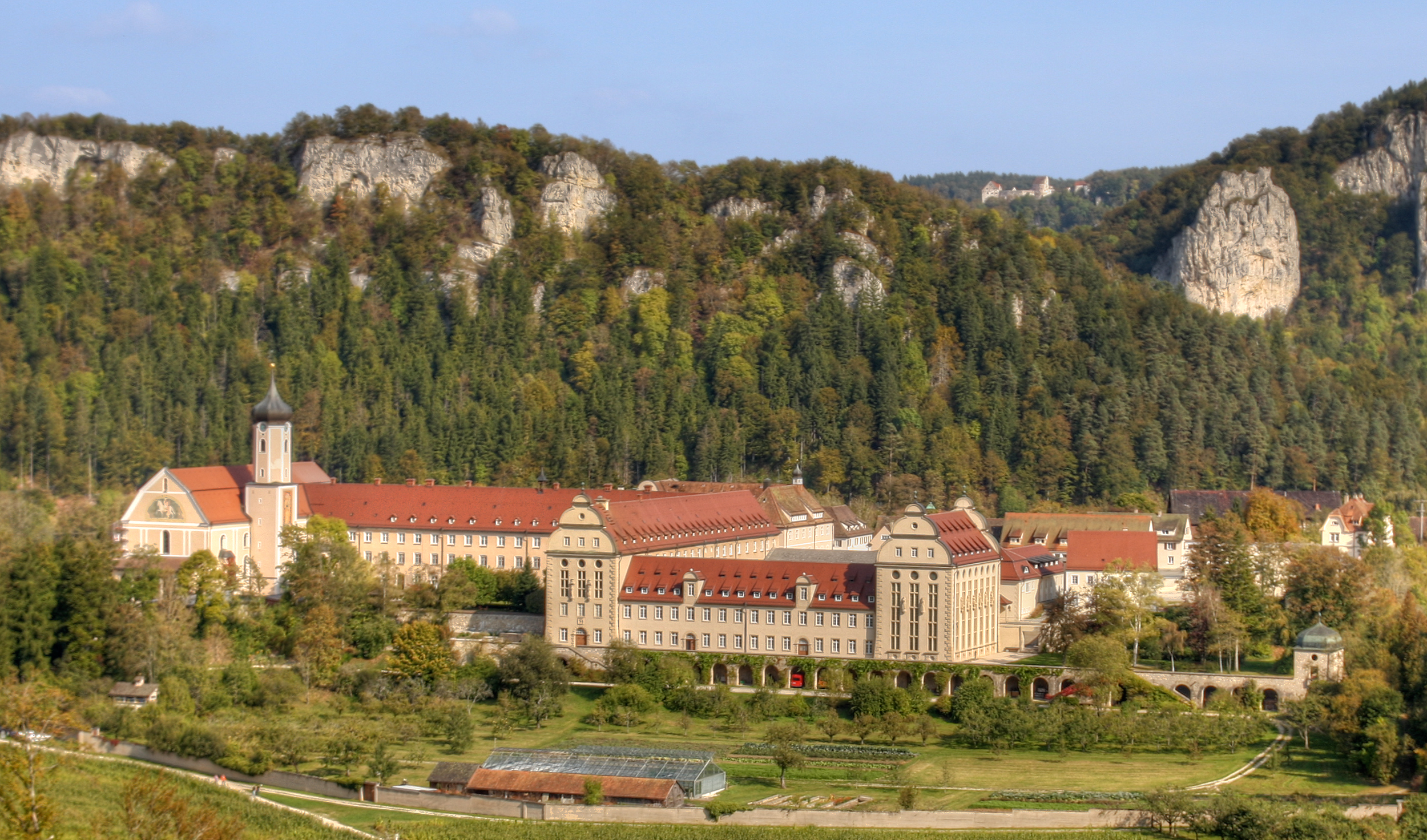
- View of the Archabbey in 2009

- Location within Baden-Württemberg Location within Germany

Religion
- Affiliation: Catholic
- Sect: Benedictines

Location
- Location: Beuron
- Country: Germany
- Coordinates: 48°3′3″N 8°58′9″E

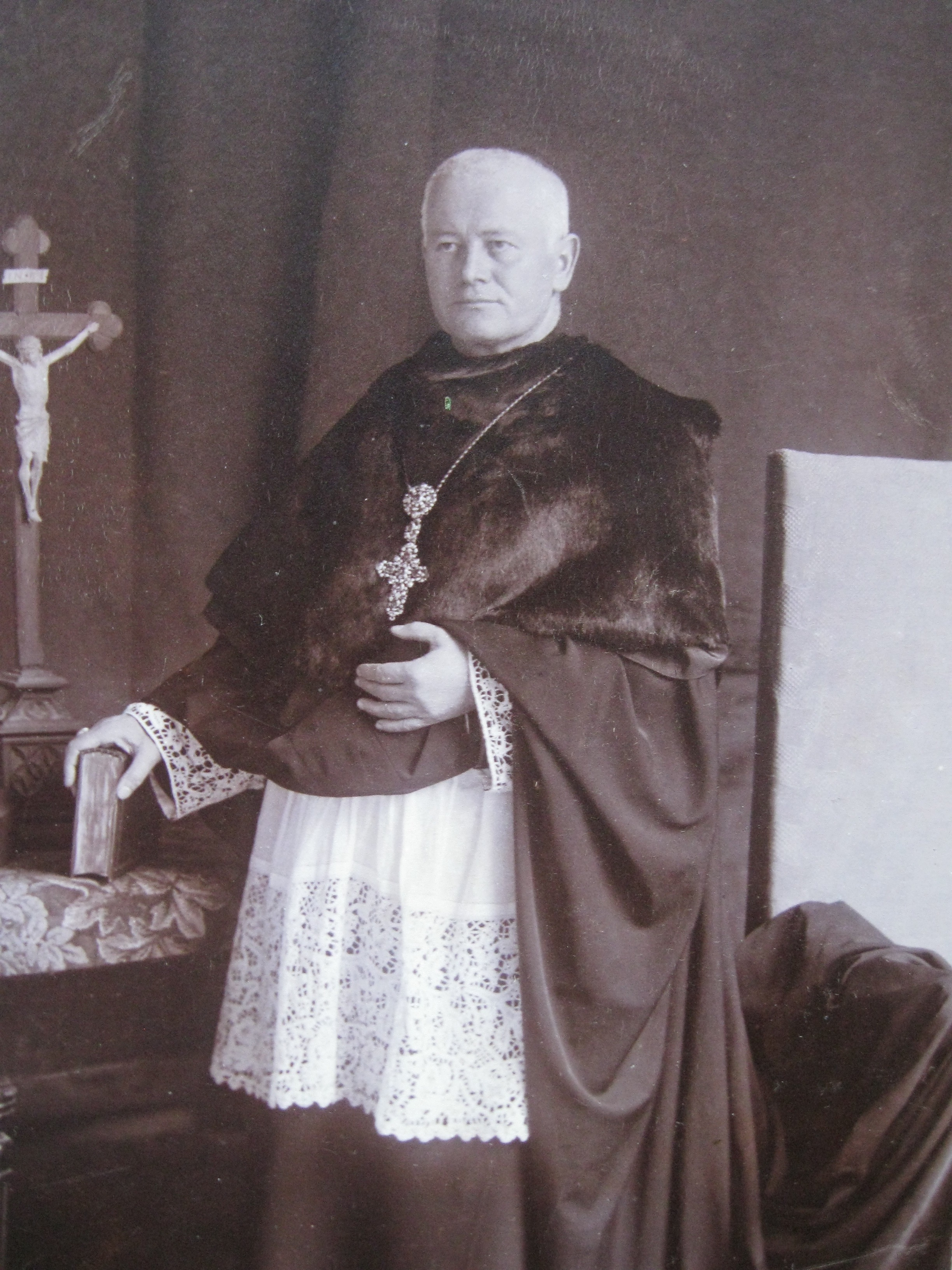
Benedictine arch Abbot Schober in Prelate Dress and Cappa Magna

Beuron Archabbey (in German Erzabtei Beuron, otherwise Erzabtei St. Martin; in Latin Archiabbatia Sancti Martini Beuronensis; Swabian: Erzabtei Beira) is a major house of the Benedictine Order located at Beuron in the upper Danube valley in Baden-Württemberg in Germany.

== History ==
It was founded by the brothers Maurus and Placidus Wolter. In 1862, with the assistance and support of Princess Katharina of Hohenlohe-Waldenburg-Schillingsfürst, they were able to purchase the former Augustinian monastery in Beuron, vacant since 1802. The foundation was coordinated with the Archbishop of Freiburg. While the settlement in Beuron was still being prepared, Maurus Wolter spent three months at the French Benedictine Abbey of Solesmes in the autumn of 1862. Abbot Prosper Guéranger's approach to Gregorian Chant made a deep impression on Wolter.

St. Martin's Abbey opened in 1863 as a daughter-house of the Abbey of St. Paul Outside the Walls, with Maurus Wolter as prior. In 1868 Beuron became an abbey and Maurus Wolter was ordained the first abbot. As St. Martin's Abbey began to distance itself from the motherhouse in Rome, it developed closer links with Abbot Prosper Guéranger and Solesmes. Wolter revived the ancient way of interpreting the Psalter, used it in contemporary form and utilized it in the training of novices.

In 1872, St. Martin's was able to found a subsidiary monastery in Maredsous, Belgium, with a few monks. Two years later, Maurus over the management of St. Martin's to his brother Placidus.

Between 1875 and 1887 because of political conditions during the "Kulturkampf" ("cultural struggle") the monks had to leave. Most relocated to Volders in Austria. Princess von Hohenzollern took care of the administration of the buildings and lands during their absence until the monks could return in 1887. The monks of Beuron used the opportunity to found new communities elsewhere, such as Erdington Abbey in England. In 1880 the Beuron family took over Emmaus Monastery in Prague. In 1883 Seckau Abbey in Austria was resettled by the Benedictines from Beuron. After approval of the constitutions, in 1884 the Beuronese Congregation was founded. It is a member of the Benedictine Confederation.

Beuron Abbey was reopened in 1887 and became the seat of the Archabbot and the venue for the annual General Chapter of the Congregation.

Beuron Abbey was a center of the 19th century Liturgical Movement, with Anselm Schott publishing a German translation of the Roman Missal since 1884. After the forced dissolution in the 1870s, Schott ultimately ended up in Maria Laach. The "Schott" German Missals and Prayers of the Faithful are still standard equipment in German parishes. Before becoming a priest, Romano Guardini visited the Abbey on retreats. A major figure of the Liturgical Movement, Guardini became an oblate and celebrated his first Mass with a chalice and paten made at the Abbey.

In the late 19th and early 20th centuries, the Beuron Art School, with its emphasis on early Christian and Byzantine art, was influential on religious art of the period. One of the biggest exhibits of this type of art in the United States is at Conception Abbey in Missouri which was founded on principles established by Beuron.

The abbey continues to be a centre of study. The library is the largest monastic library in Germany, with over 400,000 books. Since 1884 the abbey has published the Missale Romanum, a lay missal originally produced by Father Anselm Schott of Beuron. The abbey also houses the Vetus-Latina-Institut (Ancient Latin Institute), which has for its purpose the collection and publication of all extant Old Latin translations of the Bible.

== Archabbots since 1863 ==
1. Maurus (Rudolf) Wolter from Bonn (1825–1890): Founder prior 1863, Abbot 1868–1890, Archabbot since 1885
2. Placidus (Ernst) Wolter from Bonn, the founders brother (1828–1908): 1890–1908
3. Ildefons (Friedrich) Schober from Pfullendorf (1849–1918): 1908–1917
4. Raphael Walzer from Ravensburg (1888–1966): 1918–1937
5. Benedikt (Karl Borromäus) Baur from Mengen (1877–1963): 1938–1955
6. Benedikt (Johannes) Reetz from Ripsdorf/Eifel (1897–1964): 1957–1964
7. Damasus (Josef) Zähringer from Ibach (1899–1977): 1965–1967
8. Ursmar (Johannes) Engelmann from Jena (1909–1986): 1970–1980
9. Hieronymus (Gerhard) Nitz from Flensburg (1928-2020): 1980–2001
10. Theodor (Klaus) Hogg from Kirchen-Hausen (born 1941): 2001–2011
11. Tutilo (Heinz) Burger from Löffingen-Seppenhofen (born 1965), since 2011

== Burials ==
- Willibrord Benzler
- Hildebrand de Hemptinne
- Maurus Wolter and all his successors

== Sources ==
- Gröger, P. Augustinus, OSB, 2005. Das Kloster Beuron; in: Edwin Ernst Weber (ed.): Klöster im Landkreis Sigmaringen in Geschichte und Gegenwart (Heimatkundliche Schriftenreihe des Landkreises Sigmaringen, Band 9), pp. 46–92. Lindenberg: Kunstverlag Josef Fink. ISBN 3-89870-190-5.
- Schaber, P. Johannes, OSB, 2003. Phänomenologie und Mönchtum. Max Scheler, Martin Heidegger, Edith Stein und die Erzabtei Beuron; in: Holger Zaborowski & Stephan Loos (eds.): Leben, Tod und Entscheidung. Studien zur Geistesgeschichte der Weimarer Republik, pp. 71–100. Berlin.
- Stöckle, Joseph, 1888. Das Kloster Beuron im Donauthale (with illustrations and maps). Würzburg & Wien: Leo Woerl's Reisehandbücher.
