= Beuron =

- Municipality
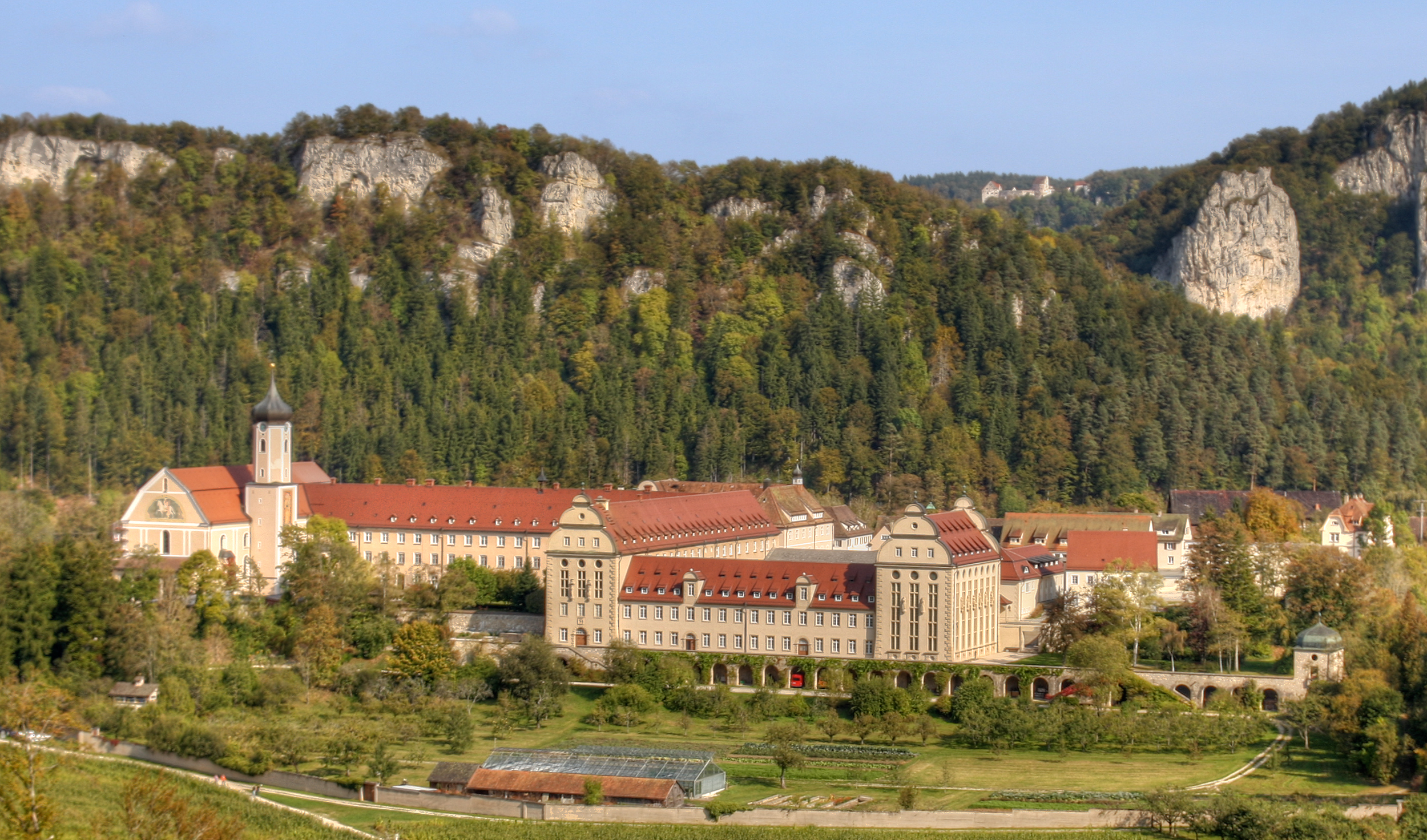
- Beuron Archabbey

- Coat of arms

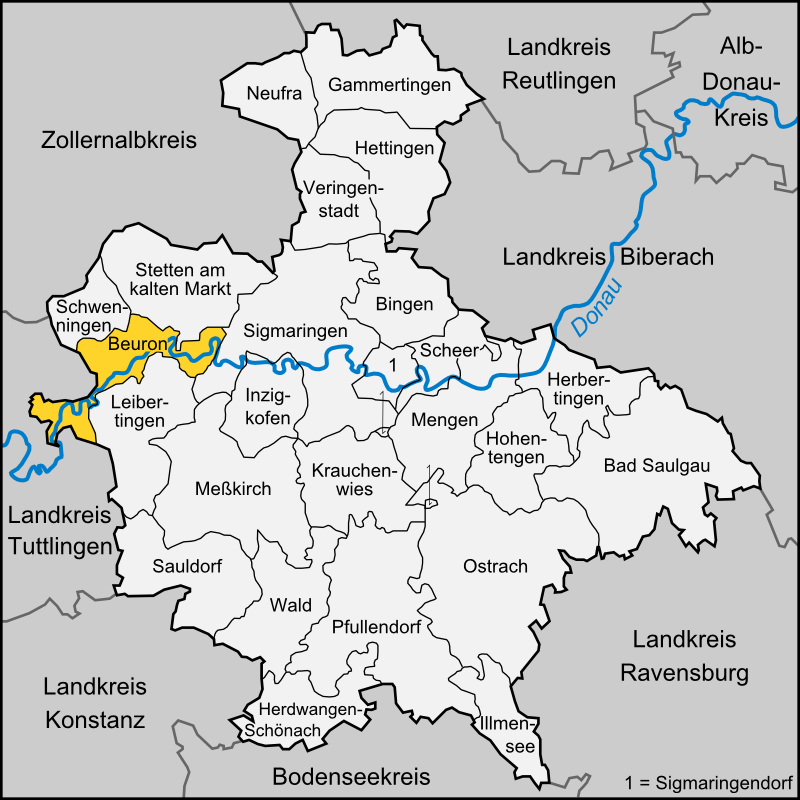
- Location of Beuron within Sigmaringen district
- Interactive map of Beuron
- Location within Germany Location within Baden-Württemberg
- Coordinates: 48°3′1″N 8°58′9″E
- Country: Germany
- State: Baden-Württemberg
- Admin. region: Tübingen
- District: Sigmaringen
- Subdivisions: 5

Government
  - Mayor (2024–32): Hans-Peter Wolf

Area
  - Total: 35.11 km^{2} (13.56 sq mi)
- Elevation: 625 m (2,051 ft)

Population (2025-12-31)
  - Total: 624
  - Density: 17.8/km^{2} (46.0/sq mi)
- Time zone: UTC+01:00 (CET)
  - Summer (DST): UTC+02:00 (CEST)
- Postal codes: 88631
- Dialling codes: 07466
- Vehicle registration: SIG
- Website: www.beuron.de

Beuron (Swabian: Beira) is a municipality in the district of Sigmaringen in Baden-Württemberg in Germany. Beuron is known for the Beuron Archabbey and the Beuron Art School for religious art.

== Geography ==
Beuron is divided into subdistricts (German: Ortsteile):

- Hausen im Donautal
- Langenbrunn
- Neidingen
- Thiergarten

== Mayors ==
- 1979–1995: Fidel Matthias Fischer
- 1995–1998: Arndt Neff
- 1998–2000: Gerhard Huhn (temporary)
- 2000–2003: Herbert Bucher
- 2003–2011: Robert Rauser
- 2011–2024: Raphael Osmakowski-Miller
- since 2024: Hans-Peter Wolf
