= Fiévet =

Fiévet is a French surname. Notable people with the surname include:

- Antoine Fiévet (born 1964/1965), French businessman
- Émile Fiévet (born 1886, died 1952), French footballer
- Jean-Marie Fiévet (born 1964), French politician
- Maurice Fiévet (born 1921, died 1997), French explorer and painter
