= Maredsous =

Maredsous may refer to:

- Maredsous (hamlet)
- Maredsous Abbey, a Benedictine monastery at Denée near Namur in Belgium
- Maredsous cheese, a cheese originated and still produced at Maredsous Abbey (above)
- Maredsous beer, an abbey beer brewed by Duvel Moortgat Brewery in Belgium
