= Antoine Fiévet =

French businessman

- Born: 1964 or 1965 (age 61–62)
- Occupation: Business executive
- Relatives: Léon Bel (great-grandfather)

Antoine Fiévet is a French businessman, the Chairman of the Bel Group and its CEO until 2022.

== Biography ==
Antoine Fiévet is the great-grandson of Léon Bel, the founder of the Bel Group.

He is the brother of Laurent Fiévet, visual-artist, film researcher and art collector.

He attended Paris-II University where he studied economics and law. He then graduated from ISG Business School in 1990.

Fiévet started his career in advertising.

He was appointed as the chief executive officer of the Bel Group on April 25, 2001. He has served as its chairman since May 14, 2009. He also serves as the chairman of the board of Unibel, the investment vehicle of the founding family, who are majority shareholders (the minority shareholders are the Besnier family, the owners of Lactalis).

He serves on the board of directors of Bonduelle, a company of tinned food.

He is one of the richest people in France.
