= Bioul =

Bioul Biou (Walloon)
- Village
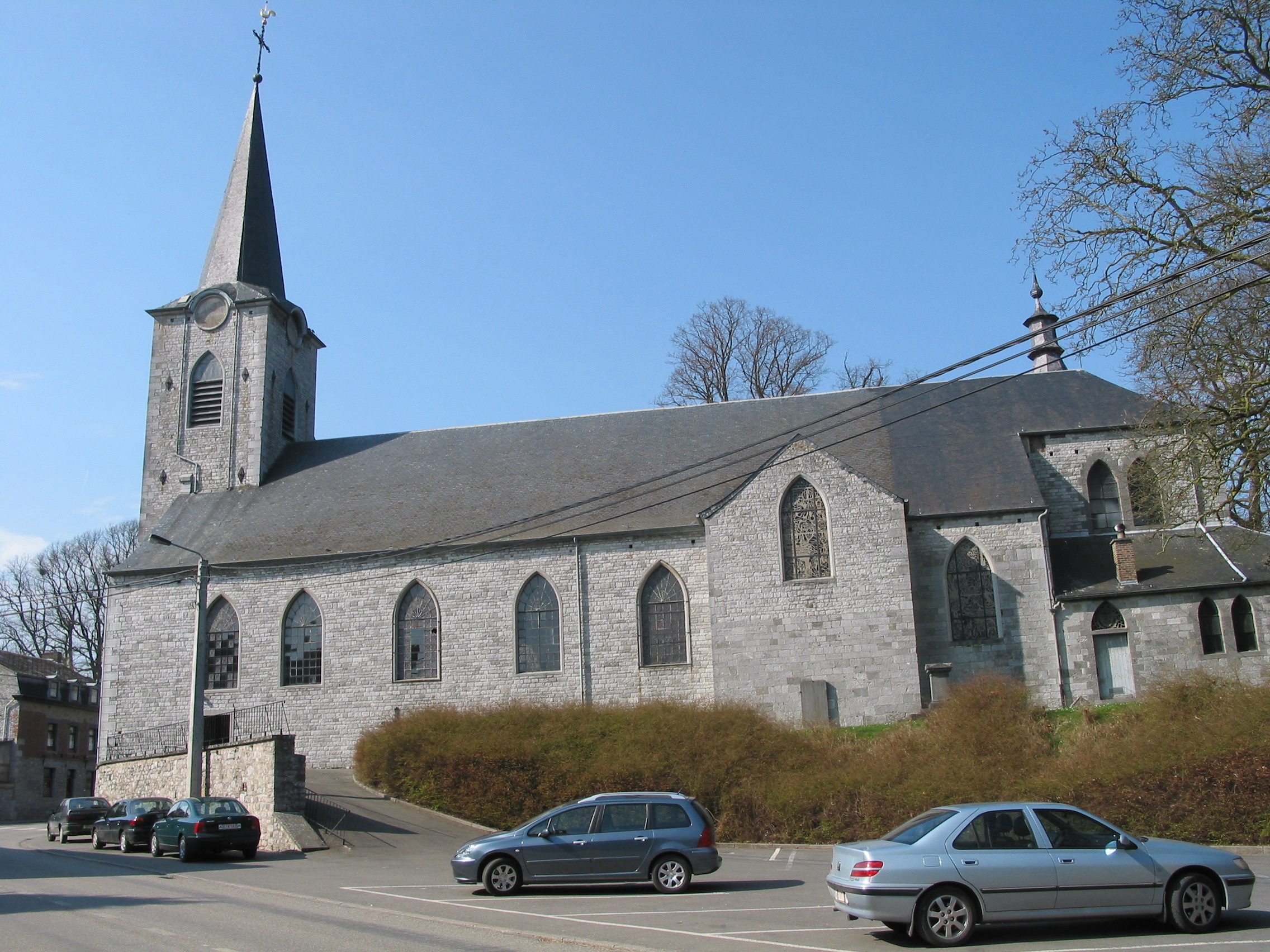
- Bioul: the church of Saint-Barthélemy

- Location within Belgium
- Coordinates: 50°20′N 4°48′E
- Country: Belgium
- Region: Wallonia
- Province: Namur
- Municipality: Anhée

Population (2008)
  - Total: 2,058
- Postal code: 5537

Bioul (Walloon: Biou) is a village of Wallonia and a district of the municipality of Anhée, located in the province of Namur, Belgium.

Bioul was previously administered as an independent municipality until 1977.

Bioul is located on the Condroz region of Belgium, a few kilometers to the west of the Meuse valley

== Etymology ==
The name of Bioul derives from the Celtic name bi-gorto meaning "enclosure".

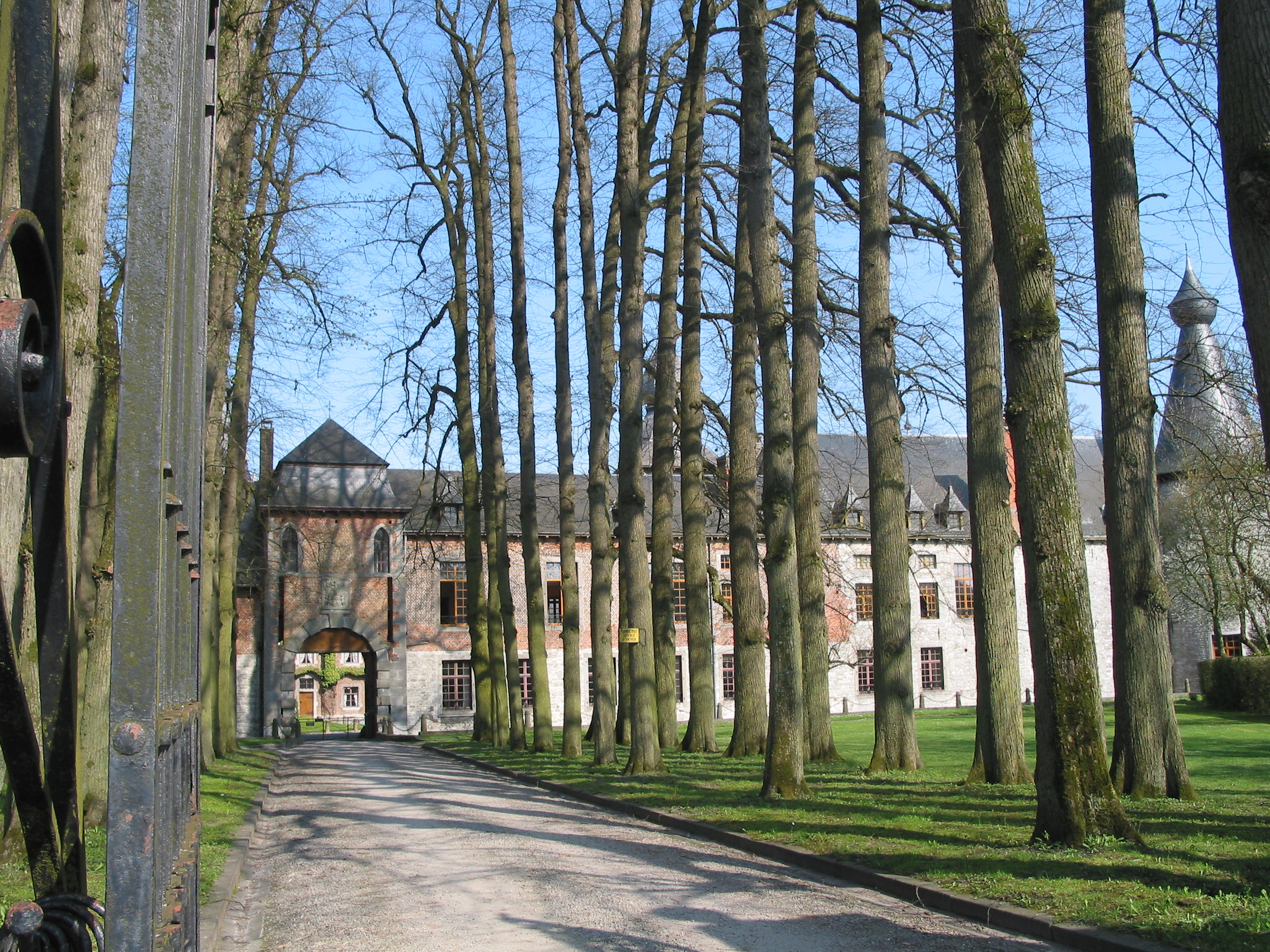
Bioul: The château Vaxelaire

== Economy ==
The village is served by regular bus services to Namur and Dinant.

At the Château white and sparkling wines, a little reminiscent of Riesling, are produced using varieties of Johanniter, Muscaris and Pinotin grapes, grown locally, having been adapted to survive a climate that is only just warm enough to support viticulture.

== Television celebrity ==
During the 1980s Bioul acquired a level of possibly unwelcome national celebrity thanks to the Tatayet Show broadcast on national television. The television humourist Jacques Jossart delighted in using an exaggerated pronunciation, referring to the village as "Bi-Youlll", and this caricatured pronunciation was later taken up by a younger generation of comedians such as François Pirette.
