= Denée, Belgium =

Section of Anhée, Wallonia, Belgium

Coordinates: 50°19′06″N 4°45′08″E

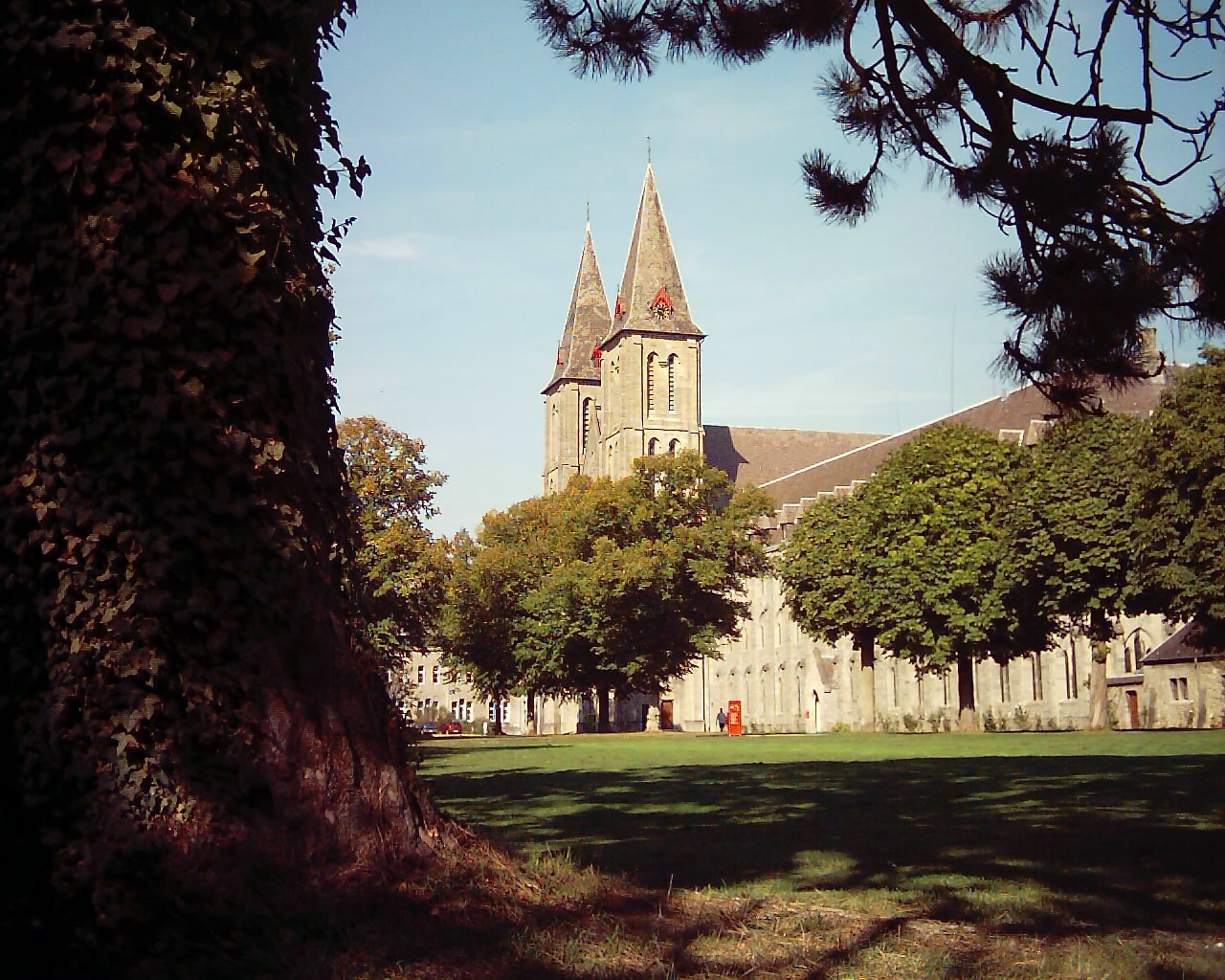
Maredsous Abbey

Denée (French pronunciation: [dəne]; Walloon: Dinêye) is a village of Wallonia and a district of the municipality of Anhée, located in the province of Namur, Belgium.

Maredsous Abbey and Maredret Abbey are located nearby, in the hamlet of Maredsous.
