= Jules Bel =

French businessman (1842-1904)

- Born: 30 September 1842; Chambéria, Jura, Franche-Comté, France
- Died: 11 January 1904 (aged 61); Orgelet, Jura, Franche-Comté, France
- Occupations: Cheese maker, company founder
- Known for: Founder of Groupe Bel
- Spouse: Adèle Odile Colombet
- Children: Henri Bel; Léon Bel
- Parent(s): Georges Napoléon Bel; Maximine Vernod

Jules Bel (30 September 1842 – 11 January 1904) was a French cheese maker. He was the founder of Groupe Bel.

== Early life ==
Jules Bel was born on 30 September 1842 in Chambéria, in rural France.

== Career ==
In 1865, Bel started his cheese company.

== Personal life ==
He married Adèle Odile Colombet.

== Death ==
He died on 11 January 1904 in Orgelet, France.
