= Présilly =

Présilly may refer to:

- Présilly, Jura, a commune in the French region of Franche-Comté
- Présilly, Haute-Savoie, a commune in the French region of Rhônes-Alpes
