= Annevoie Castle =

Château in Anhée, Belgium

Coordinates: 50.345°N 4.843°E

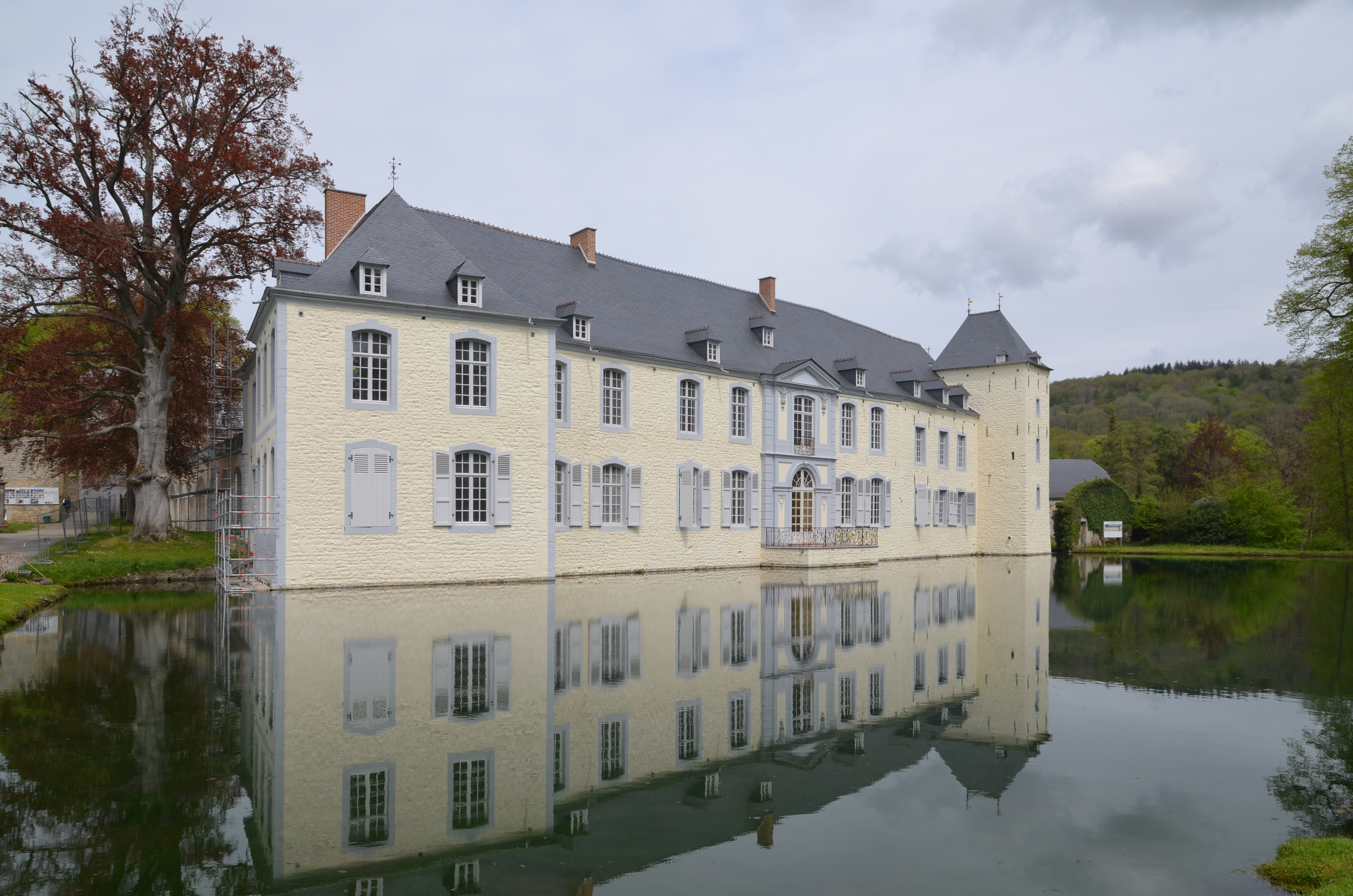
South face of the Annevoie Castle seen from the gardens in 2021.

Annevoie Castle (French: Château d'Annevoie) is a château in the village of Annevoie-Rouillon located in Wallonia in the municipality of Anhée, province of Namur, Belgium.

It was built in the 18th century by the Montpellier family, and is principally known for the extensive water gardens that surround it, the Jardins d'Annevoie, the only ones of their kind in Belgium. The design is basically French, but contains numerous English and Italian elements. The water is from the River Rouillon.

== See also ==
- List of castles in Belgium
- List of protected heritage sites in Anhée
