= Sylphide =

Sylphide might refer to:

- La Sylphide, a ballet choreographed by Filippo Taglioni in 1832 and by August Bournonville in 1836
- Les Sylphides, a ballet choreographed by Mikhail Fokine in 1909
- Sylphide, a cheese owned by Bel Group
