= The Laughing Cow =

Brand of processed cheese products

The Laughing Cow (La Vache qui Rit)
- Other names: Laughing Cow Cheese
- Country of origin: France; (produced worldwide)
- Region: Lons-le-Saunier
- Source of milk: Cow
- Pasteurised: Yes
- Texture: Semi-soft
- Aging time: Made from aged cheeses, but not aged itself
- Certification: Trademarked brand name

The Laughing Cow (French: La vache qui rit, pronounced [la vaʃ ki ʁi]) is a brand of processed cheese products made by Fromageries Bel since 1921. The name refers in particular to the brand's most popular product, the spreadable wedge.

== Description ==
The cheese is a blend of cream, milk, and fresh and aged cheeses, particularly comté, which are pasteurized to stop the ripening process. Versatile and keeping due to its pasteurization process, Laughing Cow can remain unrefrigerated for a limited length of time. The archetypal Laughing Cow cheese comes wrapped in the individual serving-sized foiled wedges and they are packaged in a round, flat box. Consumers have to pull a little red thread around the box to open it and the foil packaging also features a red tab for opening. The company was founded in 1921. The Laughing Cow is available in these formats in different worldwide markets:

- Triangles, squares, or rectangles in various flavors.
- Spreadable tubs and jars
- The Laughing Cow Dip & Crunch (name in the Americas and the UK), previously named Cheez Dippers, which are snacks consisting of bread sticks and cheese spread, and these come in four varieties; original, light, hazelnut and pizza. Named Pik & Croq in mainland Europe. The name Cheez Dippers is still in use in the Southeast Asian market, where they are also available in two sugary fruit flavors, as well as in Australia and the Netherlands.
- Slicing blocks of The Laughing Cow with a harder consistency like that of butter
- Ma P'tite Vache Qui Rit, pods of cheese spread to be eaten out of the pod with a spoon, especially for younger children
- Toastinette processed cheese slices, similar to Kraft Singles
- Bite-sized cubes, in various flavours and designed to be served as hors d'oeuvres at cocktail parties, called Cheez & Fun in many European countries, and also Snack Bites in the UK, Apéricube in France, Belgium and the Netherlands, PartyCubes in Canada, Mini Cubes in Australia and New Zealand, and Belcube in Japan and South Korea. They are produced in 24- or 48-cube boxes of one flavour, e.g. blue, ham, salmon, chili pepper and olive, or they are produced in 24- or 48-cube boxes of a particular theme, e.g., 'Cocktails du Monde', 'Petites Recettes', 'Tex-Mex' and 'Indian'.

Discontinued formats of The Laughing Cow include:

- Giggles/Blop processed cheese pods for younger children
- Squeeze bottles
- Big Cheez Dipper (a larger version of Cheez Dippers)
- Cheez Double Dippers (which contained crispy bacon flavour bits in addition to bread sticks and cheese spread).

The Laughing Cow USA introduced a TV commercial in 2009 where the company introduced a new slogan, "Have you laughed today?". In 2010 they updated the brand's website to include cheese recipes.

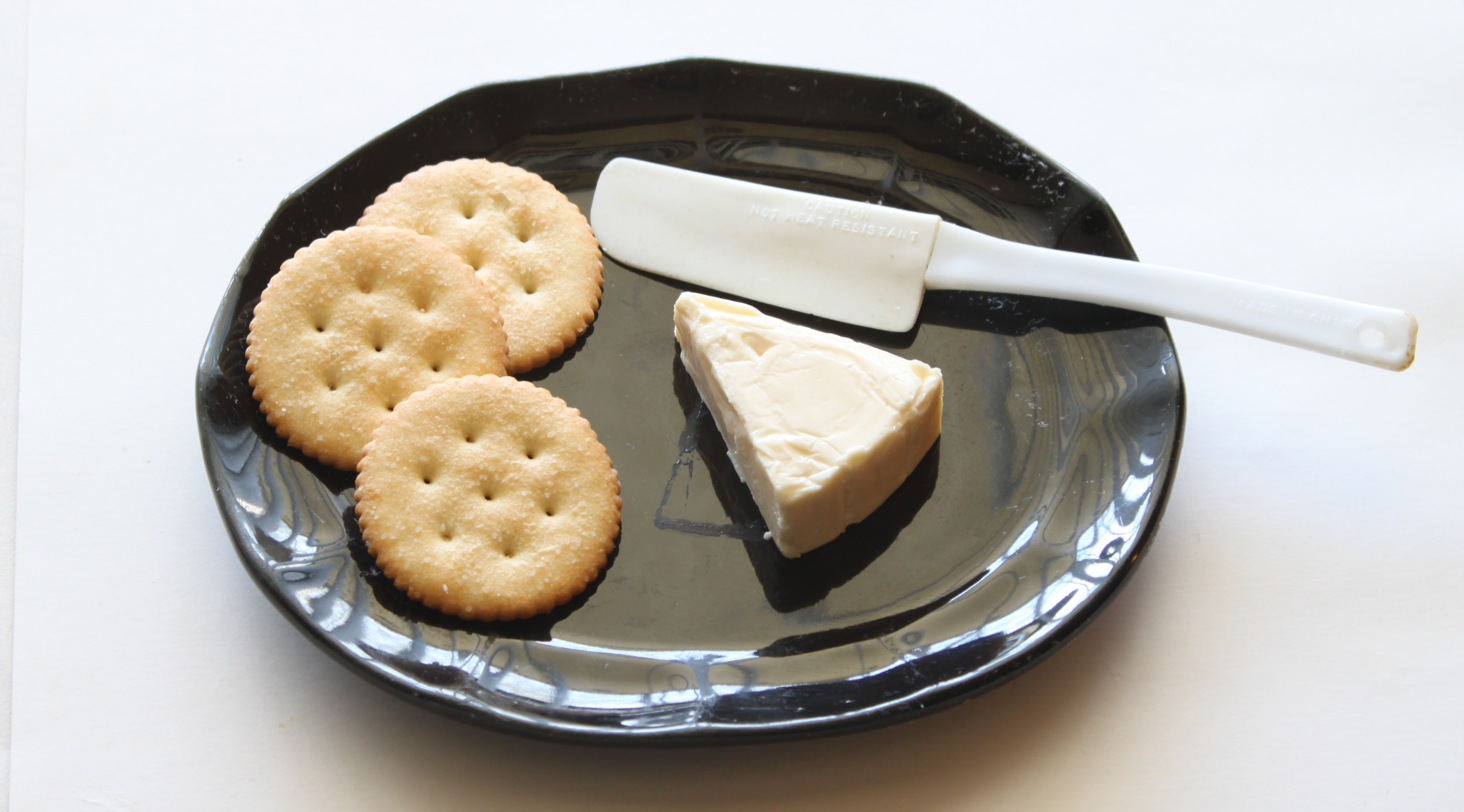
A wedge of Original Creamy Swiss

Laughing Cow cheese is available in its original flavour, a light version with 7% fat, and an ultra-light version with 3% fat. In addition, flavoured versions of the cheese (such as ham, gruyère, garlic, paprika, mushroom, chèvre, bleu, hazelnut, pizza, jalapeño and onion) are also available in various markets worldwide.

== Evolution of the brand ==
The concept of a laughing or smiling cow in advertising may predate the creation of The Laughing Cow brand. A 1903 advertisement in an American newspaper featured a smiling cow promoting "Star Brand Butter" and "Milton's Ice Cream".

The Laughing Cow brand as we know it today was established later. On April 16, 1921, Léon Bel trademarked his brand, as La Vache Qui Rit, in France. The original drawing was made as a mascot for Bel's supply-train unit during World War I by illustrator Benjamin Rabier and was called "La Wachkyrie", a play on the word for Valkyrie. The cow in the original drawing was not red and did not wear ear tags. Rabier later edited the drawing into something more like the image that prevails today.

The Laughing Cow is now depicted as a red and white cow appearing jovial, and almost always wearing ear tags that look like the round boxes the cheese comes in. The blue and white stripes around the box date from 1955. Since 1976 both ear-tag boxes have been shown with the top side visible. Before then, one tag showed the top and the other showed the bottom side. The current logo uses the Droste effect, with the laughing cow appearing inside the ear tags.

Kiri (pronounced in the same way as "qui rit") is a separate brand that Bel established in 1966.

In 2026, a temporary branding change resulted in The Laughing Cow being depicted with a frown.

== Worldwide popularity ==
The cheese has long been popular in the United Kingdom and Canada as a children's snack. The cheese is also known in the United States, though it is not seen as a "French cheese".

== Other associations ==
- The product name and indicia were adopted by the crew of World War II German submarine U-69, whose sinking of the SS Robin Moor was significant to US entry into World War II.
- La Vache Qui Rit is the name of a finishing move in the 1994 video game Primal Rage. The character Vertigo will move up to an opponent and transform them into a cow, which makes a disconcerted moo as it runs away.
- La vache qui lit ('The reading cow') is the children's book prize of the city of Zürich, and a children's book program in the Auvergne region of France.
- The Laughing Cow's mascot appears on the cover of the 2002 album Human by UK electronic musician Freeform.

== See also ==
- Emmi AG - manufacturer of Swiss Knight brand of spreadable cheese wedges
- Dairylea (cheese) - Similar popular spreadable cheese in UK/Ireland
- Babybel - another internationally distributed snack-sized cheese product produced by Fromageries Bel
