= Maredsous (hamlet) =

- Hamlet
- Location within Belgium
- Coordinates: 50°18′N 4°46′E
- Country: Belgium
- Region: Wallonia
- Province: Namur
- Municipality: Anhée

Maredsous is a hamlet of the village of Denée, Wallonia, located in the municipality of Anhée, province of Namur, Belgium.

The Maredsous Abbey was founded in 1872 by Beuron monks and is built in Gothic Revival style. Maredsous also has a guesthouse and a reception building with shops, museum and restaurant space, the Centre Grégoire Fournier.

Maredsous is a tourist resort and the forests provide opportunities for hiking. There are many restaurants and campsites along the former railway and bike trail.

Local specialties of Maredsous are sold across Europe. The hamlet is known in particular for its Maredsous beer, founded in 1963 by local Benedictine monks and Maredsous cheese which has a fat content of 45% and is made from cow's milk and has been made since 1953. Initially it was made by the abbey but since 1959, the cheese is no longer made by the monks but by a milk cooperative. This company was acquired in 1990 by the French group BEL.
