= List of protected heritage sites in Anhée =

This table shows an overview of the protected heritage sites in the Walloon town Anhée. This list is part of Belgium's national heritage.

Object	Year/architect	Town/section	Address	Coordinates	Number^{?}	Image
Church of Our Lady of the Nativity ^{(nl)} ^{(fr)}		Anhée	Sosoye	50.295844°N 4.782294°E	91005-CLT-0005-01 Info	Kerk Onze Lieve Vrouwe van de Geboorte ('Notre-Dame de la Nativité') en het ensemble van de kerk en het omliggende terrein More images
Source 4 of Annevoie Castle ^{(nl)} ^{(fr)}		Anhée	Annevoie-Rouillon	50.343677°N 4.839329°E	91005-CLT-0006-01 Info	
Roof gables of Annevoie Castle ^{(nl)} ^{(fr)}		Anhée	Annevoie-Rouillon	50.344938°N 4.843379°E	91005-CLT-0007-01 Info	De gevels en daken van het kasteel van Annevoie en alle kamers op de begane grond en de muren en het dak van de schuur en het ensemble van het kasteel, bijgebouwen, tuinen en de omliggende More images
Source 1 and surroundings ^{(nl)} ^{(fr)}		Anhée	Annevoie-Rouillon	50.330016°N 4.826874°E	91005-CLT-0008-01 Info	
Source 2 and surroundings ^{(nl)} ^{(fr)}		Anhée	Annevoie-Rouillon	50.340028°N 4.835975°E	91005-CLT-0009-01 Info	
Source 3 and surroundings ^{(nl)} ^{(fr)}		Anhée	Annevoie-Rouillon	50.342452°N 4.834588°E	91005-CLT-0010-01 Info	
18th century garden (of Annevoie Castle) ^{(nl)} ^{(fr)}		Anhée	Annevoie-Rouillon	50.343185°N 4.841471°E	91005-CLT-0011-01 Info	De tuinen uit de 18e eeuw More images
Elm tree ^{(nl)} ^{(fr)}		Anhée	rue de Graux, Denée	50.320685°N 4.743635°E	91005-CLT-0012-01 Info	
Lawn of Ransinelle, called "de la montagne" ^{(nl)} ^{(fr)}		Anhée		50.300225°N 4.777197°E	91005-CLT-0013-01 Info	
Castle Montaigle grounds ^{(nl)} ^{(fr)}		Anhée		50.295633°N 4.815005°E	91005-CLT-0015-01 Info	Uitbreiding van de classificatie van de site vand e ruïnes van het kasteel van Montaigle More images
Extension of grounds of ruins of Castle Montaigle ^{(nl)} ^{(fr)}		Anhée		50.295633°N 4.815005°E	91005-PEX-0001-01 Info	

== See also ==
- List of protected heritage sites in Namur (province)
