= Léon Bel =

French businessman (1878-1957)

- Born: 28 July 1878; Orgelet, Jura, Franche-Comté, France
- Died: 19 July 1957 (aged 78); Paris, France
- Occupation: Businessman
- Known for: created The Laughing Cow cheese brand
- Parent(s): Jules Bel; Adèle Odile Colombet

Léon Bel (28 July 1878 – 19 July 1957) was a French businessman known for creating The Laughing Cow cheese brand.

== Early life ==
Léon Bel was born on 28 July 1878 in Orgelet in rural France. His father, Jules Bel, was a cheese maker who created the Bel Group.

He served in the French Army during World War I.

== Career ==
Bel took over the Bel Group from his father. With Swiss cheese makers, he learned how to make cheese that would keep. In 1921, he launched the brand known as The Laughing Cow.

== Death ==
He died on 19 July 1957 in Paris, France.
