= Maredret Abbey =

Abbey of Maredret
- l’Abbaye des saints Jean et Scolastique
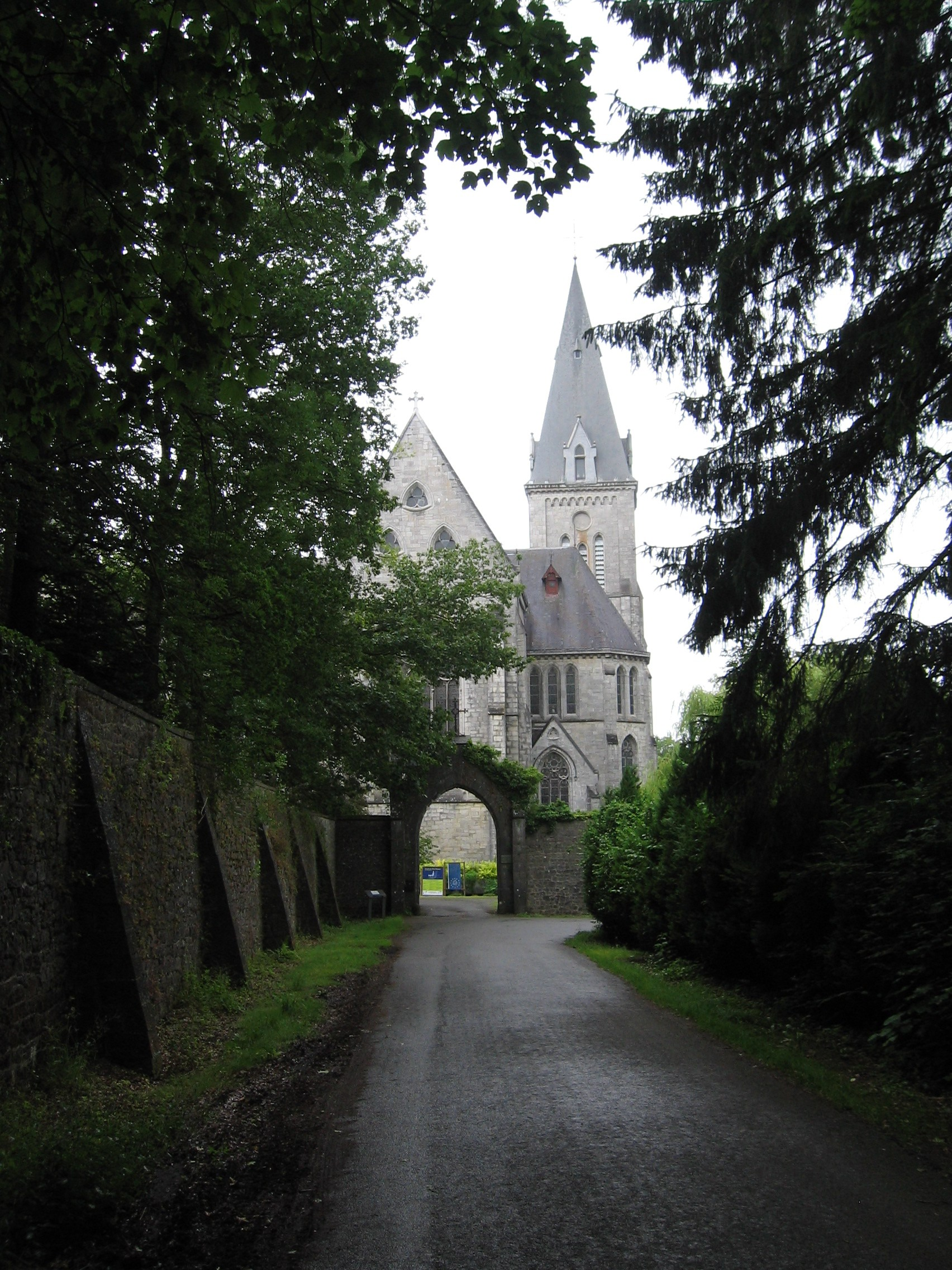

- Location within Belgium

General information
- Location: Maredret, Sosoye,, Anhée, Belgium
- Coordinates: 50°17′51″N 4°45′25″E

Maredret Abbey (French: Abbaye de Maredret), also known as l’Abbaye des saints Jean et Scolastique, is a monastery of Benedictine nuns located on the edge of Maredret, a very small village in the hilly countryside to the south of Charleroi and Namur, Wallonia, Belgium. The abbey was inaugurated with the installation of seven nuns in 1893, and the abbey church was constructed between 1898 and 1907.

Maredret is affiliated with the Congregation of the Annunciation within the Benedictine Confederation.

== History ==
The abbey's foundation was part of the wider monastic revival of the nineteenth century. The project to establish a community of Benedictine nuns at Maredret was set in motion by Agnès de Hemptinne, a member of a local family of aristocrats.

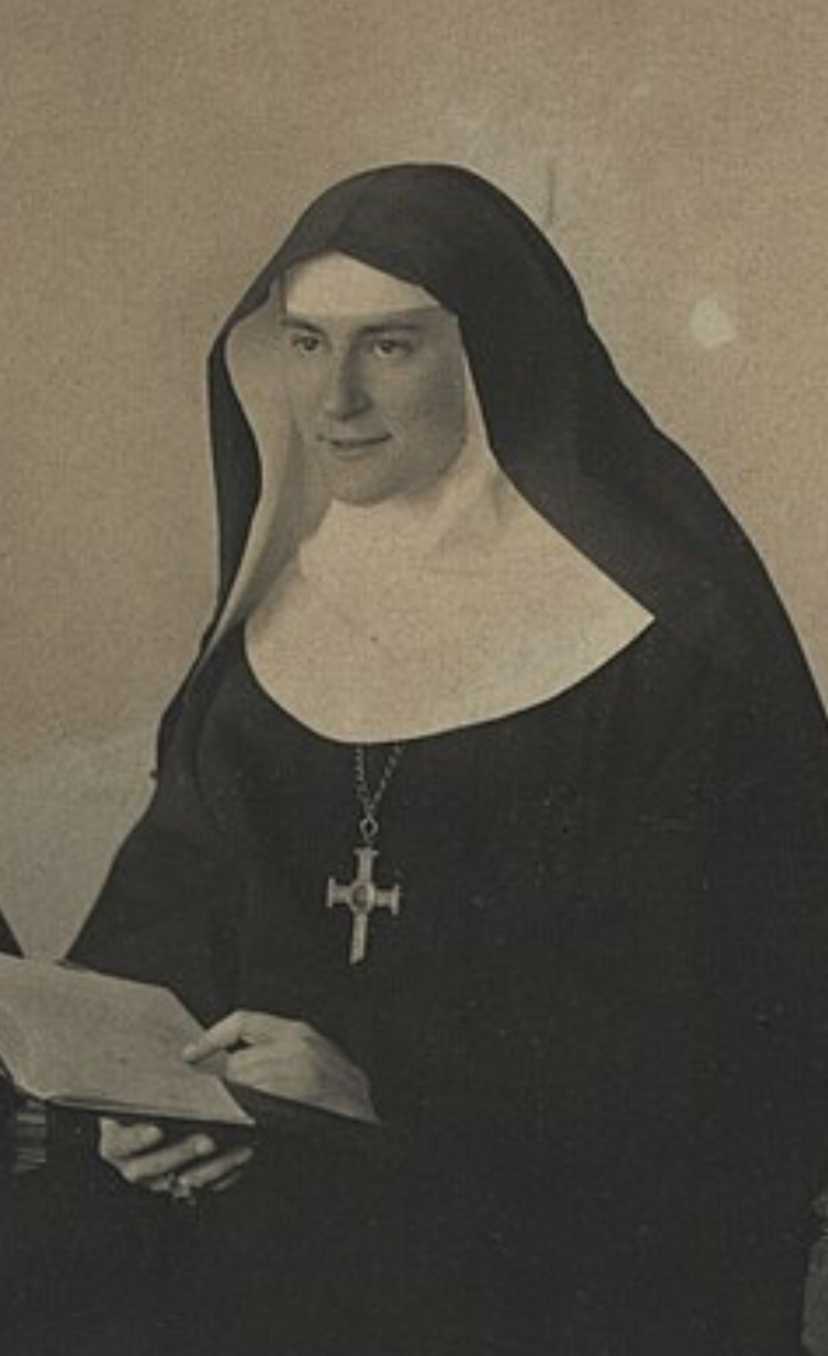
Agnès de Hemptinne

Land was provided by the Desclée family, and the first stone was put in place on 5 August 1891. Building was completed only in 1936, however. The monastery comprises a compact collection of stone buildings in a neo-gothic style, under a traditional slate roof, and sited on a hill-side, overlooking Maredret and the Molignée valley.

The abbey church, completed in 1907, was one of the final projects of the fashionable Gothic revival Gent-based architect Auguste Van Assche. The interior and the windows have been described as remarkable. Later buildings were the work of a succession of local architects. The site of 15 hectares is surrounded by a high wall of rough stone, enhanced with two medieval style towers.

== Outbuildings ==
The site also incorporated various outbuildings, located within but close to the outer wall. The "Clos Saint-Jean" (previously known as the Villa Saint-Jean/Saint John villa) and the "Clos Saint-Pierre" previously known as "the gardener's house", and later as the "school house" were both built in 1892, the work of the architect G. Soreil. The "Clos Saint-Pierre" was expanded in 1933 and became, for many years, a Visitor Centre.

On the south side of the site, at the foot of the hill, the "Chapel of Our Lady of Grace" ("Notre-Dame de Grâce") houses a copy of the image of "Our Lady of Grace": the original, at nearby Berzée, has been venerated for its miraculous powers since 1909. The construction of the chapel at Maredret, using stone quarried locally at Denée, was the work of the architect-contractor Lambotte.

== Today ==
The abbey has become focused increasingly on crafts. The nuns have expertise in the art of Illuminated manuscript, which may be applied to documents marking important stages in individual Christian lives: baptism, religious confirmation or conversion, marriage and burial. Religious imagery is an important part of the abbey's ongoing life, along with artisanal regional food products.

In 2016, the nuns of the abbey began brewing beer to raise funds for repairs and maintenance. This made them the first nuns to do so, as beer brewing is traditionally the purview of monks.

== See also ==
- Maredsous Abbey
