= Boursin cheese =

French brand of soft cheese

Boursin
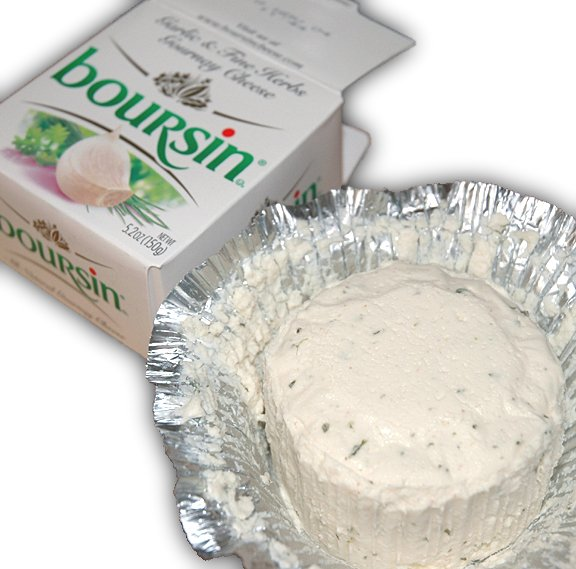
- Country of origin: France
- Region, town: Normandy
- Source of milk: Cows
- Pasteurised: Yes
- Texture: Soft
- Certification: None

Boursin (French pronunciation: [buʁsɛ̃]) is a French brand of soft, fresh Gournay-style cheese made from pasteurized cow’s milk and cream, with herbs mixed in, resulting in a crumbly texture. It is sold as a spreadable cheese.

The first Boursin flavour, garlic and fine herbs, was created in 1963 by François Boursin, a cheesemaker from Normandy. Boursin's product was derived from a traditional party dish, fromage frais (French for "fresh cheese"); guests would take their cheese and add herbs for flavour. His recipe was the first flavoured cheese product to be sold nationally in France. Boursin is a so-called "Gournay cheese" invented by Norman cheese maker François Boursin in 1957. It's a soft, creamy, spreadable cow's milk cheese—not dissimilar from mascarpone, goat's milk chèvre, or Brie—that was "inspired by the common French party treat called fromage frais." The original flavour is garlic-and-fines herbes. Chef Ludo Lefevbre recommends the cracked black pepper flavour of Boursin for filling a French omelette.

Boursin cheese was first developed in Normandy, and at one time was produced exclusively in Croisy-sur-Eure, by the Boursin company. In 1990, the Boursin name was acquired by Unilever, which sold it to Groupe Bel in November 2007 for €400 million.

== Advertising ==
The brand was advertised on television from 1 October 1968, when French television allowed commercial breaks for the first time. In 1972 their advertising slogan: Du pain, du vin, du Boursin (Some bread, some wine, some Boursin) was launched. This slogan was later modified to Du pain, du Boursin, on est bien (Some bread, some Boursin, we are fine).

== See also ==
- Roule cheese
