= Warnant, Namur =

Section of Anhée, Wallonia, Belgium

Coordinates: 50.322°N 4.8324°E

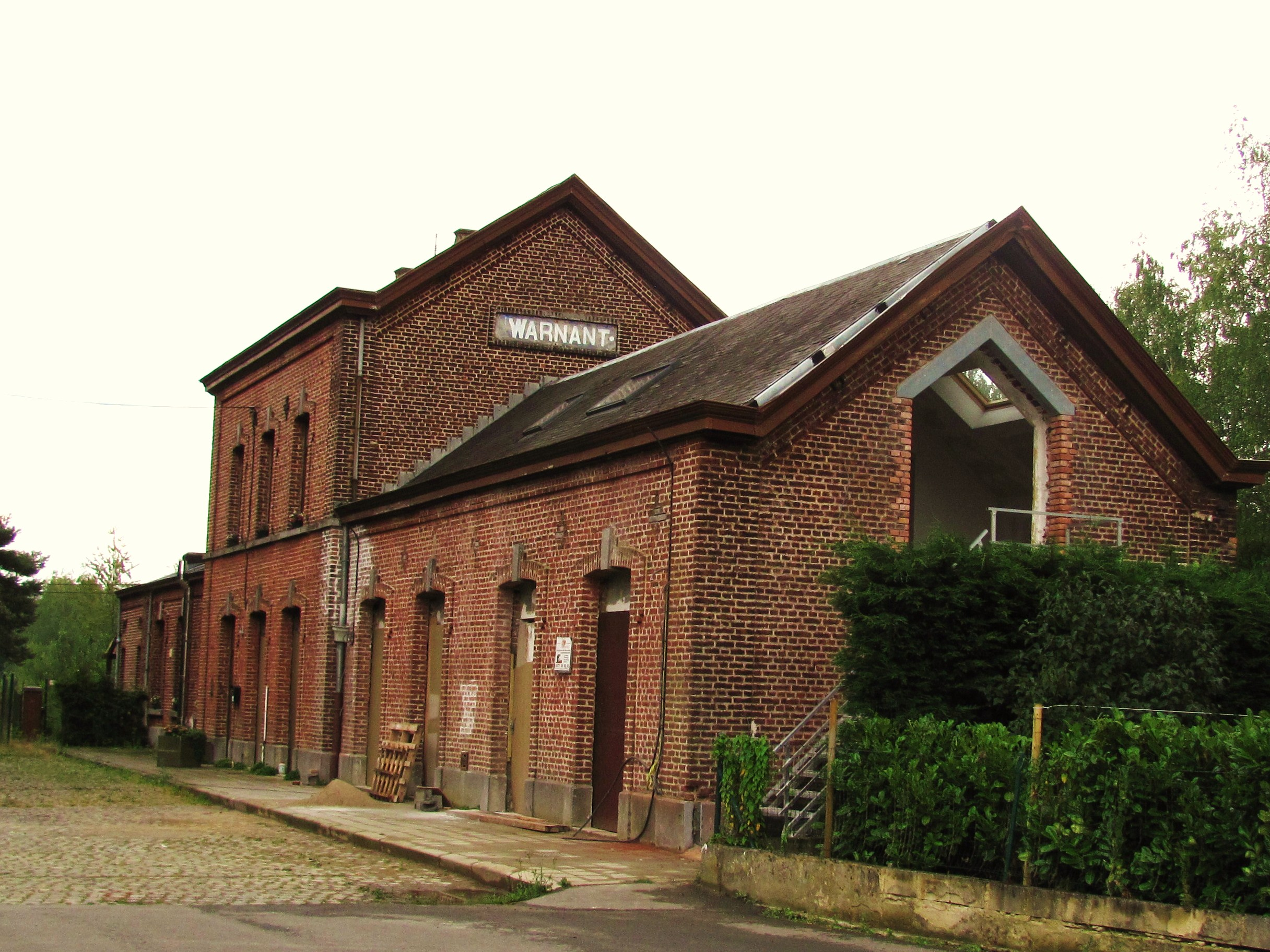
Station Warnant

Warnant (French pronunciation: [waʁnɑ̃]; Walloon: Warnin) is a village of Wallonia and a district of the municipality of Anhée, located in the province of Namur, Belgium.

Until 1977, it was a separate municipality.

This village also includes the nearby hamlet of Salet.
