= Senay =

- Hamlet
- Location within France
- Coordinates: 46°32′25″N 5°34′48″E
- Country: France
- Region: Franche-Comté
- Department: Jura
- Arrondissement: Lons-le-Saunier
- Canton: Moirans-en-Montagne
- Commune: Présilly
- Highest elevation: 515 m (1,690 ft)
- Lowest elevation: 491 m (1,611 ft)
- Postal Code: 39270

Senay is a village and a hamlet of Présilly commune in the Jura département, in the French region of Bourgogne-Franche-Comté. Senay has a maximum of 8 houses out of which almost half are occupied by the same family who own the land around this hamlet.

There is an industrial zone between Senay and Orgelet where famous manufacturers like Verchere Plastiques (plastic manufacturing notably for perfume bottles) and Janod (wooden toys made from the forests of Jura) and a factory for an American engineering company Pulse Engineering (company) (A Technitrol Company) have their establishments.

Senay is also a boys name of Tigrayan origin meaning "a state of tranquility and bliss".

== See also ==
- Communes of the Jura department
