= Babybel =

Brand of small snack cheese from France

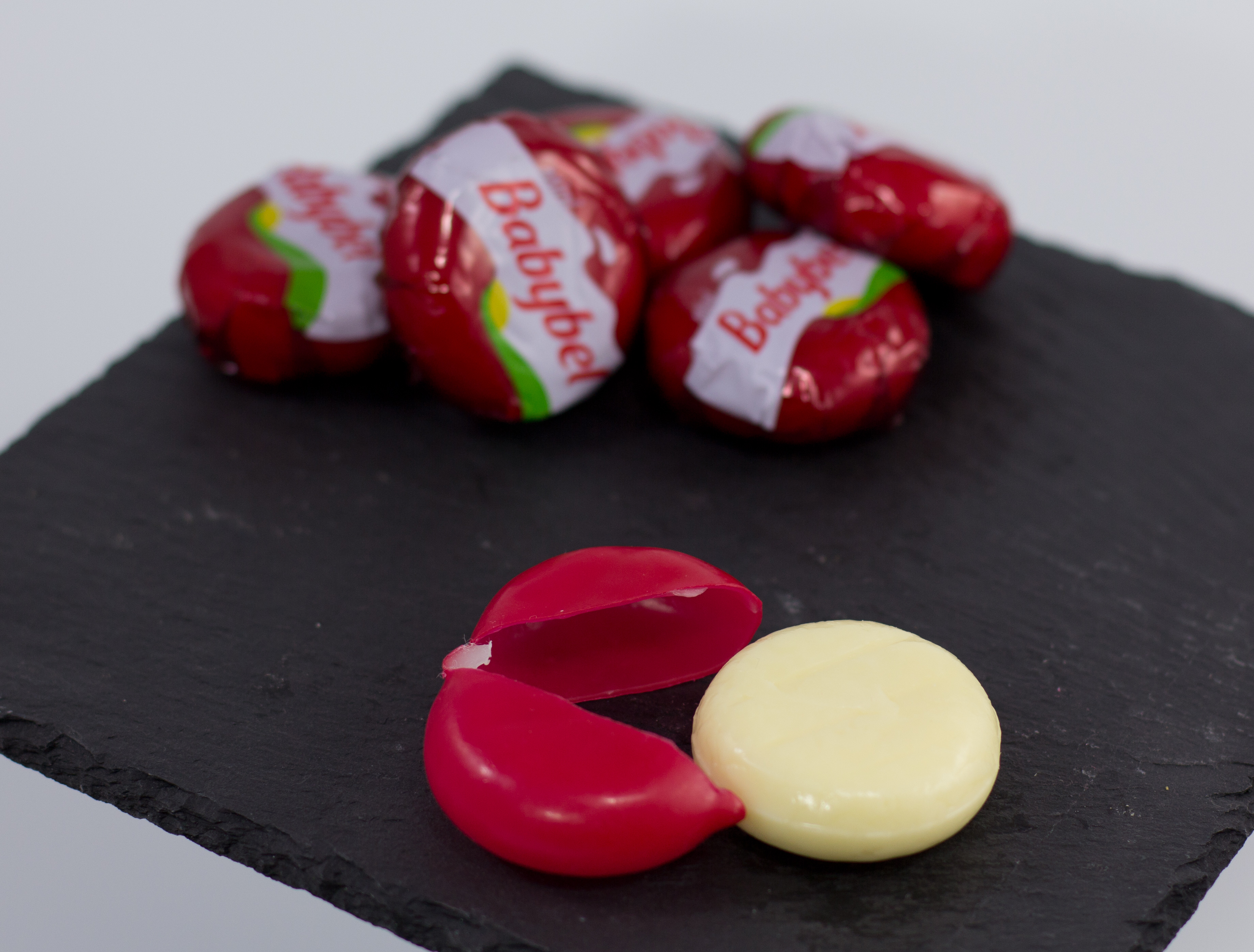
- Country of origin: France (produced worldwide)
- Source of milk: Cow
- Pasteurised: Yes
- Texture: Semi-hard
- Certification: Trademarked brand name

Mini Babybel is a brand of small snack cheese products that are individually packaged and available in various flavours. It is a product of Le Groupe Bel (French for 'The Bel Group'), a company with roots in the Jura region of France, started by Jules Bel in 1865. Half of the global production of Mini Babybel is made in Évron, a commune in the northwest of France.

In the United States, Le Groupe Bel produces the Mini Babybel cheeses in Kentucky. In March 2016, Bel Brands USA opened a new plant in Brookings, South Dakota. At the time, Bel Brands projected that its 250 employees would produce 1.5 million Mini Babybel cheese wheels per day. In July 2018, Le Groupe Bel announced that the company had 12,700 employees in 30 subsidiaries around the world and that their first Canadian production facility would be in Quebec.

== Products ==
The "Original", most popular, Mini Babybel is an Edam-style cheese made from pasteurised milk, vegetarian rennet, lactic ferments, and salt. It is made using traditional Edam-making processes, except that rennet from vegetarian – rather than animal – sources is used. It is also naturally lactose-free.

Mini Babybel is known for its packaging, consisting of a netted bag in which each piece of cheese is encased in a blend of colored paraffin and microcrystalline wax, inside of a cellophane wrapper made of wood pulp, cotton, or "other vegetation".

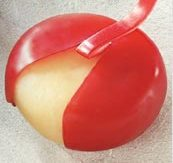
The red wax encasement being removed from a Babybel cheese

=== Flavors (with corresponding wrapping colors) ===
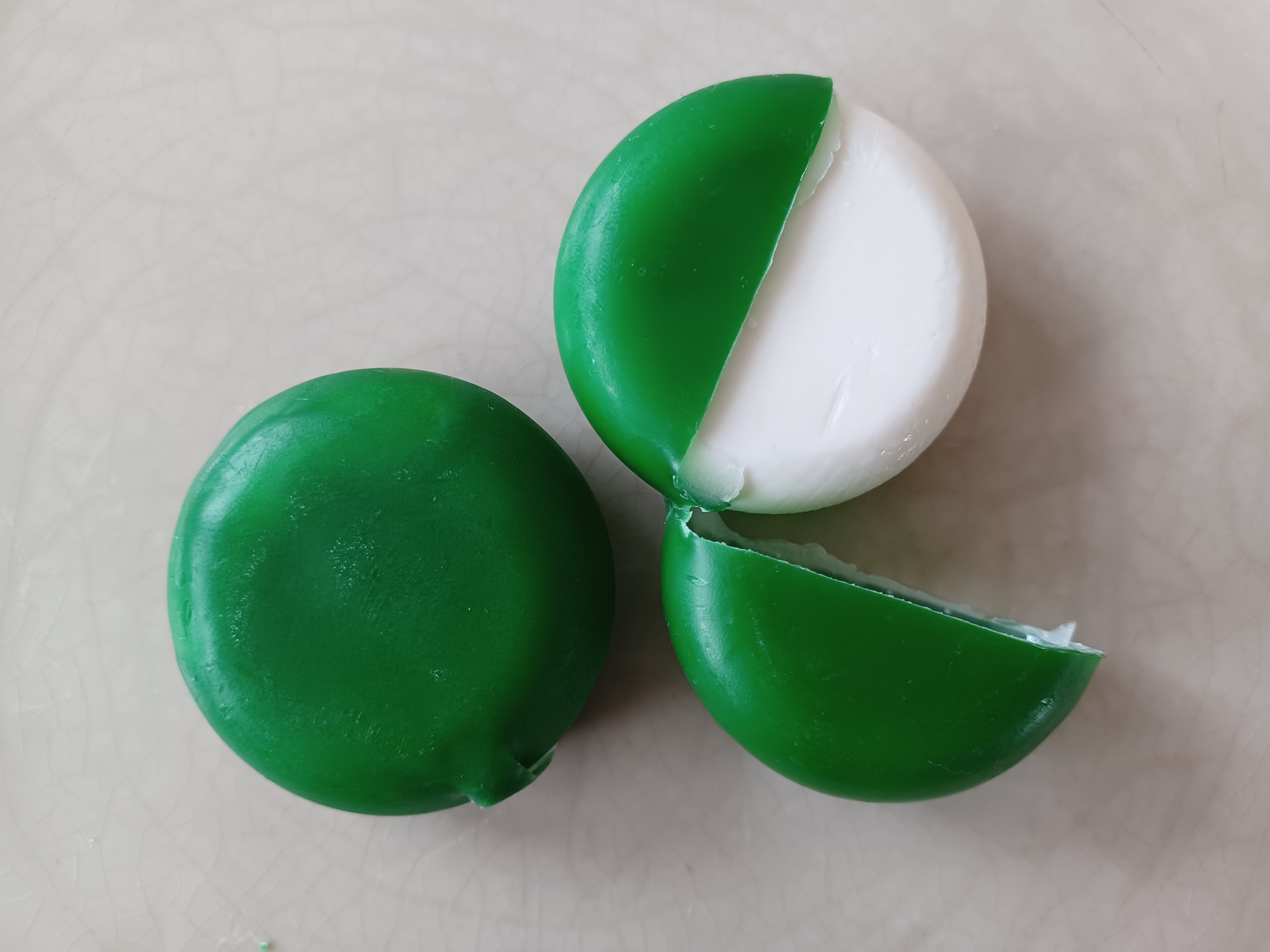
Babybel plant-based cheese

Flavor	Color	References/comments
"Original" Edam	Red (all locations)	
"Light" Edam	Red, with light blue stripe on red cellophane (all locations)	Sponsored by WeightWatchers in Canada
Organic Edam	Light Green and White, with "Bio" in green letters (Belgium, France, Netherlands, Portugal, United Kingdom); Light Green and Red, with "Bio" in green letters (Slovakia)	Vegetarian
Cheddar	Black (Canada, United States); Orange (Australia – discontinued); Purple (Belgium, Denmark, Finland, France, Ireland, Norway, Slovakia, Spain – discontinued, Sweden, Switzerland, United Kingdom)	
Emmental	Yellow (Belgium, Canada – discontinued, France, Germany, Greece, Ireland, Slovakia, Spain – discontinued, United Kingdom, United States - discontinued)	
Gruyere	Yellow (Canada, Switzerland)	
Goat's cheese	Green (Canada – discontinued, France – discontinued, Ireland – discontinued, United Kingdom – discontinued)	
Gouda	Brown/Orange (Canada, Germany, Norway – discontinued, United States); Yellow (Ireland – discontinued, United Kingdom – discontinued)	
Monterey Jack	Turquoise (United States)	
Mozzarella	Green (United States, Canada – discontinued, Greece – discontinued)	
"Sharp Original" (cheese type unknown)	Magenta (United States)	
"High Protein"	Black (Australia, Belgium, Czechia, Germany, Italy – discontinued, Netherlands – discontinued, Portugal, Norway, United Kingdom)	
Plant-Based Cheese	Green wax, green wrap with leaves (Canada, Netherlands, Switzerland, United Kingdom, United States)	Vegan. Appears in a pouch instead of a net bag. Made with a "blend of coconut oil and starch".
Plant-Based "White Cheddar"	Green wax, dark green wrap with leaves (United States)	Vegan. Appears in a pouch instead of a net bag. Made with coconut oil and starch.

=== Babybel products ===
Babybel mini rolls in its plastic packaging

- Mini Babybel
  - Mini Babybel (AT, AU, BE, CA, CZ, DE, ES, EE, FI, FR, GR, IE,IL, IT, MX, NL, NO, NZ, PL, PT, SK, UK, US)
  - Mini Roulés/Enrollados/Mini Rolls – Edam only (CA, CH, DE, ES, FR, IT, NL)
  - Babybel Plus+ Probiotic (AU)
  - Cheese & Crackers – Edam, Edam Light, and White Cheddar (Discontinued)
- Babybel Maxi – Edam only (BE, FR, DE, NL)
- Babybel Tranches/Scheiben – Edam only (BE, CH, DE, FR)
- Babybel Light Cheese Apple & Grapes – Light Edam only (UK)

== Advertising ==
An advertising jingle associated with the product plays on the lyrics of the song "Barbara Ann" by The Regents. Use of said jingle started in France in the end of the 1970s, and then emerged to other parts of Europe and French-Canada by the start of the 1990s. They tout the product as an "always on the go and ready for anything" snack cheese.

The advertising for Babybel in the UK in the late 1990s and early 2000s had the slogan "Too tasty to share".

As of 2012, a recording of the song "Get in Line" by I'm from Barcelona has been used in their adverts, where the band rerecorded the song with a children's choir. In August 2012, there was controversy over its promotional use of the French slogan "Des vacances de malade mental" ("having a mental holiday", or literally "holidaying like a mentally ill person") which was deemed offensive to people with learning difficulties or mental illnesses.

In January 2026, Babybel teamed up with American music producer Timbaland to produce limited edition 3-inch vinyl records, Mini Wax Tracks, featuring pop and EDM remixes of the latter's song "I'm Your Baby". Timbaland said of the collaboration, "Working with Babybel on Mini Wax Tracks was just pure fun. I wanted to keep the playful energy of 'I'm Your Baby' while adding my own sound. It’s creative, unexpected, and all about bringing good energy to something small but mighty."
