= Roule cheese =

Variety of French soft cheese

Roule cheese is a French cheese with a soft and creamy texture, that is usually flavoured with herbs and garlic. It was initially made by the Tablanette Fromagerie in the 1980s in the Centre region of France. About 45% of its calories come from fat. Roule has been made in the northwestern part of France by Rian's company since the 1980s, has the structure of a slice of Swiss roll and is distinguished by its flavouring of garlic and herbs.

== See also ==
- Boursin cheese
