= Bel Group =

Multinational cheese marketer centered in France

Bel S.A.
- Type: Private
- Traded as: Euronext Paris: UNIBEL
- Industry: Food industry
- Founded: 1865
- Founder: Jules Bel
- Headquarters: Suresnes, Île-de-France
- Area served: Worldwide
- Key people: Cécile Béliot (CEO); Ivan Giraud (CEO of Bel Brands USA)
- Products: Cheese, fruit-based products, plant-based alternatives
- Revenue: ▲€3.83 billion (2025)
- Net income: ▲€107 million (2025)
- Owner: Unibel S.A. (94.70 %); Fiévet-Bel family (4.10 %)
- Number of employees: 11,557 (2021)
- Parent: Unibel
- Website: www.groupe-bel.com

The Bel Group (legally Société Bel) is a global food company headquartered in Suresnes (near Paris), Île-de-France, France. It specializes in portion-controlled cheese, fruit, and plant-based products.

The company "Établissements Jules Bel" were founded in 1865 in Orgelet in the (Jura) Department. The family-owned group became a major player in the sector through brand development, international expansion, and various acquisitions during the 20th century. It later diversified into plant-based and fruit-based products after the 2000s.

Bel is a family-owned multinational group operating in more than 120 countries, with annual revenue of approximately €3.83 billion in the early 2020s. It employs nearly 11,000 people and owns a portfolio of consumer brands including The Laughing Cow (La Vache qui rit), Babybel, Kiri, Boursin, and Pom'Potes. Since 25 January 2022, Bel has been 94.70% owned by the family holding company Unibel, in which the Fiévet family holds an 80% stake and is the controlling shareholder. On May 12, 2022, the group's board of directors appointed Cécile Béliot as Chief Executive Officer (CEO), and renewed Antoine Fiévet's mandate as Chairman of the Board. In 2024, Bel adopted the status of a mission-led company (Entreprise à mission), committing itself to the goal of providing "healthier and more sustainable food for all."

== History ==
=== Origins ===
In 1865, the "Établissements Jules Bel", a business specialising in the maturation and trading of wheels of Comté, was founded in Orgelet, in the Jura department of eastern France. Jules Bel's son, Léon Bel, took over the family business in 1904.

During the First World War, Léon Bel served in a military meat supply unit whose mascot was a laughing beef designed by the French illustrator Benjamin Rabier. A few years later, after learning Swiss techniques for producing processed cheese with a long shelf life that could be stored at room temperature, he again commissioned Rabier to design the visual identity of the commercial brand The Laughing Cow (La Vache qui rit), which was registered in 1921.

Eight years later, in 1929, Bel created its first subsidiary in the United Kingdom. In 1933, another subsidiary was established in Belgium. In 1947, the Bonbel brand was launched. Three years later, in 1950, the company acquired Port Salut, which had been founded by Trappist monks in 1816. In 1952, Bel launched Babybel, one of the group's flagship brands. A new subsidiary was established in Germany in 1959.

Six years later, in 1965, another subsidiary was established in Spain, later becoming Bel España (Bel Spain). The Kiri brand was launched in 1966. A year later, in 1967, Bel established a subsidiary in the Netherlands, later becoming Bel Nederland (Bel Netherlands). The following year, in 1968, Les Fromageries Picon merged with the company.

In 1970, a subsidiary was established in the United States. Two years later, in 1972, it acquired Samos and launched the Sylphide brand. The following year, in 1973, Bel acquired Crowson in the United Kingdom, which later became Bel UK. That same year, it established a subsidiary in Switzerland, later becoming Bel Suisse. In 1974, Bel established a subsidiary in Morocco, later known as SIALIM.

In 1976, it acquired the Société anonyme des fermiers réunis (SAFR) and its subsidiaries, including the Rouy and Le Roitelet brands. The following year, it acquired an Italian company, later to become known as Bel Cademartori and launched Mini Babybel. In 1978, Bel acquired a company in Sweden, later becoming Bel Sverige (Bel Sweden).

During the 1980s, Bel continued its international expansion through acquisitions and the establishment of subsidiaries, particularly in Europe and North America. By 1989, it acquired Adler in Germany, later becoming Bel Adler (Edelcreme).

It then launched Mini Bonbel in 1990. Between the 1980s and the 2000s, Bel continued its international expansion through acquisitions and the establishment of subsidiaries, particularly in Italy, Spain, Portugal, Poland, Egypt and the United States. Several local companies and brands, including Maredsous, Limiano and Kaukauna, were integrated into the group. During the same period, Bel also divested several non-core businesses, including the Picon cheese dairy and certain Manchego cheese production activities.

In 1998, Bel established a subsidiary in Egypt (Bel Egypt) and acquired the Middle East Food Industry, later becoming Bel Egypt Food Company. It also acquired Kraft Chorzele in Poland, later to becoming Bel Polska (Bel Poland) and launched Mini Babybel in Maasdam.

By 2000, it acquired Želetavská Sýrárna in the Czech Republic (Želetava, Apetitto) and Zempmilk in Slovakia (Karička). The following year, in 2001, it established a subsidiary in Algeria, known as Bel Algeria.

Throughout the early 2000s, Bel continued its international expansion in Greece, the Czech Republic, Slovakia, Syria and Tunisia. In 2002, it also acquired the assets of Merkts and Owl's Nest brands in the United States.

That same year, Bel strengthened its European presence through the acquisition of the Dutch Leerdammer Group from Royal Wessanen, together with its subsidiaries in Germany, France, Italy, the United Kingdom, Belgium and the Czech Republic.

In 2003, it terminated the Manchego activities through its Queserías Ibéricas subsidiary. Two years later, in 2005, it terminated the activities carried out under the Cademartori brand. Meanwhile, it established a subsidiary in Syria, known as Bel Syria.

In 2007, Bel also acquired the Boursin brand from Unilever for approximately €400 million.

By 2009, it had changed its corporate logo.

=== Diversification and continued expansion ===
In 2015, it acquired a 69.82% stake in Safilait, a Moroccan dairy and cheese company.

In October 2016, Bel acquired a 65% stake in the MOM Group for €850 million. MOM owns several food brands, including Pom’Potes, Gogo squeeZ’, Mont Blanc and Materne.

Throughout 2020s, the group increasingly positioned its portfolio around the healthy snacking market, focusing on dairy, fruit and plant-based products while developing new formats, flavours and nutritional offerings. In March 2020, Bel acquired All In Foods, a company specialising in plant-based alternatives and owner of the Nature & Moi brand. In October of that year, it announced plans to introduce plant-based versions of Boursin and Babybel.

In March 2021, Bel announced an agreement with Lactalis under which it sold the Leerdammer brand, along with its German, Italian, and Ukrainian subsidiaries, in exchange for the 23.16% stake that Lactalis held in Bel.

The following month, Bel launched the Nurishh brand, which replaced Nature & Moi in its plant-based product portfolio.

Bel acquired the remaining interest in the MOM Group in 2022.

In the first half of 2022, Bel's net profit fell to €34.2 million, nearly 50% lower than during the same period in 2021, mainly as a result of inflation. Revenue remained broadly stable at €1.6 billion.

That same year, Bel acquired the Chinese cheese manufacturer Shandong Junjun Cheese. It also established a joint venture with the Indian food group Britannia Industries, acquiring a 49% stake in the newly created subsidiary.

In 2024, Bel became a mission-led company (an Entreprise à mission), a legal status for French companies that formally incorporate social and environmental objectives into their corporate purpose. Bel stated that its mission was to provide "healthier and more sustainable food for all". The company also launched a global employee share ownership plan.

Bel Group plans to generate half of its sales from plant-based options by 2050.

Also in 2024, Bel announced a partnership with Dassault Systèmes to accelerate the digitalisation of its industrial operations through digital technologies and artificial intelligence.

In December 2024, members of the Fiévet, Sauvin and Dufort families announced that they had ended several years of disagreements and entered into a shareholders' agreement following a joint tender offer for Unibel. Together, they controlled 98.52% of Unibel's share capital and 93.54% of its voting rights.

Bel continued to expand in Asia through investments and partnerships in Indonesia, India and China.

In 2026, Bel announced a US$200 million investment to double the production capacity of its Babybel manufacturing facility in the United States. The United States was Bel's largest market at the time, accounting for approximately one-third of the group's sales. Later that year, Bel acquired the Brainiac and Little Brainiac brands from Ingenuity Foods, expanding its presence in the United States children's snack market and into functional nutrition products. In the first half of 2026, Bel reported consolidated net sales of €1.877 billion, representing organic growth of 4.2% compared with the same period in 2025. Recurring operating income reached €137 million, up 22.3% organically.

== Products and brands ==
Bel operates in three main food categories: dairy products, fruit products and plant-based alternatives. Many of the group's products are marketed in single-portion formats, which have become one of its defining characteristics. The company has positioned portion-controlled products as part of its nutritional strategy, while expanding its core brands into dairy-free, lower-fat, protein-enriched and functional products.

Bel's portfolio includes around thirty international and regional brands, including Adler Edelcreme, Apéricube, Babybel, Bonbel, Boursin, Cantadou, , Karička, Karper, Kaukauna, Kiri, Limiano, Maredsous, Materne, Mont Blanc, Merkts, Nurishh, Picon, Pom'Potes, Price's, Régal Picon, Smetanito, Želetava, Sylphide, Syrokrém, Terra Nostra, Toastinette, The Laughing Cow and Wispride.

== Operations ==
Bel employs approximately 11,000 people and operates around 30 manufacturing facilities in about 15 countries.

In France, the group's production facilities are located in Lons-le-Saunier, Dole, Sablé-sur-Sarthe, Évron, Croisy-sur-Eure, Chef-du-Pont, Vendôme, La Ferté-Bernard, Mayenne and Boué.

Its headquarters are in Chicago and New York, with other plants across North America.

The group also operates manufacturing facilities across Europe, North America, Africa and Asia, producing both dairy and fruit products for international markets.

Bel's global research, innovation and development centre is located in Vendôme, France. The centre develops new products, improves manufacturing processes and designs new packaging solutions for the group's international brands.

== Corporate identity ==
Bel introduced a new corporate identity and logo in October 2019.

Bel Group logo.

== Cultural heritage ==
Bel supports several cultural and heritage initiatives related to its history and brands, including a museum dedicated to The Laughing Cow, located in Lons-Le-Saunier, France. Opened in 2009, the museum presents the history of the brand through exhibitions, archives and educational activities, and regularly hosts cultural events organised in partnership with Lab'Bel.

The Bel Foundation was established in 2008 by the Bel group and its reference shareholder, Unibel. It supports projects around the world promoting healthy eating among children and encouraging sustainable food practices.

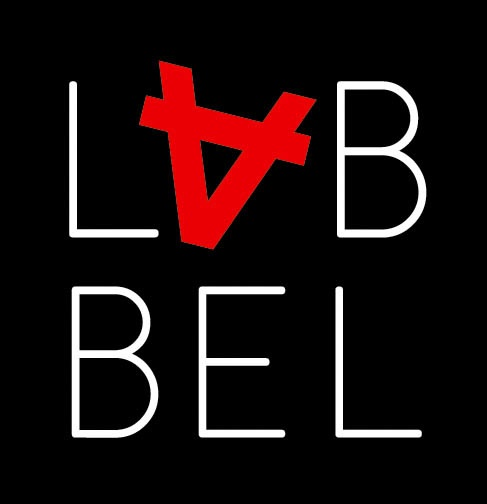
Lab'Bel's logo

In 2010, Lab'Bel, an art programme supporting contemporary artists through exhibitions, commissions and cultural partnerships, was created. Throughout its history, Bel has several supported artists associated with its brands, including illustrators Benjamin Rabier, creator of the original Laughing Cow image, Francisque Poulbotand celebrated animator Paul Grimault. Bel sponsors a museum dedicated to its legendary cow – La Maison de La vache qui rit (The Laughing Cow Museum), in Lons-le-Saunier – which also houses special events hosted by Lab'Bel.

Among its projects, Lab'Bel has organised exhibitions in collaboration with the Palais de Tokyo in Paris.

== See also ==
- List of cheesemakers
