= Tatayet =

Belgian puppet

Tatayet (French pronunciation: [tatajɛ]) is a Belgian puppet, operated by Belgian ventriloquist Michel Dejeneffe since 15 December 1975. Dejeneffe performed the character on stage in theater shows for more than 40 years and recorded comedy records with him.

== TV show ==
In the 1980s Tatayet became more prominent in Walloon media thanks to the popular children's TV show Le Tatayet Show (1986-1992), which was broadcast on the RTBF. He even had a minor hit dance single called Tous au Cimetière (1986).

== Media adaptations ==
In 1990 two comic books albums, C'est pas moi, c'est lui (1990) and C'est pas lui c'est moi were made about the TV series, written by Raoul Cauvin and drawn by Olivier Saive.

== Retirement ==
In 2017 Dejeneffe announced he would retire the character, as well as quit performing on stage.
