= Sosoye =

Sosoye Sôzoye (Walloon)
- Village
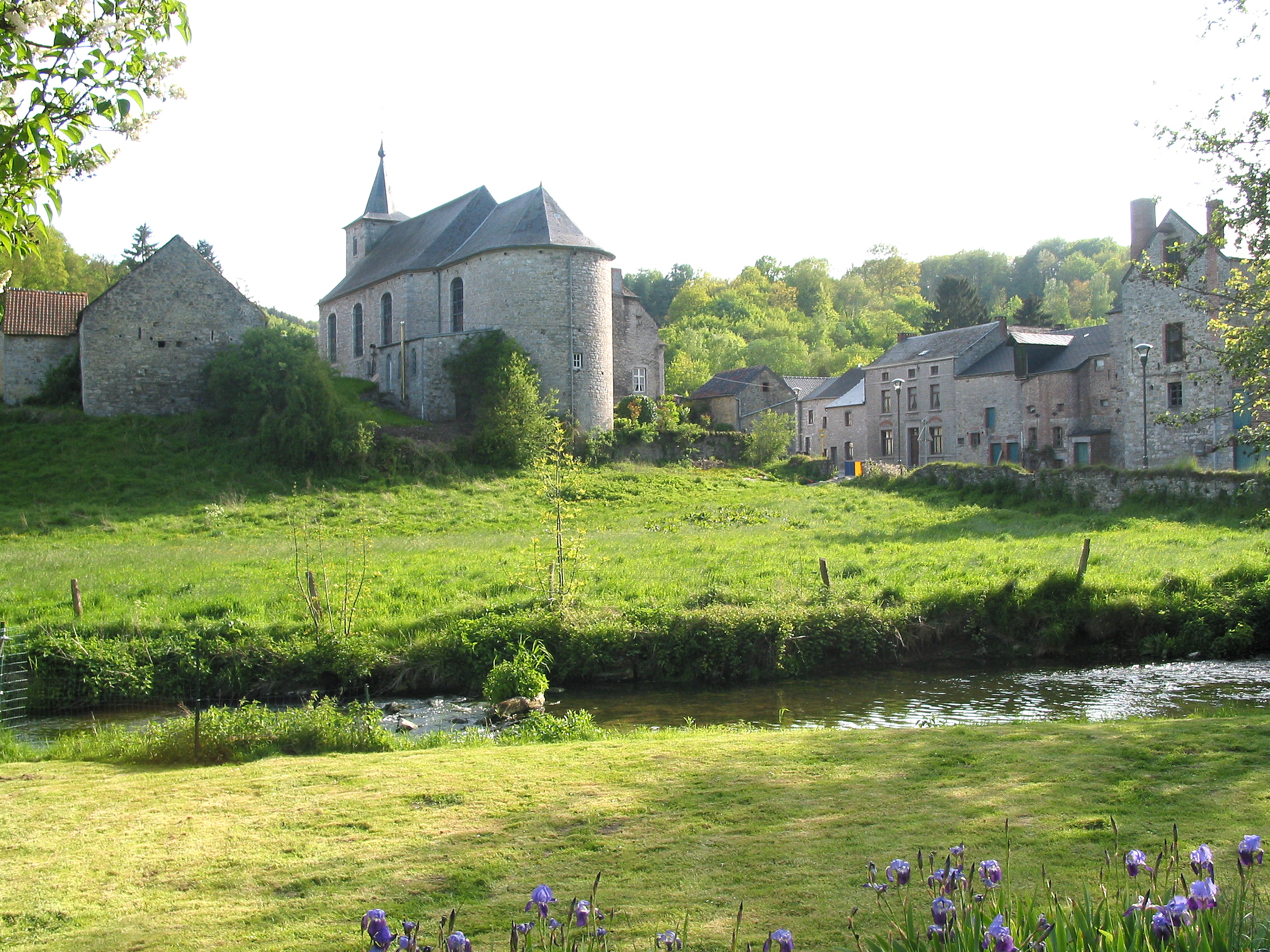
- Sosoye

- Location within Belgium
- Coordinates: 50°17′N 4°46′E
- Country: Belgium
- Region: Wallonia
- Province: Namur
- Municipality: Anhée

Population (2007)
  - Total: 151

Sosoye (French pronunciation: [sozwa]; Walloon: Sôzoye) is a village of Wallonia and a district of the municipality of Anhée, located in the province of Namur, Belgium.

Sosoye lies in the valley of the Molignée and had 151 inhabitants in 2007.
