= Orgelet =

Commune in Bourgogne-Franche-Comté, France

- Commune
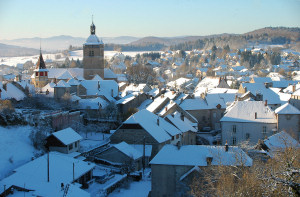
- A general view of Orgelet

- Coat of arms
- Location of Orgelet
- Location within France Location within Bourgogne-Franche-Comté
- Coordinates: 46°31′23″N 5°36′40″E
- Country: France
- Region: Bourgogne-Franche-Comté
- Department: Jura
- Arrondissement: Lons-le-Saunier
- Canton: Moirans-en-Montagne

Government
  - Mayor (2020–2026): Jean-Paul Duthion
- Area^{1}: 23.11 km^{2} (8.92 sq mi)
- Highest elevation: 653 m (2,142 ft)
- Lowest elevation: 374 m (1,227 ft)
- Population (2023): 1,554
  - Density: 67.24/km^{2} (174.2/sq mi)
- Time zone: UTC+01:00 (CET)
  - Summer (DST): UTC+02:00 (CEST)
- INSEE/Postal code: 39397 /39270
- ^{1} French Land Register data, which excludes lakes, ponds, glaciers > 1 km^{2} (0.386 sq mi or 247 acres) and river estuaries.

Orgelet (French pronunciation: [ɔʁʒəlɛ]; Arpitan: Ourdzelet) is a commune in the Jura department in Bourgogne-Franche-Comté in eastern France. It was created in 1973 by the merger of two former communes: Orgelet-le-Bourget and Sézéria. The town is recognized as a remarkable heritage site (Site patrimonial remarquable). The church Notre-Dame de l'Assomption dates from the 13th-17th century.

== Surrounding communes ==
Some adjacent communes of Orgelet are:

- Présilly
- Senay - Hamlet of Presilly

== Population ==
Historical population
Year	Pop.	±% p.a.
1968	1,696	—
1975	1,711	+0.13%
1982	1,622	−0.76%
1990	1,700	+0.59%
1999	1,686	−0.09%
2007	1,740	+0.39%
2012	1,593	−1.75%
2017	1,596	+0.04%
2023	1,554	−0.44%
2024	1,625	+4.57%
Source: INSEE

== See also ==
- Communes of the Jura department
