= Chambéria =

Commune in Bourgogne-Franche-Comté, France

- Commune
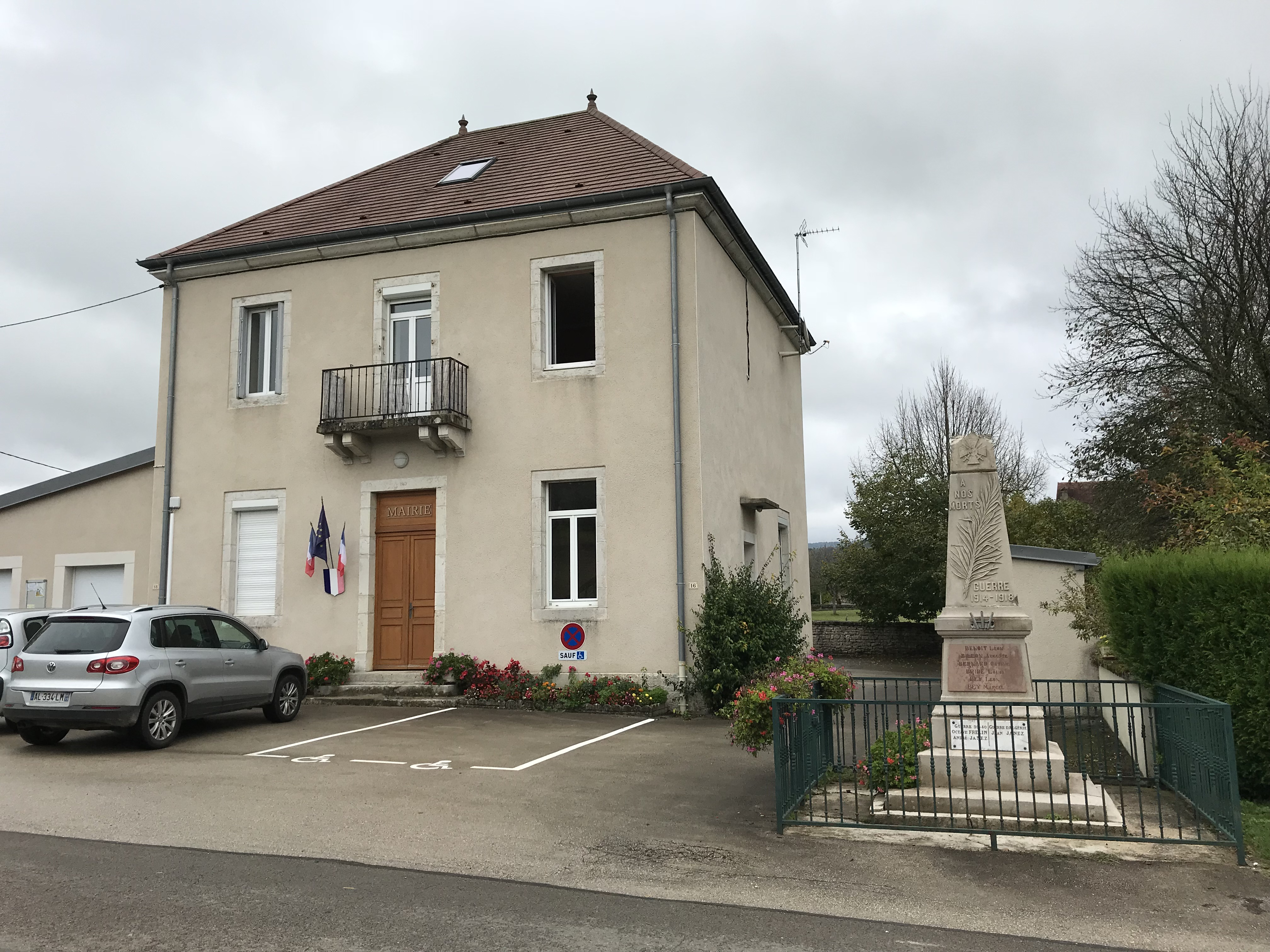
- The town hall in Chambéria
- Location of Chambéria
- Location within France Location within Bourgogne-Franche-Comté
- Coordinates: 46°27′53″N 5°33′39″E
- Country: France
- Region: Bourgogne-Franche-Comté
- Department: Jura
- Arrondissement: Lons-le-Saunier
- Canton: Moirans-en-Montagne

Government
  - Mayor (2020–2026): Jean-Louis Favier
- Area^{1}: 14.67 km^{2} (5.66 sq mi)
- Highest elevation: 582 m (1,909 ft)
- Lowest elevation: 356 m (1,168 ft)
- Population (2023): 200
  - Density: 14/km^{2} (35/sq mi)
- Time zone: UTC+01:00 (CET)
  - Summer (DST): UTC+02:00 (CEST)
- INSEE/Postal code: 39092 /39270
- ^{1} French Land Register data, which excludes lakes, ponds, glaciers > 1 km^{2} (0.386 sq mi or 247 acres) and river estuaries.

Chambéria (French pronunciation: [ʃɑ̃beʁja]) is a commune in the Jura department in Bourgogne-Franche-Comté in eastern France.

== Population ==
Historical population
Year	Pop.	±% p.a.
1968	182	—
1975	154	−2.36%
1982	134	−1.97%
1990	135	+0.09%
1999	149	+1.10%
2007	162	+1.05%
2012	167	+0.61%
2017	175	+0.94%
2023	200	+2.25%
Source: INSEE

== See also ==
- Communes of the Jura department
