= Maurice Fiévet =

French explorer and painter

Maurice Fiévet was a French adventurer and painter of genre specialised in ethnography of Africa and Cambodia.

== Biography ==
=== From high school teacher to adventurer in the Hoggar mountains (1947-1949) ===
Maurice Fiévet was born on 20 August 1921, in the state of Montana, in the United States where his parents had emigrated after the First World War. He was probably named after his uncle Maurice Fiévet, who had been cited for his heroism in 1916 with the 128th Infantry Division of the French Army during the Battle of Verdun of the aforementioned war.

After his family returned to France, he went on to study at Ecole des Beaux Arts until he left to join the underground Resistance during World Word II. After the war ended in 1945, he finally graduated, with a degree in hand and a new wife, his fellow student Jeannette Demont,.

After the Second World War, Maurice Fiévet became a geography teacher at the high school back in his hometown of Bruay-en-Artois in Northern France while his wife taught mathematics.

In 1947, he and his wife sold all their belongings to travel to the Hoggar mountains in the footsteps of Charles de Foucauld, and he was immediately recognized in the French magazine Nuit et Jour as a "young explorer and talentful painter". Their travels led them from Morocco to Nigeria through the Hoggar and Tibesti. The exploit of their adventures was rewarded by the second edition of the Louis Liotard prize in 1949 from the hands of French president Vincent Auriol.

=== Ethnological mission in Nigeria and Western Africa (1949-1959) ===
Later in 1949, the British colonial government commissioned him to provide ethnographic documentation of Nigerian peoples, rather than Nigerian artist Ben Enwonu who remained more distant from politics and was critical of the work of the latter. Various official publications resulted from this work, as illustrations of agricultural scenes. An exhibition of his oil paintings is organized at the Imperial Institute in London in August 1950.

Nigerian British colony stamps 1953 of the issue "Country Motives - Queen Elizabeth II of the United Kingdom" and "Pictorials" by Maurice Fiévet

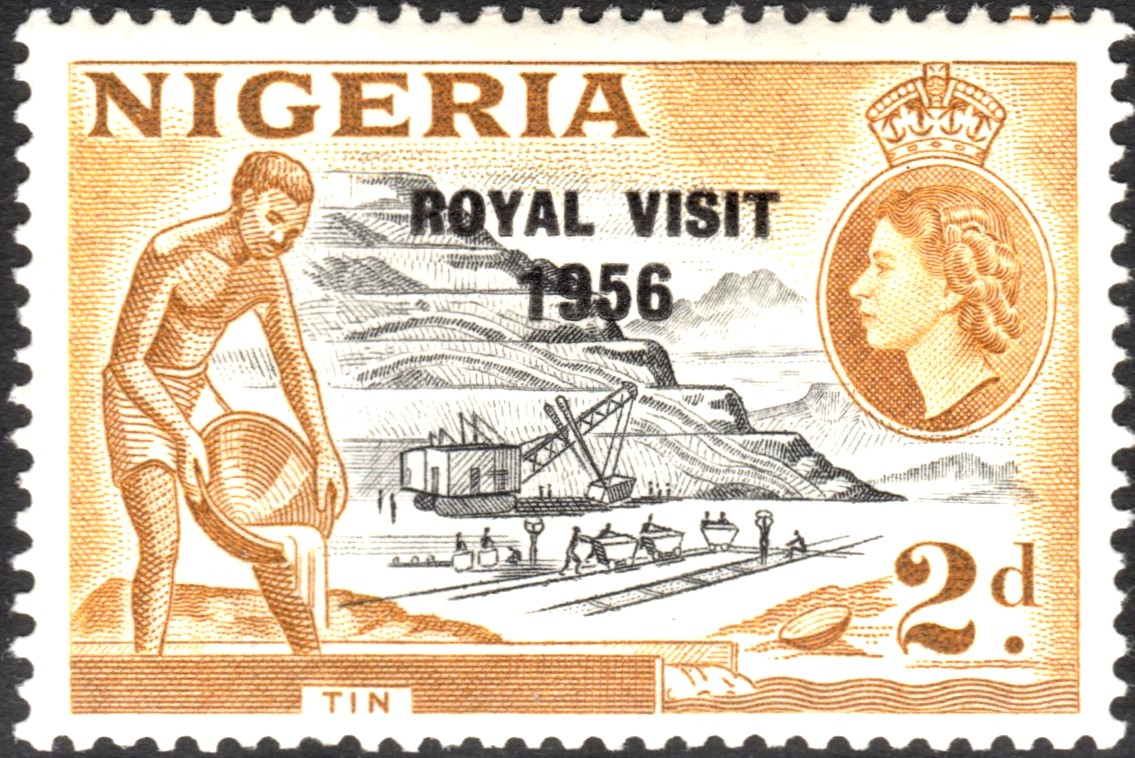
Stamp with a drawing with a scenery at the tin mining (at the pithead) and a portrait of Queen Elizabeth II of the United Kingdom in oval with crown.

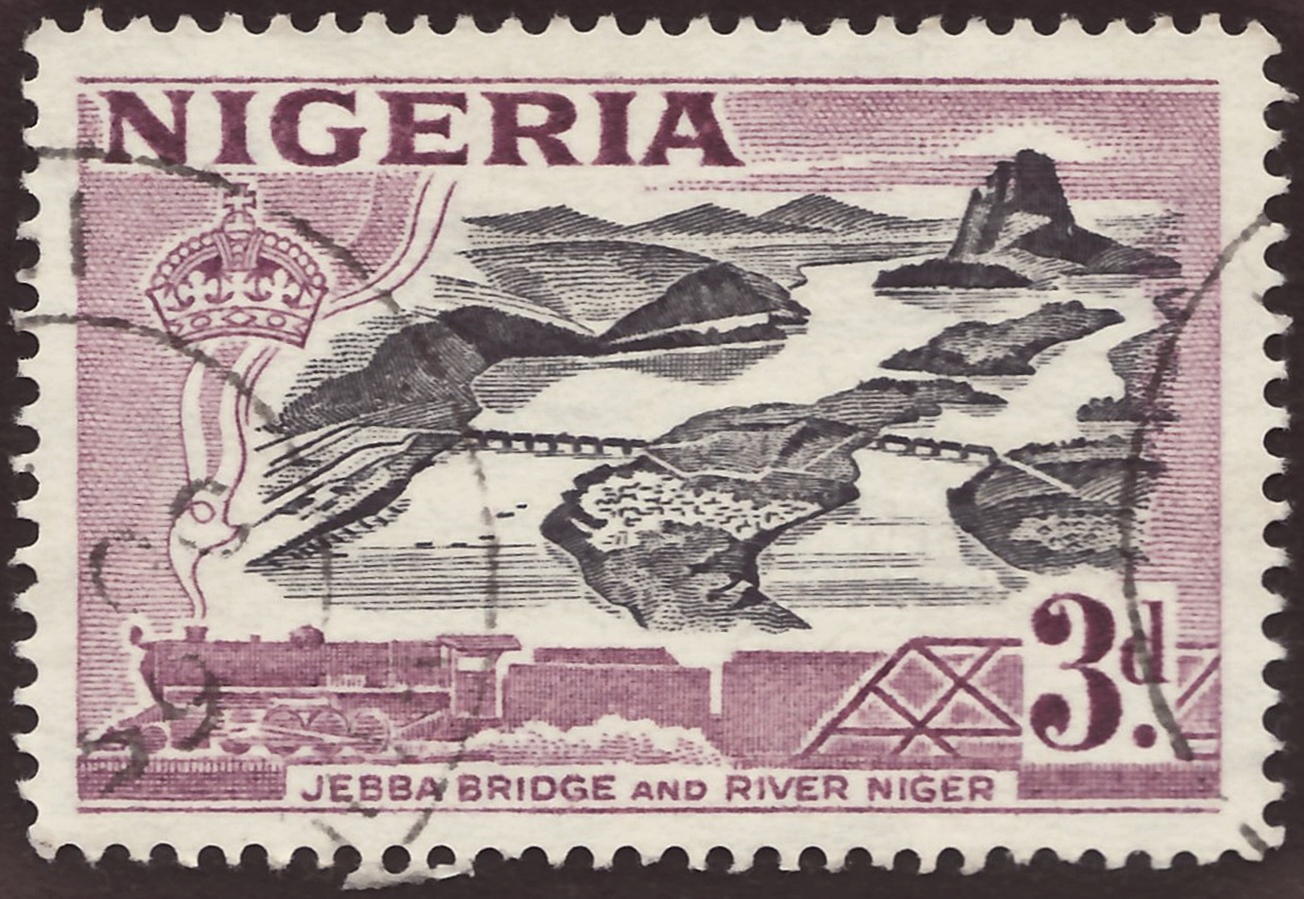
Stamp with a drawing of the Jebba bridge (railway bridge over the Niger River, built 1909–1915) as two-sections bridge over the island Jebba in the river Niger.

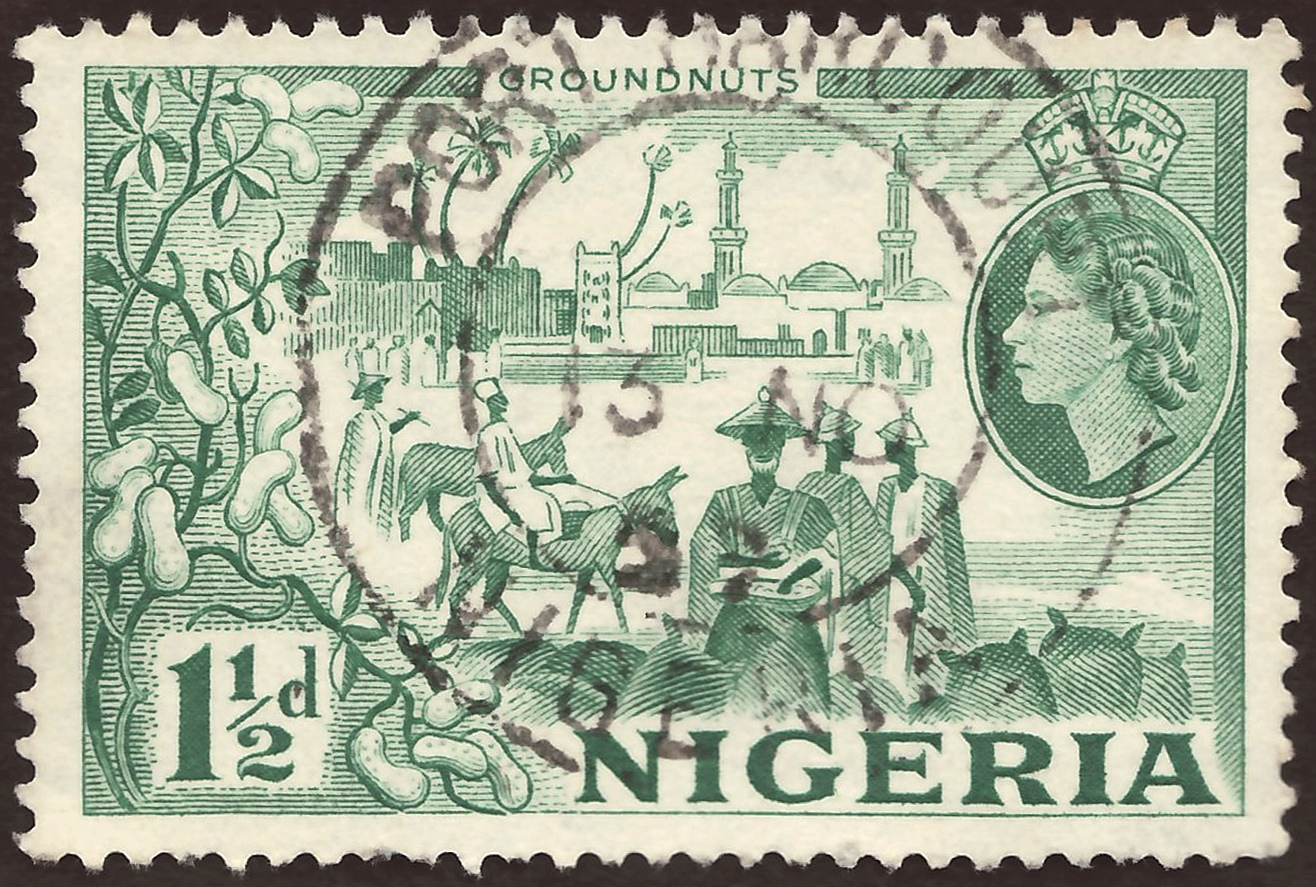
Stamp with a scenery at the ground nuts harvest, branches of Arachis hypogaea with fruits.

With his wife Jeannette, they continued their artistic missions in Africa. In September 1951, they began a trip by boat on the rivers of Nigeria, which, over the next through three years, took them through a large part of West Africa, publishing reports of their travel in Nigeria Magazine in 1953. The same year, he was asked to create new pictorials for the official postage stamps for the Commonwealth of Nigeria which had not been updated after George VI died in 1952 .

During that trip, their child Didier known as "Bichon" was born. Pictures of his little baby were used in an article published in Paris Match, which inspired the philosophical reflection on semiology of Roland Barthes in Mythologies which was not the intention of the Fiévet family.

In April 1957, Maurice Fiévet's work was exhibited at the British Council in the capital city of Accra in Ghana. He completed another project with his wife Jeannette in Benin in 1959.

=== Painting Angkor in Cambodia (1960-1970) ===
Maurice Fiévet, a French artist, provide a visual, chronological narrative of the history of ancient Cambodia from the founding of Angkor. They were drawn with the advice of French archaeologists George Cœdès and Bernard Philippe Groslier based on the accounts of daily life found in the writings of Chinese ambassador Zhou Daguan, Khmer inscriptions and the data gathered from archeology.

The drawings gained popularity after being published in the National Geographic Magazine issue of March 1960 to illustrate an article by chief foreign editorial staff Robert Moore who described Angkor as the "jewel of the jungle". While most of Khmer art was colourless, the creative work of Maurice Fievet brought new life to ordinary scenes of the Angkorian empire.

=== Back to a Africa (1970-...) ===
In the 1970s, as the Civil War broke out in Cambodia, Maurice Fievet returned to Africa. With his wife Jeannette, he worked on a documentary which tried to recover the past fame of their child with a new name, Francis aux Paradis perdus "Carrefour de Savane" (ORTF, 1972). He ended up breaking up with his wife and leaving with Monique Dumonté, the sound engineer for their documentary film. Together, they travelled to Mozambique and wrote a book in 1973 entitled Tesouro Selvagem de Mozambique.

After being a member of the Société de Géographie and its Club of Explorers since the 1950s, Maurice Fiévet died in 1997.

== Links ==
- Davis, Kent (2011-05-08). "Artistic Visions of Angkor by Maurice Fievet". Devata.org - Apsara & Devata of Angkor Wat.
- Cohen, Bernard. "Maurice Fievet, Visions of Ancient Angkor". Angkora Database.
