= Entreprise à Mission =

Business legal framework in France

Entreprise à mission is a French legal framework in which businesses pursue a set social and environmental purpose with specific sustainability goals.
