= Anhée =

Municipality in Wallonia, Belgium

Anhée Anhêye (Walloon)
- Municipality
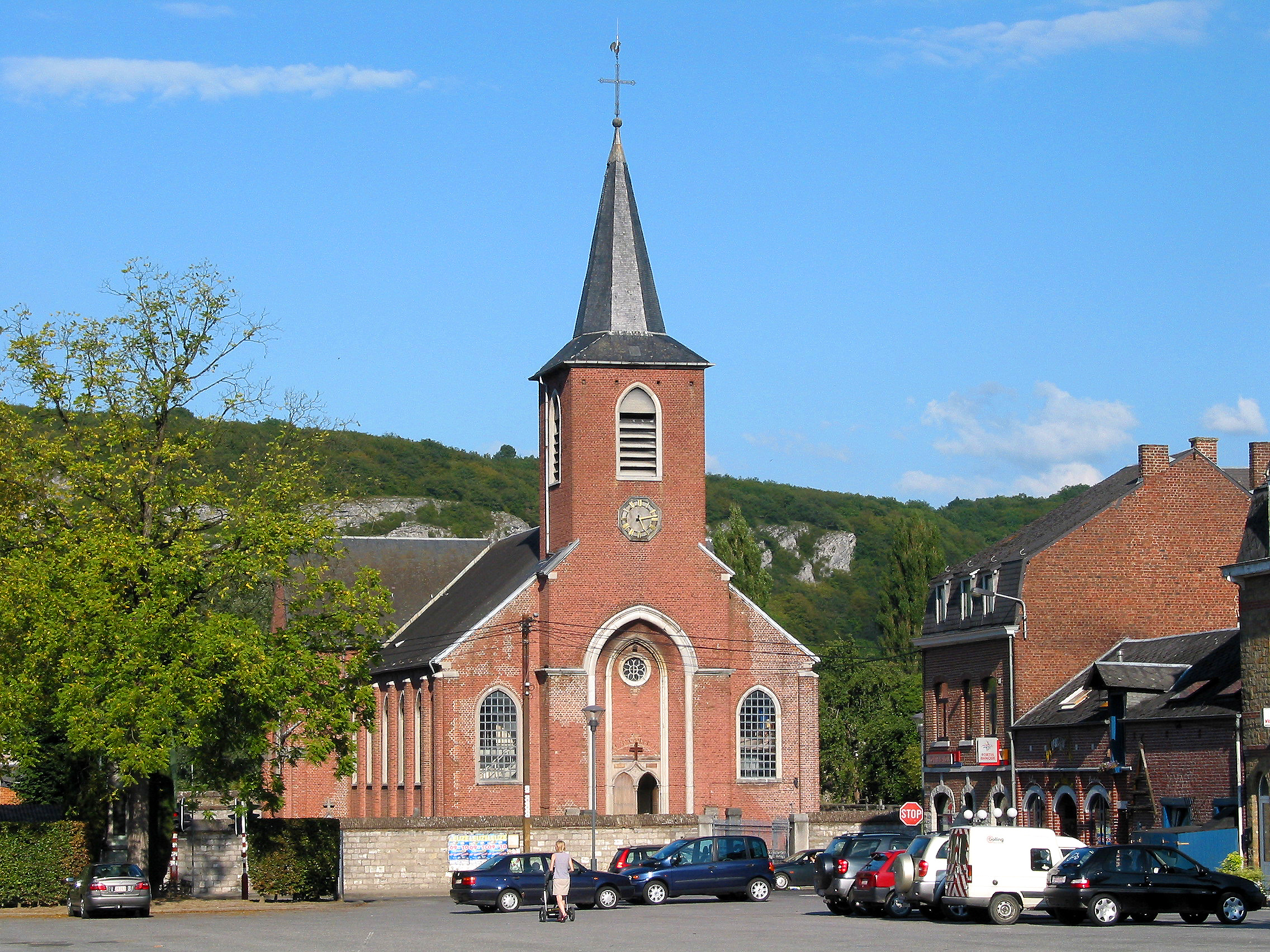
- St. Martin's Church

- Flag Coat of arms

- Location of Anhée in Namur province
- Interactive map of Anhée
- Location in Belgium
- Coordinates: 50°19′N 04°53′E
- Country: Belgium
- Community: French Community
- Region: Wallonia
- Province: Namur
- Arrondissement: Dinant

Government
  - Mayor: Luc Piette
  - Governing party: VIC

Area
  - Total: 66.03 km^{2} (25.49 sq mi)

Population (2018-01-01)
  - Total: 7,117
  - Density: 107.8/km^{2} (279.2/sq mi)
- Postal codes: 5537
- NIS code: 91005
- Area codes: 082
- Website: www.anhee.be

Anhée (French pronunciation: [ɑ̃.e] ; Walloon: Anhêye) is a municipality of Wallonia located in the province of Namur, Belgium.

On 1 January 2006 the municipality had 6,934 inhabitants. The total area is 65.67 km^{2}, giving a population density of 106 inhabitants per km^{2}.

The municipality consists of the following districts: Anhée, Annevoie-Rouillon, Bioul, Denée, Haut-le-Wastia, Sosoye and Warnant.

The village of Bioul contains Vaxelaire Castle (Château Vaxelaire). Maredsous Abbey and Maredret Abbey are located near Denée.

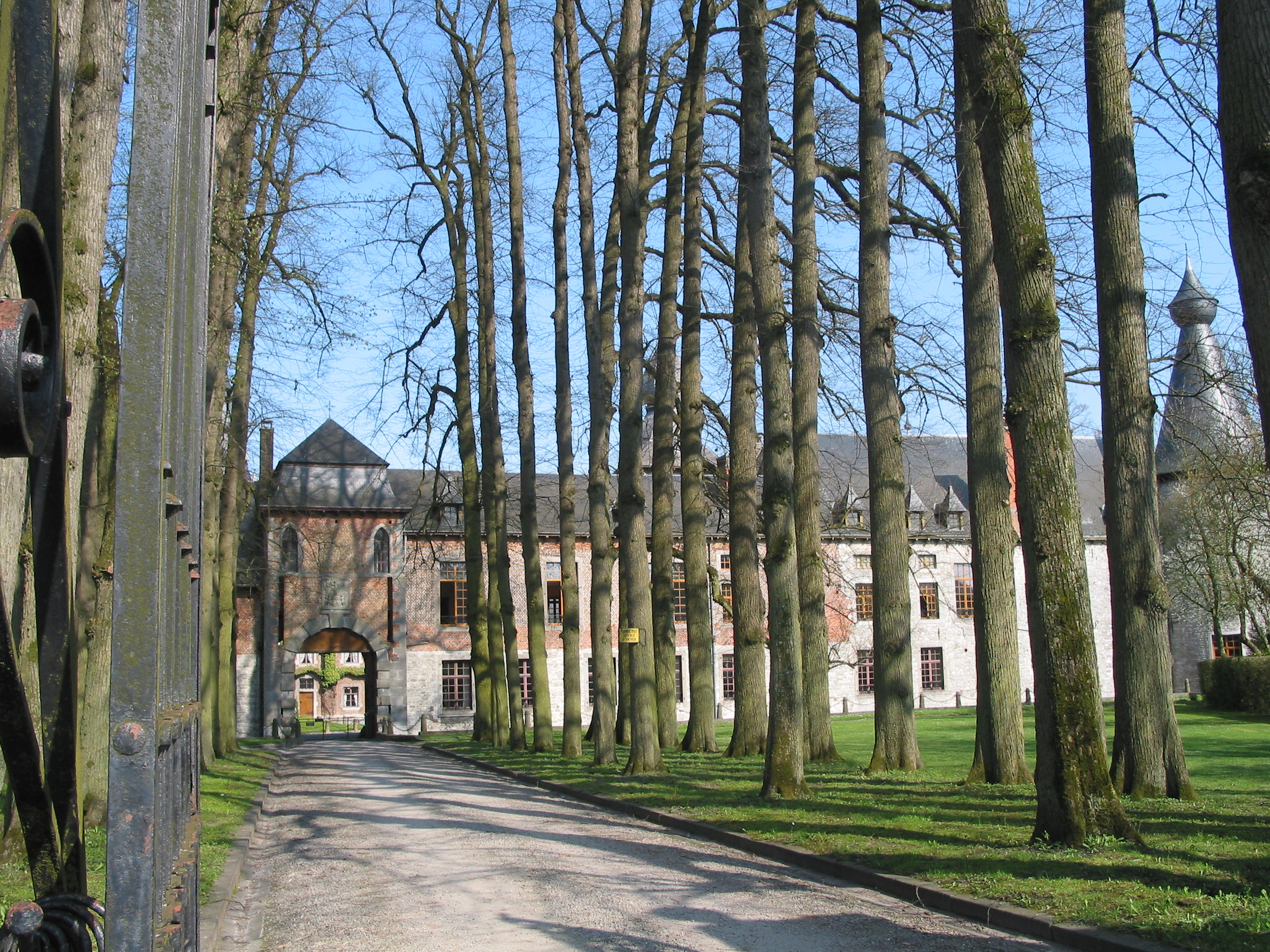
Vaxelaire Castle in Bioul

== See also ==
- List of protected heritage sites in Anhée
