= Présilly, Jura =

Commune in Bourgogne-Franche-Comté, France

Présilly
- Commune
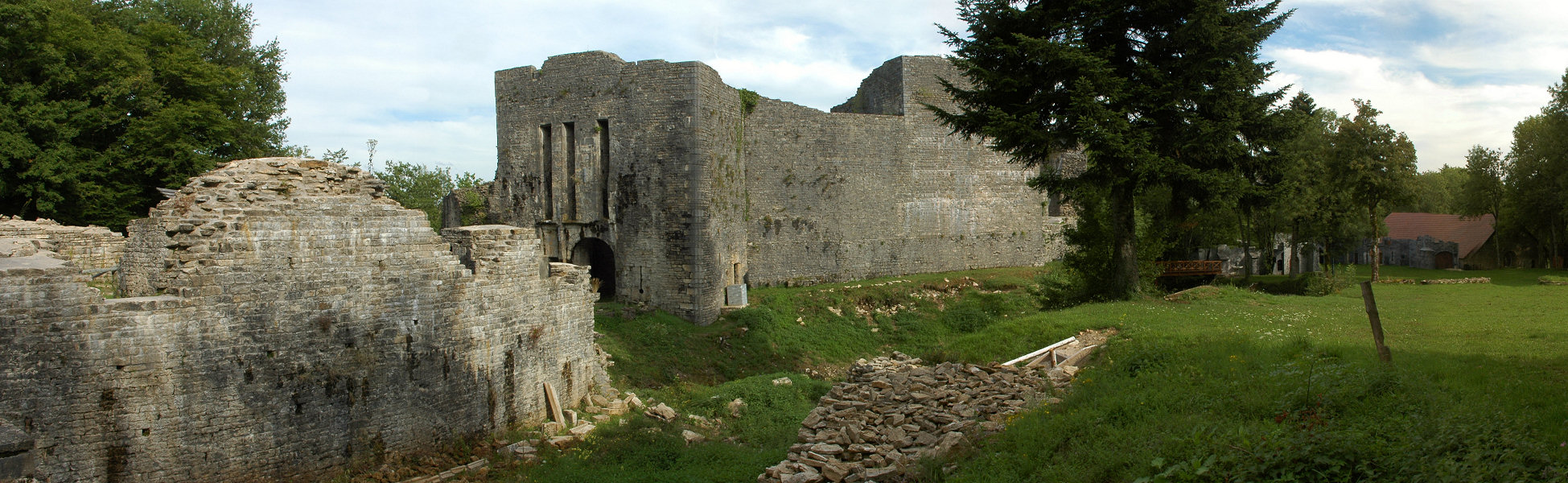
- Ruins of the chateau
- Location of Présilly
- Location within France Location within Bourgogne-Franche-Comté
- Coordinates: 46°33′26″N 5°35′12″E
- Country: France
- Region: Bourgogne-Franche-Comté
- Department: Jura
- Arrondissement: Lons-le-Saunier
- Canton: Moirans-en-Montagne

Government
  - Mayor (2020–2026): Richard Hotz
- Area^{1}: 11.23 km^{2} (4.34 sq mi)
- Highest elevation: 701 m (2,300 ft)
- Lowest elevation: 480 m (1,570 ft)
- Population (2023): 111
  - Density: 9.88/km^{2} (25.6/sq mi)
- Time zone: UTC+01:00 (CET)
  - Summer (DST): UTC+02:00 (CEST)
- INSEE/Postal code: 39443 /39270
- ^{1} French Land Register data, which excludes lakes, ponds, glaciers > 1 km^{2} (0.386 sq mi or 247 acres) and river estuaries.

Présilly (French pronunciation: [pʁeziji]) is a commune in the Jura department in Bourgogne-Franche-Comté in eastern France. It is known for the ruins of a castle dating from the 12th to 17th centuries, where every summer open air theatrical shows are organized in the summer. The castle is surrounded by a discovery trail to recall what castle life was like.

== Population ==
Historical population
| Year | Pop. | ±% p.a. |
|---|---|---|
| 1968 | 122 | — |
| 1975 | 105 | −2.12% |
| 1982 | 107 | +0.27% |
| 1990 | 107 | +0.00% |
| 1999 | 102 | −0.53% |
| 2007 | 101 | −0.12% |
| 2012 | 121 | +3.68% |
| 2017 | 132 | +1.76% |
| 2023 | 111 | −2.85% |
Source: INSEE

== See also ==
- Communes of the Jura department
