= Akshay =

Akshay may refer to:

- S. L. Akshay (1987–2026), Indian first-class cricketer
- Akshay Anand (born 1957), Bollywood and television actor
- Akshay Anand Chand
- Akshay Chandra Sarkar (1846–1917), poet, an editor and a literary critic of Bengali literature
- Akshay Darekar (born 1988), cricketer
- Akshay Dewalkar, male Indian badminton player who competed at 2012 Japan Super Series
- Akshay Dogra (born 1981), Indian actor and producer working in the television industry
- Akshay Kapoor (born: Swapnil Gohil) (born 1980), Indian actor
- Akshay Kumar Datta, born in Chupi in Bardhaman, Bengali writer
- Akshay Kumar Boral (1860–1919), Bengali poet and writer
- Akshay Khanna (born 1975), Indian film actor
- Akshay H. Mehta (born 1945), former judge of the Gujarat High Court
- Akshay Kumar (born 1967), Indian actor, producer and martial artist who has appeared in over a hundred Hindi films
- Akshay Kumar Maitreya (1861–1930), Indian historian and social worker from Bengal
- Akshay Kumar Sen, one of the lay disciples of Sri Ramakrishna, the 19th century Bengali mystic and saint
- Akshay Mall (born 1992), Indian footballer
- Akshay Oberoi (born 1985), Hindi film actor of Punjabi origin
- Akshay Pratap Singh (born 1970), Indian politician from Pratapgarh in Uttar Pradesh
- Akshay Sethi (born 1980), Indian model and television actor
- Akshay Venkatesh (born 1981), Indian Australian mathematician
- Akshay Wakhare (born 1985), Indian cricketer
- Akshay Yadav, member of the Samajwadi Party, winner in the Indian general elections, 2014

== See also ==
- INS Akshay, ships of the Indian Navy
- Indian Akshay Urja Day, August 20 annually, awareness campaign about the developments of renewable energy in India
- Akshay Tritiiya, a holy day for Hindus and Jains
- Akshay Vat or Akshayavat or Akshay Vat ("the indestructible banyan tree"), a sacred fig tree mentioned in the Hindu mythology
- Akhshay
- Aksay (disambiguation)
- Aksha (disambiguation)
- Akshaya
