= Temple Mountain =

Temple Mountain or temple mountain may refer to:

== Places ==
- Temple Mountain (Idaho), a mountain in Boundary County, Idaho
- Temple Mountain (New Hampshire), a mountain in Hillsborough County, New Hampshire
  - Temple Mountain Ski Area, a former downhill ski area in New Hampshire
- Temple Mountain (Utah), a mountain in Emery County, Utah

== Other ==
- Temple mountain, a scheme for temple construction in Khmer architecture
- Temple Mountain Member, the lowest geologic strata within the Chinle Formation of the western United States

== See also ==
- Solomon's Temple (disambiguation)
- Al-Aqsa (disambiguation)
- Jewish temple (disambiguation)
- Mount Temple (Alberta)
- Temple Mount, religious hill in Jerusalem
