= Solomon's Temple (disambiguation) =

Solomon's Temple was a temple in Jerusalem described in the Hebrew Bible.

Solomon's Temple may also refer to:

- Solomon's Temple, Aizawl, a Christian church in India
- Solomon's Temple, Buxton, a Victorian hill marker in England
- Solomon Temple (Grand Canyon), a summit in the Grand Canyon, USA
- Temple of Solomon (São Paulo), a colossal replica in Brazil
- Youngstown Ridge, a mountain in Pennsylvania, United States, consisting of Sugarbrush Ridge and Solomon's Temple Ridge

== See also ==
- Temple Mountain (disambiguation)
- Jewish temple (disambiguation)
- al-Aqsa (disambiguation)
