= Unity Township, Pennsylvania =

Township in Pennsylvania, US

Coordinates: 40°14′00″N 79°21′59″W

- Township
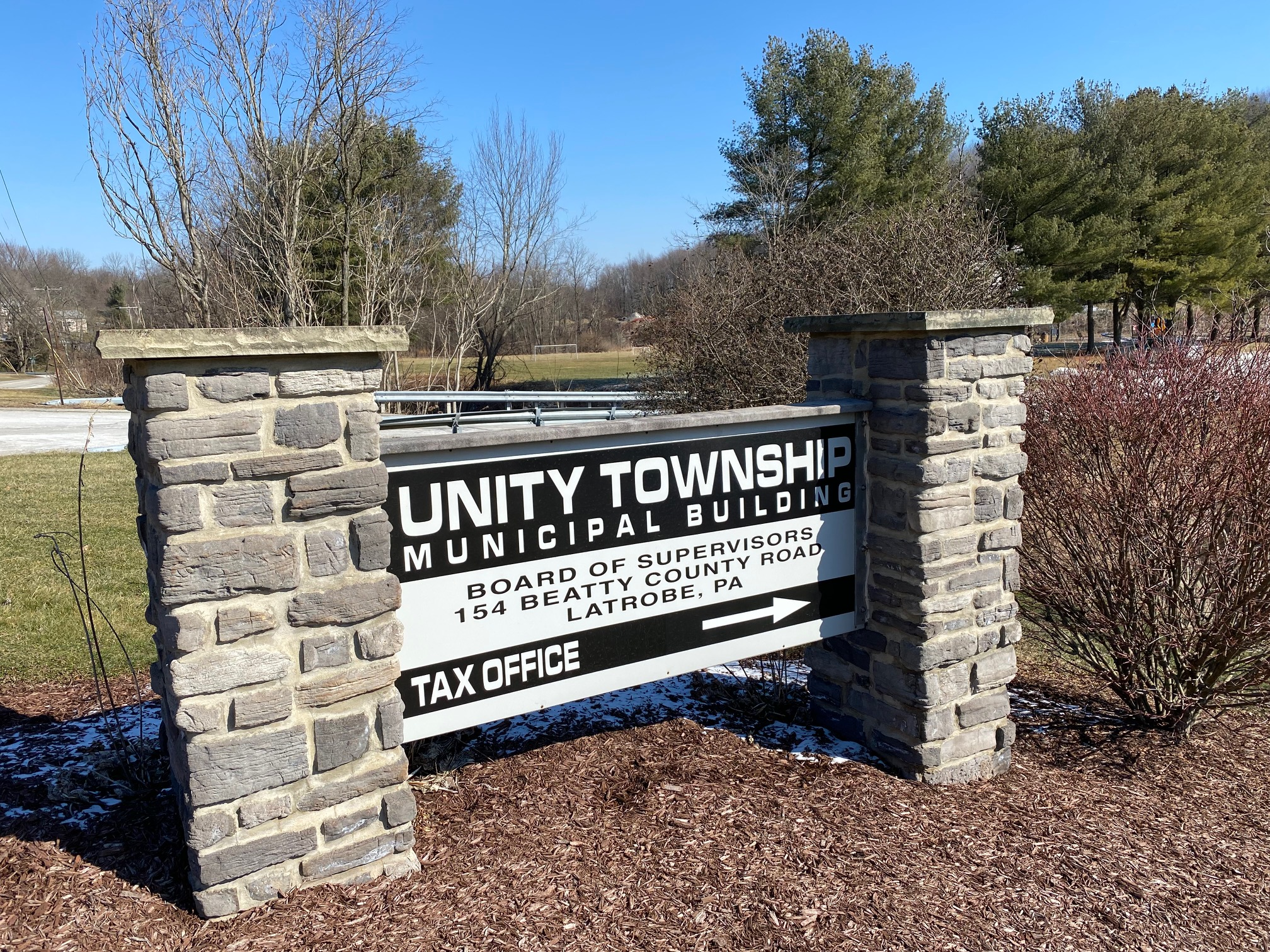
- Township office, Beatty County Road and Beatty Village Road

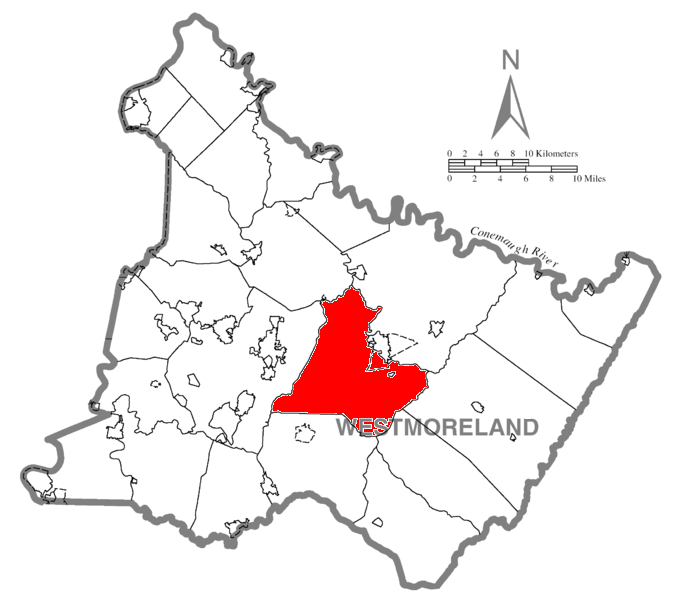
- Map of Westmoreland County, Pennsylvania Highlighting Unity Township

- Map of Pennsylvania highlighting Westmoreland County
- Country: United States
- State: Pennsylvania
- County: Westmoreland
- Settled: 1760
- Incorporated: September 23, 1789

Area
  - Total: 67.58 sq mi (175.02 km^{2})
  - Land: 67.44 sq mi (174.67 km^{2})
  - Water: 0.14 sq mi (0.35 km^{2})

Population (2020 United States census)
  - Total: 21,724
  - Estimate (2021): 21,599
- Time zone: UTC-5 (Eastern (EST))
  - Summer (DST): UTC-4 (EDT)
- Area code: 724
- FIPS code: 42-129-78656
- Website: Official website

Unity Township is a township in Westmoreland County, Pennsylvania, United States. The population was 21,724 at the 2020 census, a decline of approximately 4% compared to the 2010 census.

The township is home to Arnold Palmer Regional Airport. The Norfolk Southern Railway (once part of the Pennsylvania Railroad mainline) runs through the northern section of the township.

== History ==
Unity Township was incorporated on September 23, 1789. Initial records show settlement going back to 1760. Residents of Mount Pleasant Township petitioned the court to establish a new township around the area next to the Loyalhanna creek, based on the inconveniently large size of the existing township, which made it necessary to travel long distances to conduct township affairs. One of the oldest communities in the township was Youngstown, an important stop in the wagon and stagecoach era, ca. 1818–1852, which became a separate borough in 1831.

The township is home to Unity Cemetery, which was established in 1774. Some 15,000 people are believed to buried in the cemetery, including Colonel John Proctor, 31 other Revolutionary War veterans, U.S. Congressman William Findley and television host Fred Rogers.

In 1847 the Sisters of Mercy, an Irish Catholic order, established St. Xavier's Academy for Girls in Unity. In time, it expanded to include a convent. The buildings were destroyed by a fire in 1972, but the sisters' cemetery on the former school grounds in Unity remains.

For a time the coal industry "dwarfed all others" in the township, according to historian John Boucher, writing in 1906. Mines which once operated in Unity Township included those named Carney, Humphries, Dorothy, Marguerite, Mutual, Puritan (in Baggaley), Whitney, Jamison No. 20 (in Pleasant Unity), Hostetter, Beatty and St. Vincent's Shaft. Many of them were constructed in the period 1880 to 1900. All have long since closed. Extensive land remediation has taken place and few traces of the mines remain, but their names survive in township neighborhoods and streets.

Carr's Tunnel, an abandoned railroad tunnel, is located in Unity Township. Locally known as Witches' Tunnel, it is on a now-dismantled spur of the Pennsylvania Railroad which serviced coal mines in the area, including the Carney mine.

The Kingston House and St. Vincent Archabbey Gristmill are listed on the National Register of Historic Places.

== Geography ==
According to the United States Census Bureau, the township has a total area of 67.3 square miles (174.2 km^{2}), of which 67.1 square miles (173.8 km^{2}) is land and 0.2 square mile (0.4 km^{2}) (0.24%) is water.

The township contains the following communities: Baggaley, Beatty, Carney, Denison, Donohoe, Dorothy, Dry Ridge, George's Station, Greenwald, Hostetter, Humphreys, Lawson Heights, Lloydsville, Lycippus, Manito, Marguerite, Mutual, Old Crabtree, St. Vincent College, Pleasant Unity, and Whitney. To the west lies Hempfield Township; to the east, Latrobe Borough and Derry Township.

== Demographics ==
Historical population
Census	Pop.	Note	%±
1940	10,994		—
1950	12,392		12.7%
1960	15,519		25.2%
1970	18,419		18.7%
1980	19,976		8.5%
1990	20,109		0.7%
2000	21,137		5.1%
2010	22,607		7.0%
2020	21,724		−3.9%
2021 (est.)	21,599		−0.6%
U.S. Decennial Census

At the 2000 census there were 21,137 people, 7,963 households, and 5,773 families living in the township. The population density was 315.0 inhabitants per square mile (121.6/km^{2}). There were 8,372 housing units at an average density of 124.8 units per square mile (48.2 units/km^{2}). The racial makeup of the township was 98.12% White, 0.32% African American, 0.13% Native American, 0.86% Asian, 0.02% Pacific Islander, 0.15% from other races, and 0.40% from two or more races. Hispanic or Latino people of any race were 0.42%.

Of the 7,963 households 29.5% had children under the age of 18 living with them, 61.9% were married couples living together, 7.5% had a female householder with no husband present, and 27.5% were non-families. 24.6% of households were one person and 11.4% were one person aged 65 or older. The average household size was 2.48 and the average family size was 2.95.

The age distribution was 21.5% under the age of 18, 9.1% from 18 to 24, 26.4% from 25 to 44, 25.8% from 45 to 64, and 17.2% 65 or older. The median age was 41 years. For every 100 females, there were 96.7 males. For every 100 females age 18 and over, there were 93.6 males.

The median household income was $40,585 and the median family income was $49,593. Males had a median income of $37,907 versus $26,164 for females. The per capita income for the township was $21,116. About 5.8% of families and 8.7% of the population were below the poverty line, including 10.0% of those under age 18 and 9.8% of those age 65 or over.

== Transportation ==
Arnold Palmer Regional Airport is in the township.

== Education ==
The school district is Greater Latrobe School District. The district's comprehensive high school is Greater Latrobe Senior High School, located in the township.

Saint Vincent College is in the township boundaries.

== Notable people ==
- William Findley, U.S. Congressman, 1791–1797
- John Latta (1836–1913), 1st Lieutenant Governor of Pennsylvania

== Gallery ==
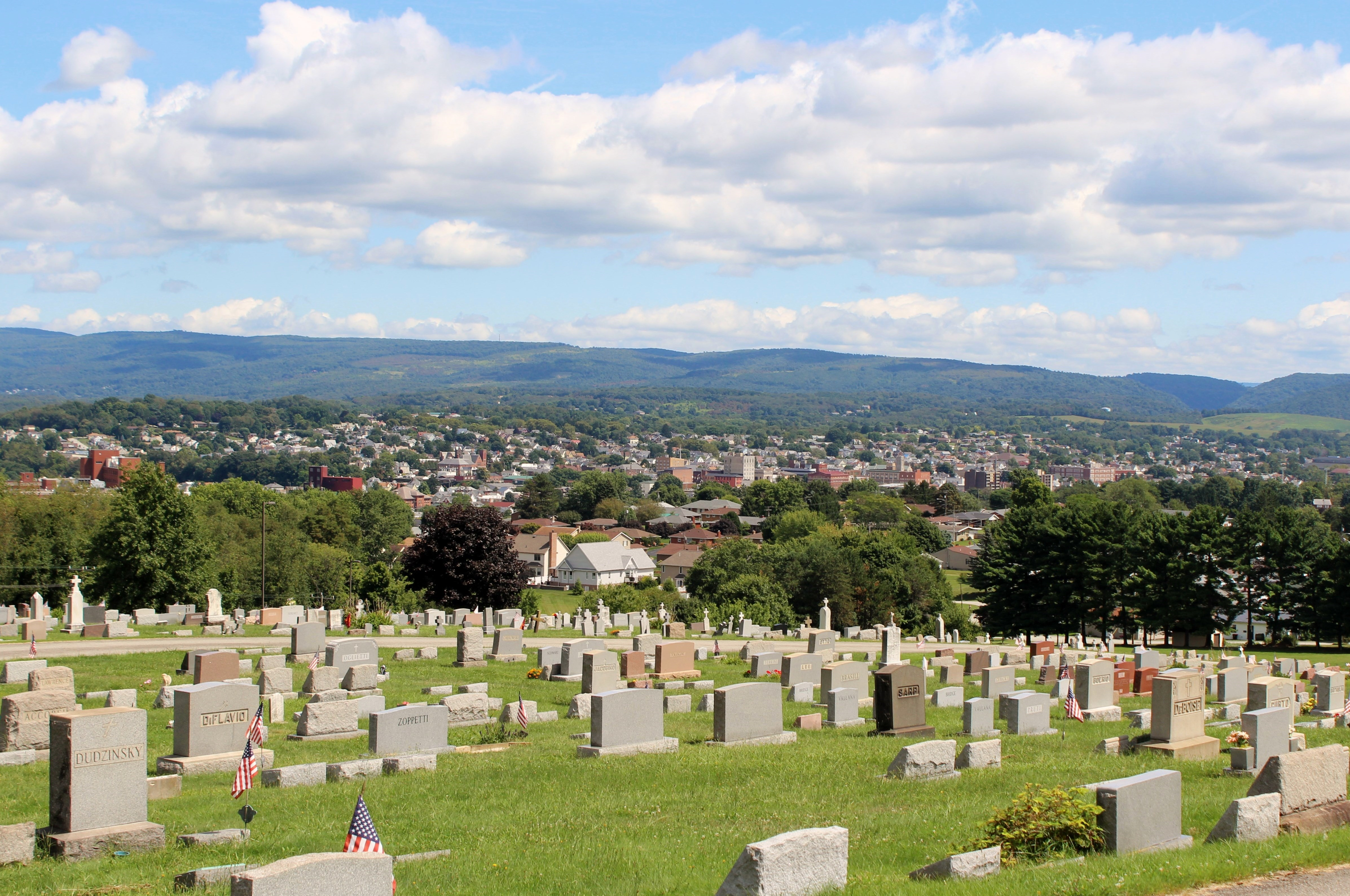
View from Unity Cemetery towards Chestnut Ridge

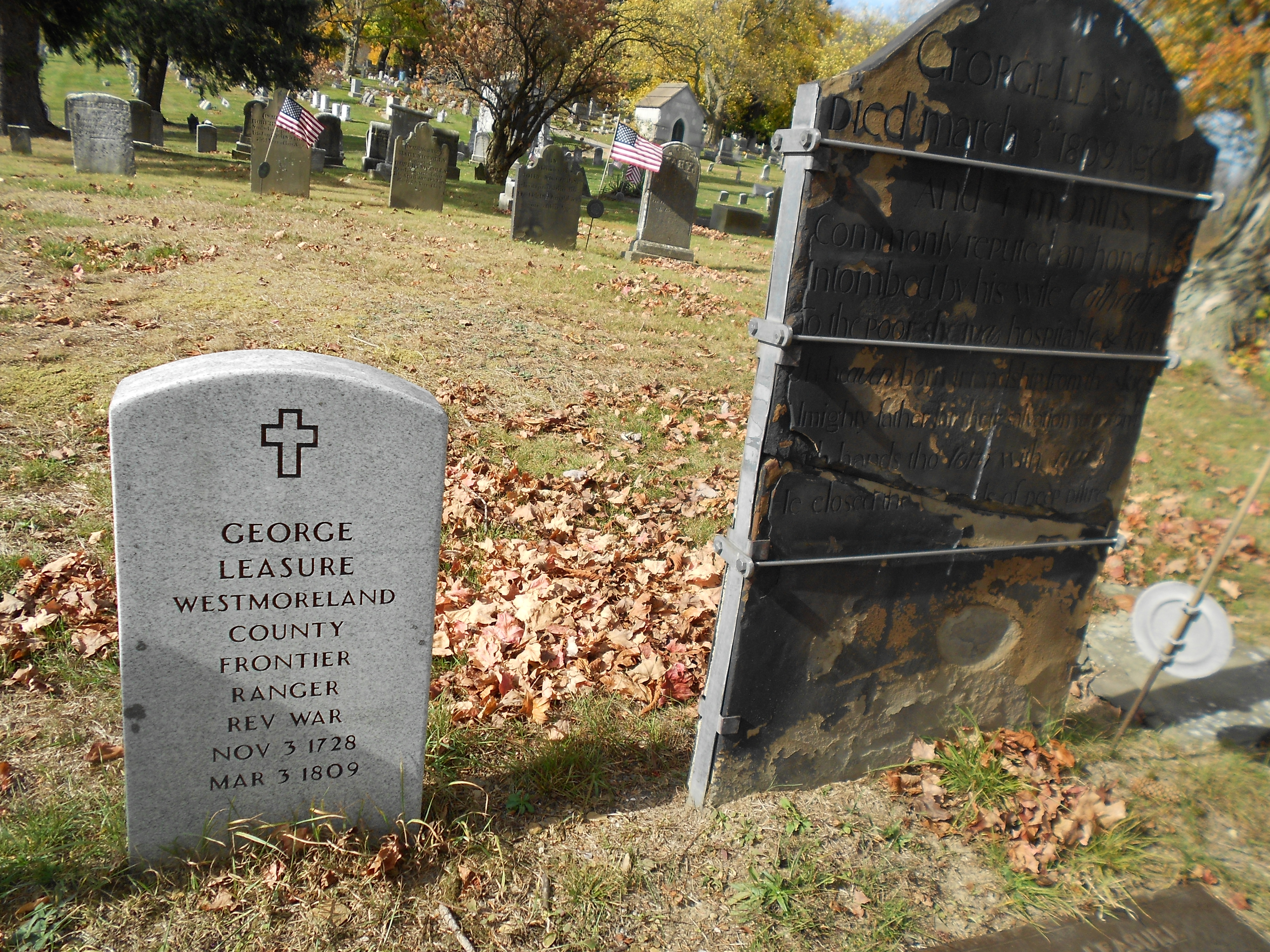
Historic graves in Unity Cemetery

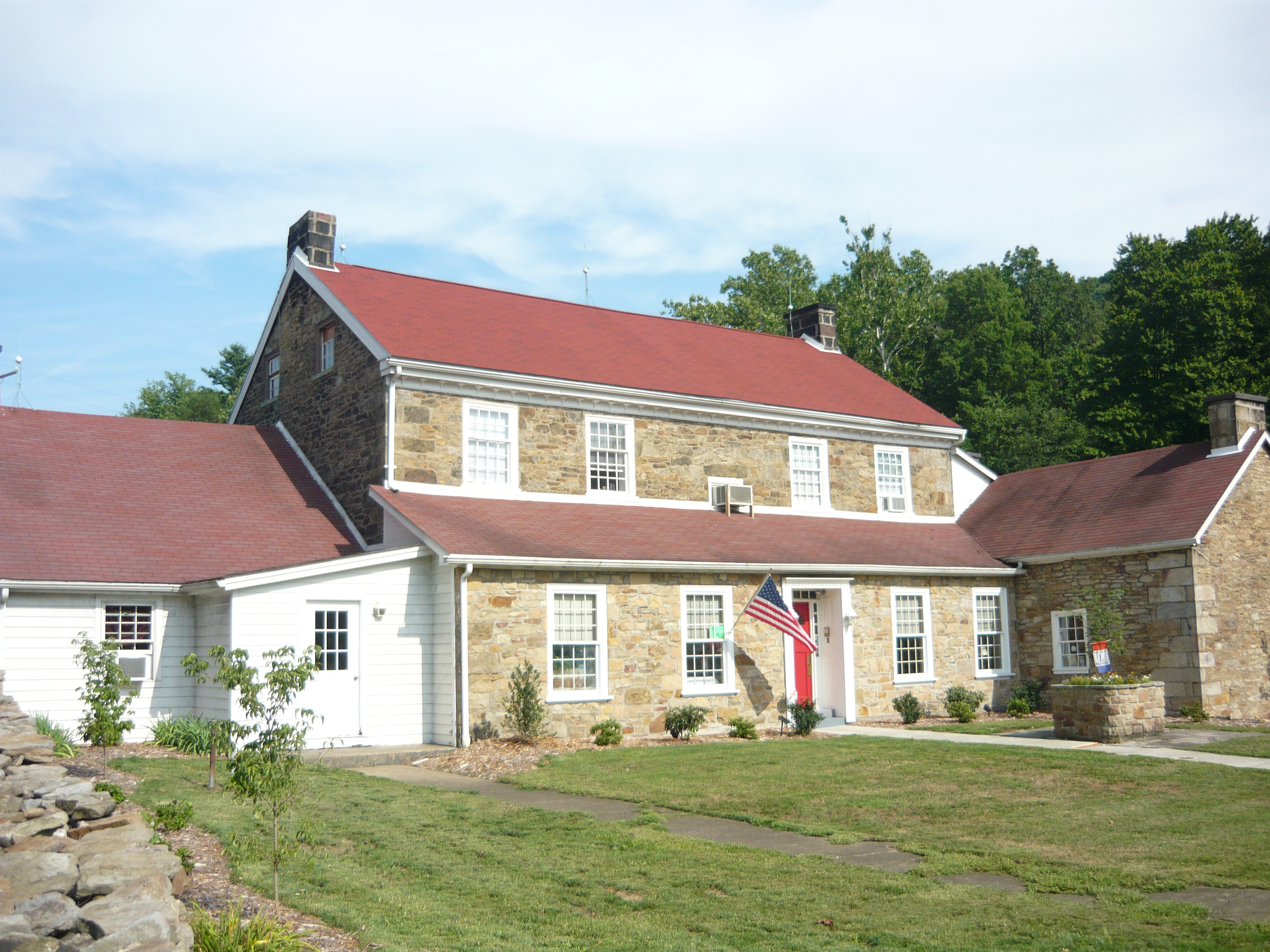
Kingston (Johnston) House, National Register of Historic Places

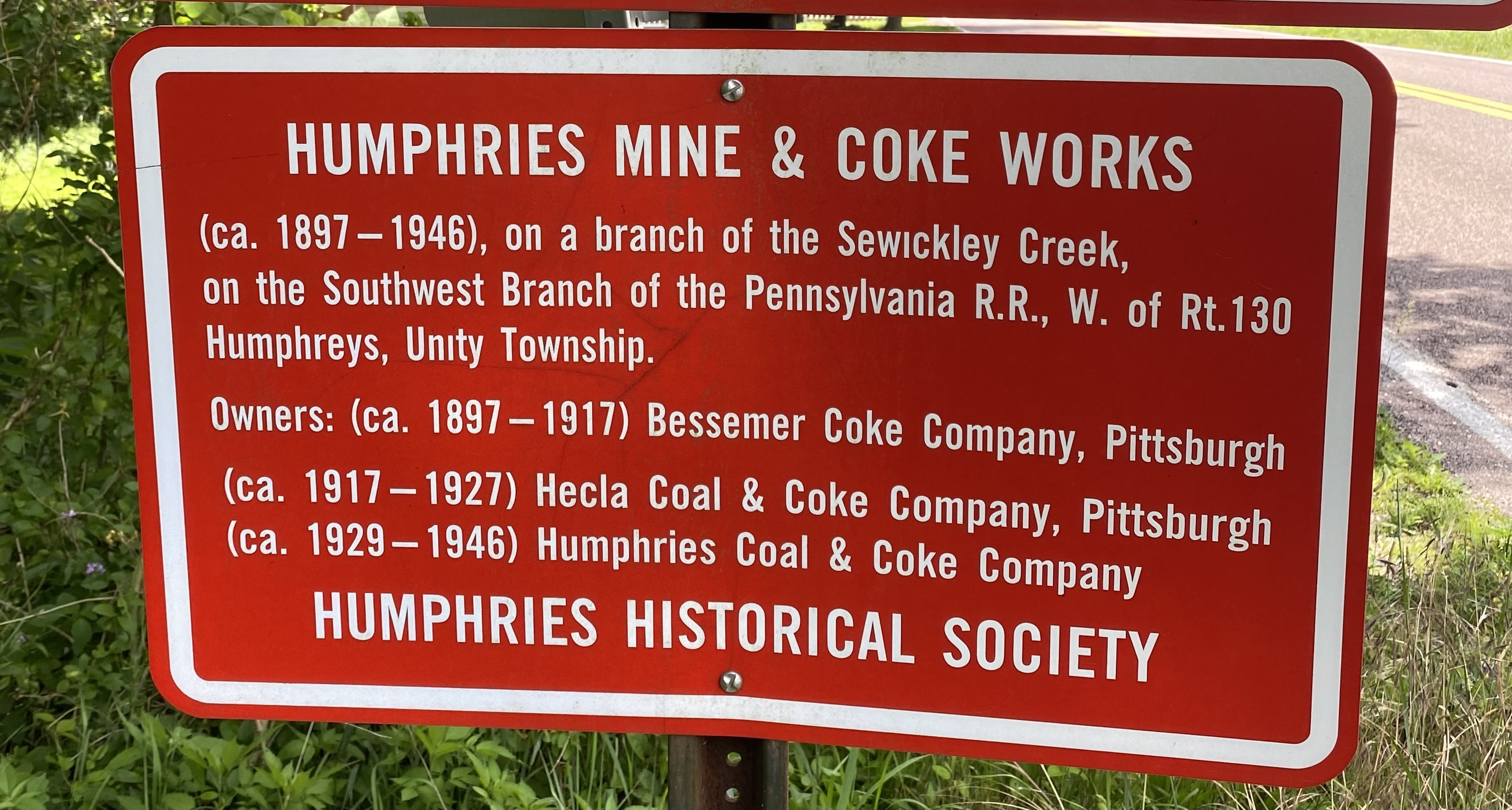
Remediated coal mine site

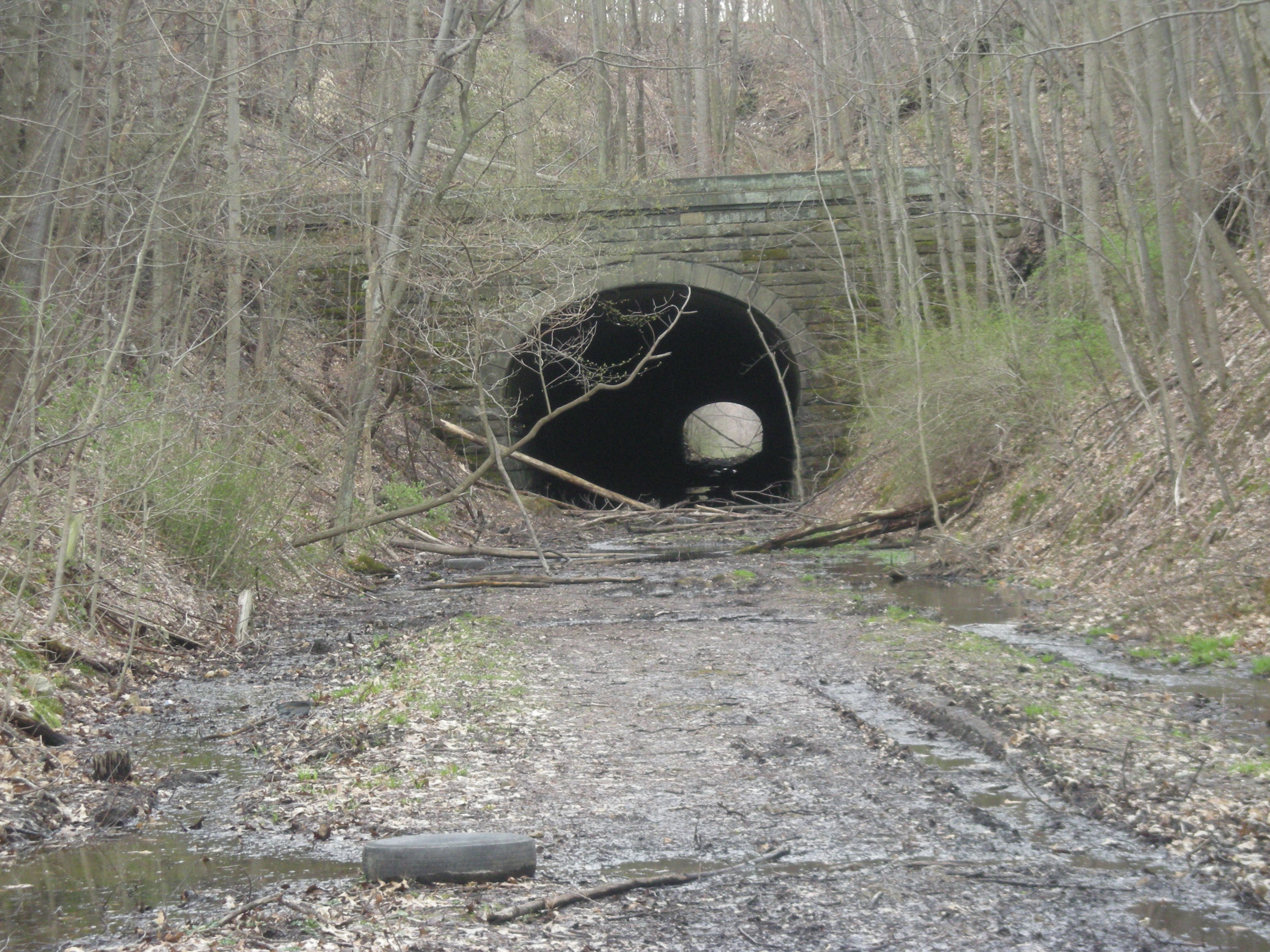
Carr's (Witches') Tunnel

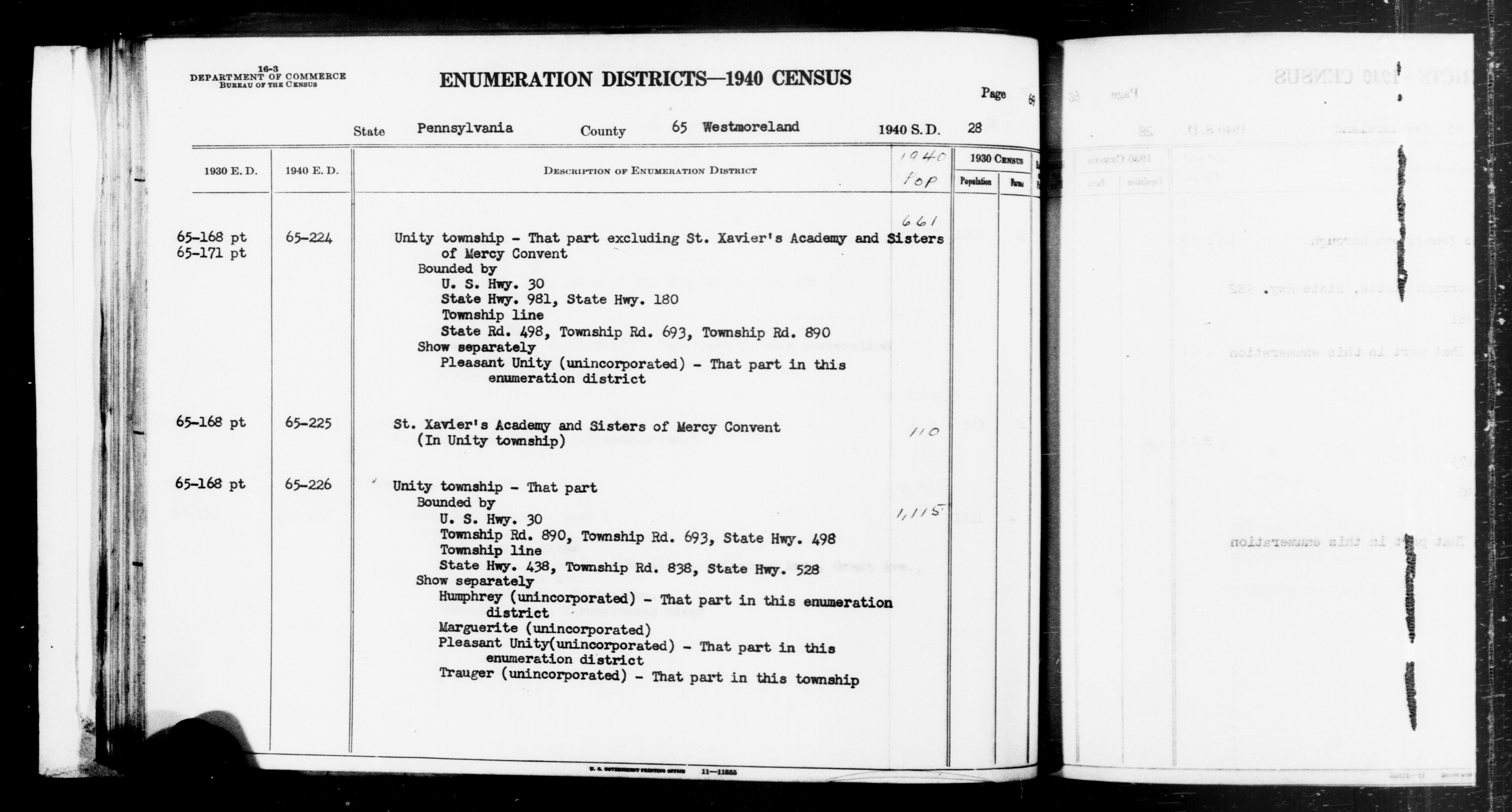
1940 Census description of township boundaries and St. Xavier's
