= Greater Latrobe School District =

School district in Pennsylvania

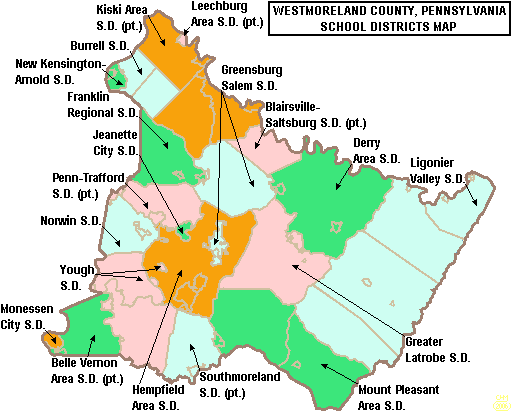

Address
- 410 Main Street Latrobe, Pennsylvania, 15650; United States

District information
- Type: Public
- Superintendent: Kim Rieffannacht

Students and staff
- District mascot: Wildcats
- Colors: Orange and black

Other information
- Website: www.glsd.us

Greater Latrobe School District is a midsized, suburban public school district in Westmoreland County, Pennsylvania. The city of Latrobe and the borough of Youngstown as well as Unity Township are within district boundaries. Greater Latrobe School District encompasses approximately 69 square miles (180 km^{2}). The community is a mix of Pittsburgh suburbia and rural areas.

According to 2005 local census data, it served a resident population of 29,134 people. In 2009, the district residents’ per capita income was $20,168, while the median family income was $47,069. In the Commonwealth of Pennsylvania, the median family income was $49,501 and the United States median family income was $49,445, in 2010.

The district operates three elementary schools, one junior high school, and one senior high school. Students at Greater Latrobe Senior High School have the opportunity to attend the Eastern Westmoreland Career and Technology Center in Derry Township.

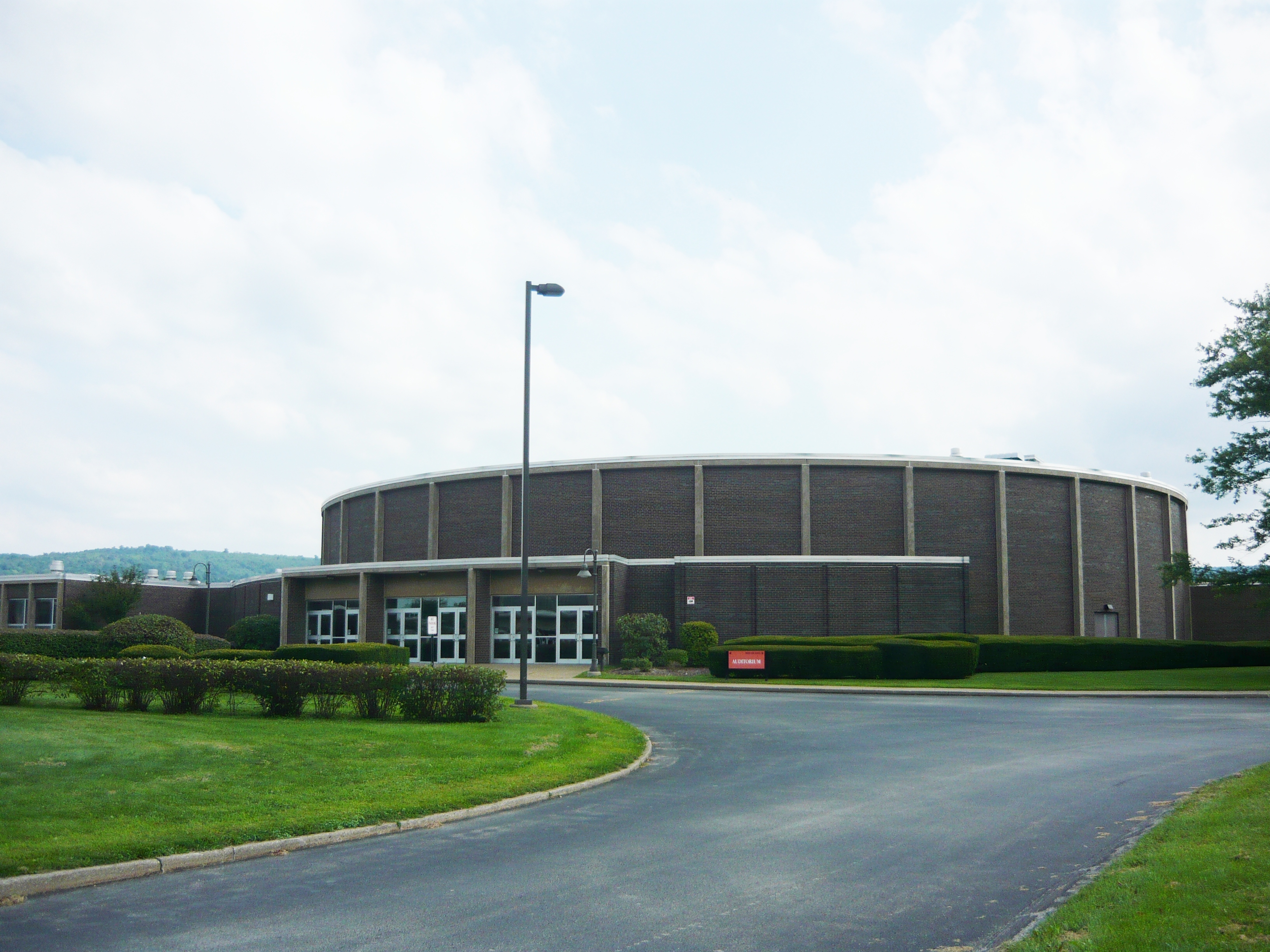
Senior High School Auditorium

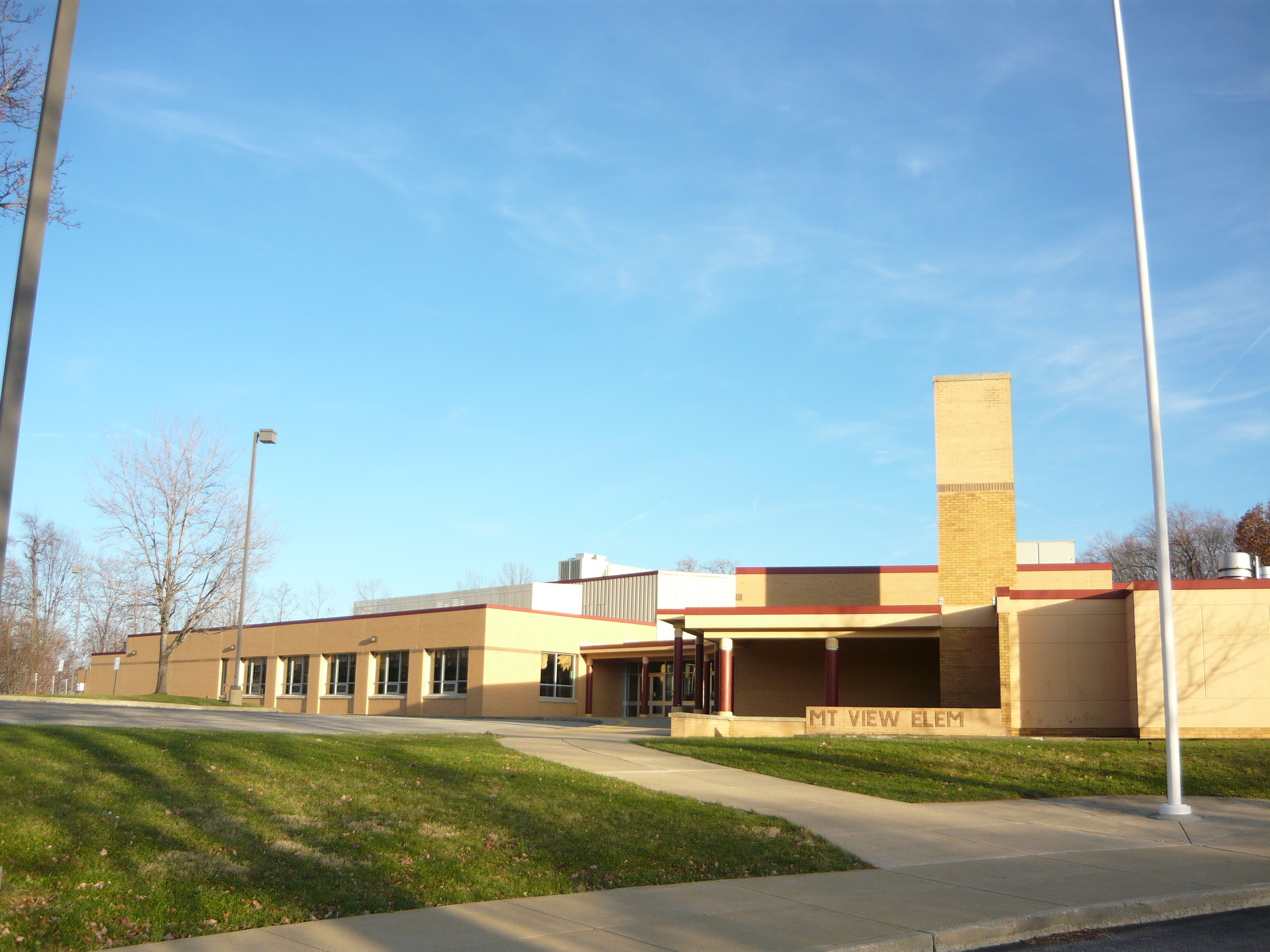
Mountain View Elementary School

== Extracurriculars ==
The district offers a variety of clubs, activities and sports.

=== Athletics ===
Sport	Boys	Girls
Baseball	Class AAAAA	
Basketball	Class AAAAA	Class AAAAA
Bowling	Class AAAA	Class AAAA
Cross Country	Class AAA	Class AAA
Field Hockey		Class AA
Football	Class AAAAA	
Golf	Class AAA	Class AAA
Ice Hockey	Class AA	
Lacrosse	Class AA	Class AAAA
Soccer	Class AAA	Class AAA
Softball		Class AAAA
Swimming and Diving	Class AAA	Class AAA
Tennis	Class AAA	Class AAA
Track and Field	Class AAA	Class AAA
Volleyball	Class AAA	Class AAAA
Wrestling	Class AAA	Class AAAA
