= Al-Aqsa Mosque (disambiguation) =

al-Aqsa Mosque may refer to:

- The Al-Aqsa mosque compound, also known as the Haram al-Sharif, an extended religious sanctuary in Jerusalem covering the entirety of the area of the Temple Mount.
- The Al-Aqsa Mosque building, the congregational prayer hall also known as the Qibli Mosque or Qibli Chapel located at the southern end of the wider Al-Aqsa compound.

== Other places ==
- Aqsa Mosque, Rabwah, a mosque in Rabwah, Pakistan
- Aqsa Mosque, Qadian, a mosque in Qadian, India
- Aqsa Mosque, The Hague, a mosque and former synagogue in The Hague, Netherlands
- Al-Qibli Mosque, one of the oldest mosques in Riyadh

== See also ==
- Al-Aqsa (disambiguation)
- Isra' and Mi'raj, mythical night journey of Muhammad from the Kaʿba in Mecca to al-Masjid al-Aqṣā in Jerusalem, from where he is believed to have ascended into heaven
