= Greater Latrobe Senior High School =

Location
- 131 High School Road; Latrobe, Pennsylvania 15650; United States; 40.2798°N 79.3762°W

Information
- Type: Public high school
- School district: Greater Latrobe School District
- Principal: Ted Benning
- Staff: 67.81 (FTE)
- Grades: 9-12
- Enrollment: 1,152 (2023-2024)
- Student to teacher ratio: 16.99
- Colors: Orange, black and white
- Athletics conference: WPIAL 5A Big East
- Team name: Wildcats
- Website: greaterlatrobeshs.glsd.us

Greater Latrobe Senior High School is a public high school in Unity Township, Pennsylvania, United States, with a Latrobe post office address. Greater Latrobe is the only senior high school in the Greater Latrobe School District which serves Unity Township, Latrobe, and Youngstown.

Brochure for opening ceremony

== Athletics ==
The following sports are offered at Greater Latrobe:

- Baseball
- Basketball
- Bowling
- Cross Country
- Field Hockey
- Football
- Golf
- Ice hockey
- Lacrosse
- Soccer
- Softball
- Swimming and Diving
- Tennis
- Track and field
- Volleyball
- Wrestling

=== State championships ===
- 1968 State Football Champions
- 2005 Girls Cross Country State Champions
- 2008 Ice Hockey State Champions
- 2009 Ice Hockey State Champions
- 2009 Boys Golf State Champions
- 2010 Ice Hockey State Champions
- 2013 Ice Hockey State Champions
- 2017 Baseball State Champions

== Notable alumni ==
- Fred Rogers — creator, showrunner and host of the preschool television series Mister Rogers' Neighborhood, which ran from 1968 to 2001.
- Lou Klimchock — 13-year veteran of Major League Baseball. Infielder for the Kansas City Athletics, Milwaukee Braves, Washington Senators, New York Mets, and Cleveland Indians.
- Arnold Palmer — Professional golfer, PGA champion.
- Kevin Guskiewicz — 22nd president of Michigan State University.
