= Lloydsville =

Lloydsville may refer to:

- Lloydsville, Ohio, an unincorporated community
- Lloydsville, Pennsylvania, an unincorporated community
