= AXA (disambiguation) =

Axa is a French insurance company.

It may also refer to:

== Places ==
- Anguilla, a British Overseas Territory in the Caribbean
- Clayton J. Lloyd International Airport (IATA airport code AXA), Anguilla
- Australia (ITU callsign prefix AXA), see Country codes: A
- Algona Municipal Airport (FAA airport code AXA), Kossuth County, Iowa, USA
- AXA Arena (disambiguation)

== People and characters ==
- Zaro Axa (died 1934), a Kurdish man who claimed to be 160 years old

== Other uses ==
- Alpha Chi Alpha (Ancient Greek: ΑΧΑ), a fraternity at Dartmouth College
- Alpha Chi Alpha (recognition) (Ancient Greek: ΑΧΑ), a defunct journalism society for women
- Axa (comics), a comic strip by Donne Avenell and Enrique Badía Romero, about Axa, a barbarian woman of the future
- AXA Cup, a professional men's tennis tournament
- AXA Bike Security, a Dutch brand of locks and bicycle lights, a subsidiary of Allegion

== See also ==
- Al-Aqsa (disambiguation)
- Aksa (disambiguation)
