= Jewish temple =

Jewish temple may refer to:

- Synagogue, a Jewish or Samaritan place of worship
- Temple in Jerusalem, the former Israelite or Jewish places of worship
  - Solomon's Temple, destroyed by the Neo-Babylonian Empire in 586 BCE
  - Second Temple, destroyed by the Roman Empire in 70 CE
  - Third Temple, prophesied in Judaism per the Hebrew Bible (the Old Testament in Christianity)
- Jewish Temple at Elephantine, used by Jews in Egypt until the 4th century BCE
- Jewish Temple at Leontopolis, used by Jews in Egypt between the 2nd century BCE and the 1st century CE
- House of Yahweh, referring to Israelite/Jewish places of worship in biblical and extrabiblical texts

== See also ==
- Solomon's Temple (disambiguation)
- Al Aqsa (disambiguation)
- Tel Motza Temple, used alongside Solomon's Temple in ancient Israel and Judah
- Samaritan Temple, established at Mount Gerizim (in today's West Bank) under the Achaemenid Persian Empire
- Tabernacle (disambiguation)
- Replicas of the Jewish Temple
- List of Jewish temples
