= Marguerite, Pennsylvania =

Unincorporated community in Pennsylvania, US

Marguerite
- Unincorporated community
- Location within the state of Pennsylvania Marguerite (the United States)
- Coordinates: 40°15′49″N 79°27′48″W
- Country: United States
- State: Pennsylvania
- County: Westmoreland
- Elevation: 1,060 ft (320 m)
- Time zone: UTC-5 (Eastern (EST))
  - Summer (DST): UTC-4 (EDT)
- GNIS feature ID: 1180403

Marguerite is an unincorporated community and coal town in Unity Township, Westmoreland County, Pennsylvania, United States. It was also known as Klondike.

According to a 1994 study by the U.S. Department of the Interior, Marguerite was established in 1897, when The Standard Connellsville Coke Company began developing a coal mine and coke works nearby and built houses for the employees. A second mine followed in 1900. The H.C. Frick Coke Company took over operations in 1903 and built more houses. At one point nearly 1,000 people reportedly lived in the area. Mining and coking ceased in Marguerite in the 1940s. The 1994 study found some traces of prior industrial activity, primarily disused coke ovens.

In December 2024 Marguerite was the site of an intensive search and rescue operation for Elizabeth Pollard, a Marguerite resident who was believed to have fallen into the abandoned mine through a sinkhole which formed near her home. Pollard's body was found on December 6, 2024, by a construction crew brought in to help find her. Pennsylvania State Police trooper Steve Limani told Pittsburgh television station WTAE-TV "Pollard was found around 30 feet from where the mine would have sat and 12 feet from where the original sinkhole occurred."
