= Aksa (disambiguation) =

Aksa may refer to:

== Places ==
- Aksa Beach, Aksa, Malad, Mumbai, India
- Aksa Avenue, Bangkok, Thailand

== Businesses ==
- Aksa (company), Turkish company manufacturing carbon fiber, natural white and solution dyed acrylic staple fiber, tow and tops for yarn spinning and non wovens
- Aksa Power Generation, Turkish company which manufactures electric generators, a subsidiary of Kazancı Holding
- Aksa Energy, a Turkish company, a subsidiary of Kazancı Holding
- Aksa, a brand used by Kazancı Holding

== Other uses ==
- Tuvan akşa, the currency of the Tuvan People's Republic (Tannu-Tuva) between 1934 and 1944

== See also ==
- Amine Aksas (born 1983), Algerian soccer player
- Al-Aqsa, religious complex for which Aksa is an alternative spelling
- Aksha (disambiguation)
- al-Aqsa (disambiguation), for which Aksa is an alternative spelling
- Axa (disambiguation)
