= Arnold Palmer Regional Airport =

Airport in Pennsylvania

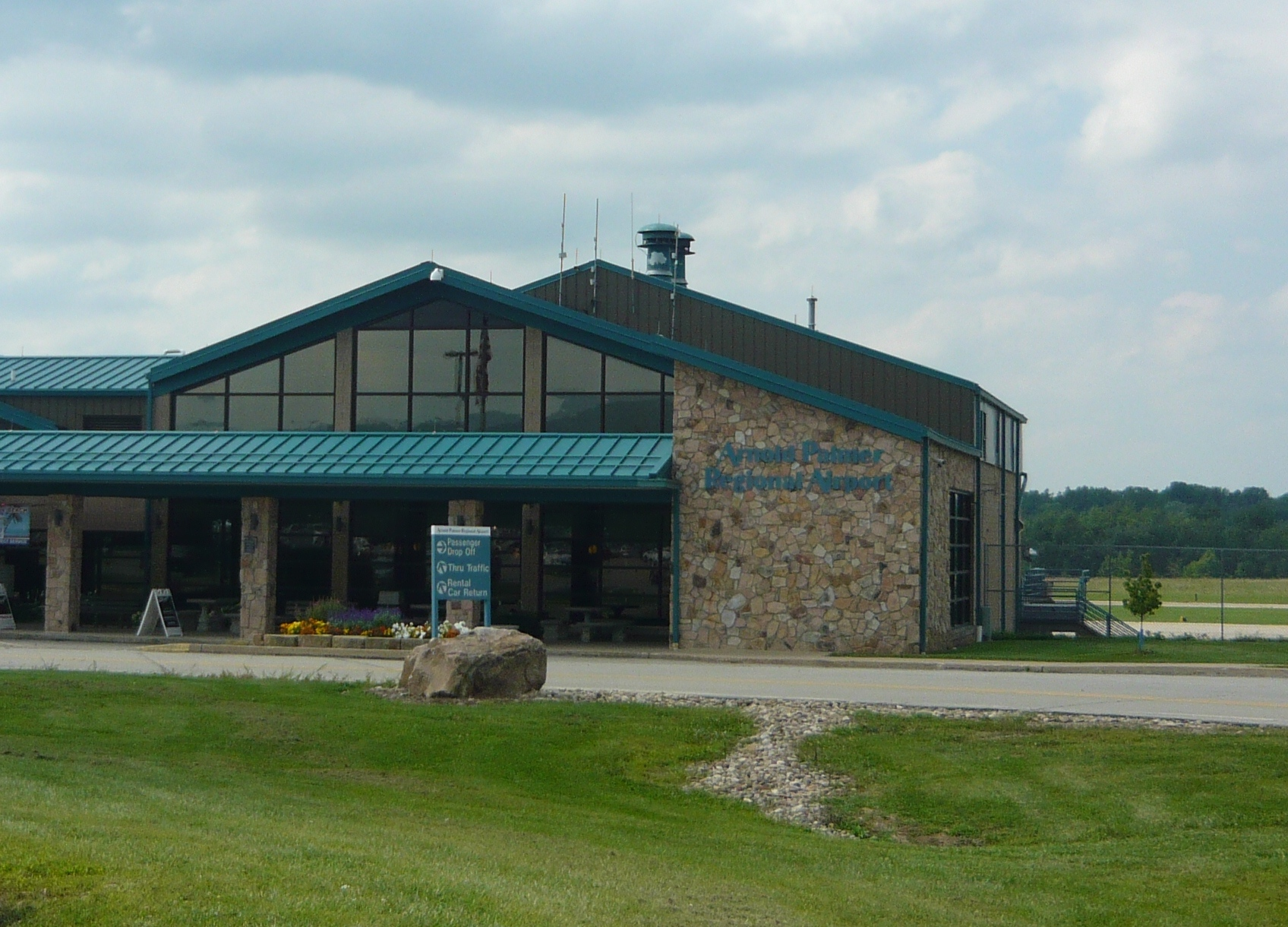
- IATA: LBE; ICAO: KLBE; FAA LID: LBE

Summary
- Airport type: Public
- Owner: Westmoreland County Airport Authority
- Serves: Latrobe, Pennsylvania
- Location: Unity Township, Pennsylvania
- Elevation AMSL: 1,199 ft (365 m)
- Coordinates: 40°16′29″N 079°24′24″W
- Website: PalmerAirport.com

Maps
- FAA airport diagram as of January 2021
- Interactive map of Arnold Palmer Regional Airport

Runways
| Direction | Length | | Surface |
| Direction | ft | m | Surface |
|---|---|---|---|
| 6/24 | 8,222 | 2,506 | Asphalt |

Statistics (12 months ending August 2024 ^{except where noted})
- Passenger volume: 154,000
- Scheduled flights: 563
- Aircraft operations (2021): 38,822
- Based aircraft (2021): 138
- Source: Federal Aviation Administration, BTS

Arnold Palmer Regional Airport (IATA: LBE, ICAO: KLBE, FAA LID: LBE) is in Unity Township, Westmoreland County, Pennsylvania, United States, two miles (3.2 km; 1.7 nmi) southwest of Latrobe and about 33 miles (53 km; 29 nmi) southeast of Pittsburgh. It was formerly Westmoreland County Airport; it was renamed in September 1999 for Arnold Palmer, who grew up nearby and learned to fly at the airport.

The Federal Aviation Administration (FAA) National Plan of Integrated Airport Systems for 2017–2021 categorized it as a non-hub primary commercial service facility.

Passenger traffic at the airport has significantly grown since Spirit Airlines began serving the airport in 2011, jumping from roughly 10,000 passengers in 2010 to 310,000 passengers in 2019, a 3000% increase. Spirit Airlines was the only commercial passenger carrier and flew to Orlando, Fort Lauderdale and seasonally to Myrtle Beach, until its closure on May 2, 2026.

== History ==
The airport was initially established as Longview Flying Field in 1924. It became J.D. Hill Airport in 1928, then Latrobe Airport in 1935.

On April 12, 1939, it became the site of the world’s first official airmail "Air Pick Up", where a Stinson Reliant aircraft successfully collected a mail container suspended between two poles without landing.

In 1978, the airport was renamed for the third time to Westmoreland County Airport after the county in which it resides.

In September 1999, to honor golf legend Arnold Palmer as part of his 70th birthday celebration, the airport took its current name. Palmer grew up within a mile of the runway where he was present for the 1939 airmail pickup as a child and where he subsequently learned to fly himself. The dedication ceremony included Governor Tom Ridge and a flyover of three A-10s of the Pennsylvania Air National Guard.

The airport was served by Northwest Airlink, as a reliever for Pittsburgh International Airport on the other side of the Pittsburgh metropolitan area. The airport had regional service by US Airways to Pittsburgh International Airport, until the company's bankruptcy. Northwest/Delta ended its service to Detroit on July 31, 2009.

Federal Aviation Administration records say the airport had 18,946 passenger boardings (enplanements) in calendar year 2008, 15,482 in 2009 and 6,978 in 2010.

In February 2011 Spirit Airlines launched seasonal service to Fort Lauderdale and Myrtle Beach; in January 2012 Spirit announced they would start service to Orlando on May 17. The airline formerly served the airport year-round. Spirit served two cities from Arnold Palmer Regional Airport, and increased passenger traffic from 6,978 in 2010 to 355,910 in 2015. Southern Airways Express has expressed interest in a Latrobe-to-Pittsburgh route but no start date has been announced.

In January 2020, airport officials announced a $13 million project using federal grant money to widen the main runway to accommodate any size plane.

On September 3, 2020, President Donald Trump held a rally at the airport as part of his reelection campaign for the 2020 United States presidential election.

On October 19, 2024, Donald Trump returned for a rally for the 2024 United States presidential election. The rally made national headlines because of Trump's suggestive comments about Arnold Palmer's genitalia.

In May 2026, Spirit Airlines suddenly ceased operations, ending the only passenger services at the airport. Spirit stated that the sharp rise in jet fuel prices linked to the 2026 Iran war made its low-cost business model unsustainable. Flights ended with little advance notice; operations were halted within a day of the announcement.

== Facilities ==
The airport covers 945 acres (382 ha) at an elevation of 1,199 feet (365 m). It has one active asphalt runway: 6/24 is 8,222 by 100 feet (2,506 x 30 m). Runway 3/21 is closed indefinitely; it was 3,609 by 75 feet (1,100 x 23 m). Runway 6/24 was formerly 5/23.

In the year ending December 31, 2021 the airport had 38,822 aircraft operations, average 106 per day: 80% general aviation, 13% air taxi, 5% airline, and 2% military. At that time, 138 aircraft were based at the airport: 91 single-engine, 11 multi-engine, 31 jet, and 5 helicopter.

The airport has a terminal building with one baggage claim. Car rental service is available at the airport. Westmoreland County Transit Authority buses make regular stops at the airport, where a park and ride lot is located. There are also shuttle buses to nearby hotels.

Fixed-base operators (FBOs) on the field include L.J. Aviation and Vee Neal Aviation. Its control tower is administered by FAA but staffed through MidWest ATC.

== Airlines and destinations ==
=== Passenger ===
| Airlines | Destinations |
|---|---|
| Breeze Airways | Myrtle Beach (begins February 9, 2027), Orlando (begins May 26, 2027) |

== Statistics ==
Busiest domestic routes from LBE (May 2025 – April 2026)
| Rank | Airport | Passengers | Carrier |
|---|---|---|---|
| 1 | Orlando, Florida | 36,410 | Spirit |
| 2 | Myrtle Beach, South Carolina | 20,090 | Spirit |
| 3 | Ft. Lauderdale, Florida | 5,110 | Spirit |

== See also ==
- List of airports in Pennsylvania
