= Al-Aqsa (disambiguation) =

Al-Aqsa mosque compound, also known as al-Masjid al-Aqṣā, is a religious site in Jerusalem located on the area of land known as both the Temple Mount and Haram al-Sharif by Jews and Muslims respectively.

Aqsa, Aksa, al-Aksa or al-Aqsa may also refer to:

== Organizations named for the compound ==
- al-Aqsa Foundation, international charity with alleged ties to the Palestinian militant organisation Hamas
- al-Aqsa Martyrs' Brigades, coalition of Palestinian nationalist militias in the West Bank
- al-Aqsa TV, the official Hamas-run television channel
- al-Aqsa University, Palestinian university established in 1991 in the Gaza Strip region of the Palestinian territories
- Jund al-Aqsa, a Salafist jihadist organization that was active during the Syrian Civil War

== Events named for the compound ==
- Al-Aqsa Intifada, the second Palestinian Intifada, named because of Ariel Sharon's visit to the Al Aqsa Compound (Temple Mount) in 2000
- Al Aqsa Massacre, a 1990 massacre which took place at the Al Aqsa Compound (Temple Mount)
- Operation Al-Aqsa Flood, the name for the Gazan operation as part of the October 2023 Gaza−Israel conflict

== Qur'anic reference ==
- al-Masjid al-Aqṣā, lit. 'The Furthest Mosque', a place mentioned in the 17th chapter of the Quran (al-Isra') for which the Jerusalem site is named, and from where Muhammad is believed to have undertaken his night journey known as Isra' and Mi'raj

== Other places ==
- Al-Aqsa Mosque (disambiguation)
- Al-Maghrib Al-Aqṣá (Arabic: المغرب الأقصى, "The Farthest West"), the ancient name of Morocco

== Other ==
- Aqsa Parvez (1991–2007), the victim of an honour killing in Mississauga, Ontario, Canada
- Tuvan akşa, the currency of the Tuvan People's Republic (Tannu-Tuva) between 1934 and 1944

== See also ==
- Aksa (disambiguation)
- Amine Aksas (born 1983), Algerian soccer player
- Temple Mountain (disambiguation)
- Solomon's Temple (disambiguation)
- Jewish temple (disambiguation)
- Axa (disambiguation)
