= Kingston House (Pennsylvania) =

Historic inn and tavern in Unity Township, Pennsylvania

- U.S. National Register of Historic Places
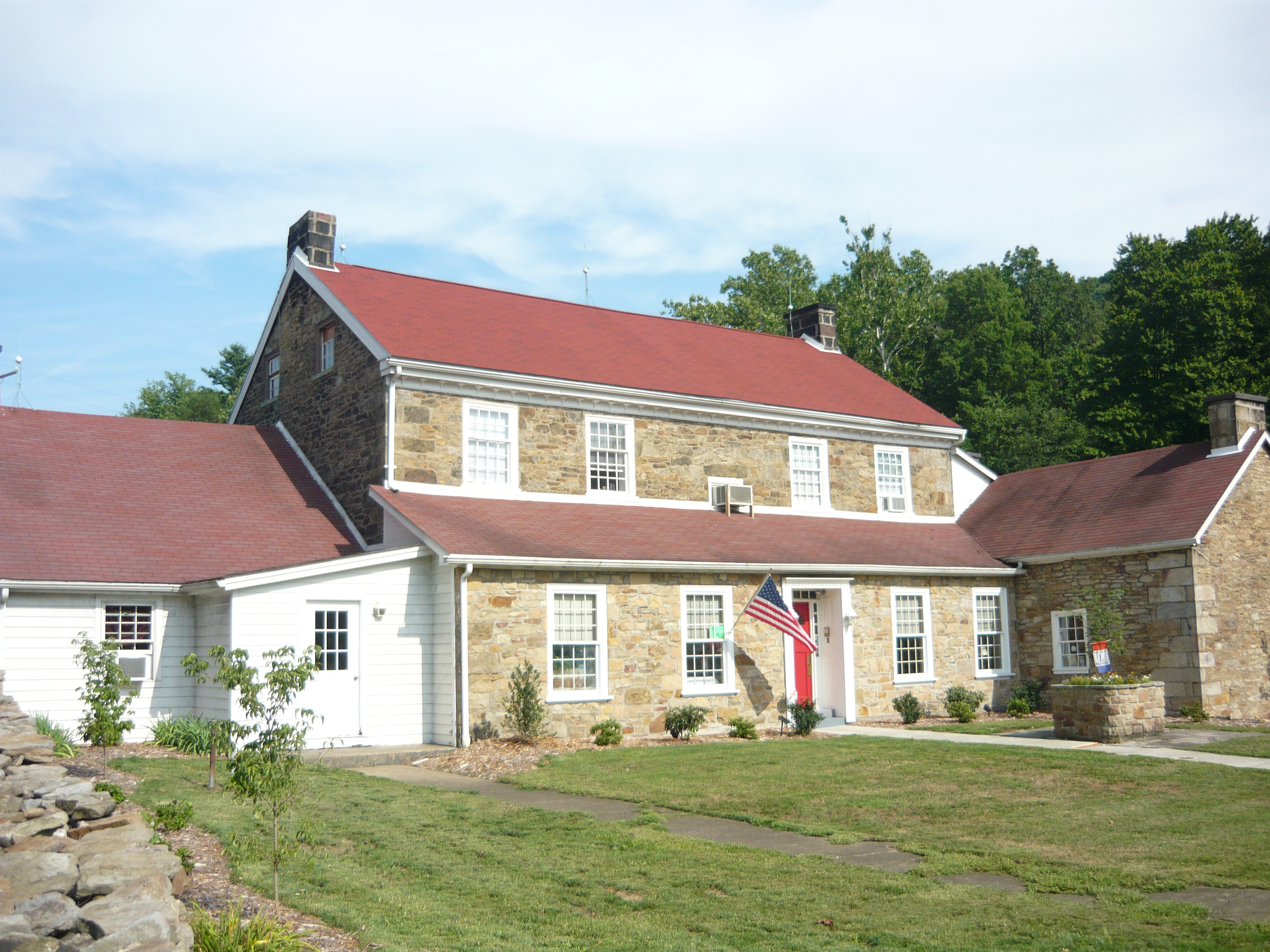
- Kingston House, July 2012

- Location within Pennsylvania Location within the United States
- Location: U.S. Route 30, northeast of Youngstown, Unity Township, Pennsylvania
- Coordinates: 40°17′28″N 79°20′29″W
- Area: 1.4 acres (0.57 ha)
- Built: c. 1815, 1830
- Built by: Johnson, Alexander
- Architectural style: Federal
- NRHP reference No.: 83002286
- Added to NRHP: June 30, 1983

The Kingston House, also known as the Alexander Johnston House, is an historic inn and tavern in Unity Township, Westmoreland County, Pennsylvania, United States.

It was added to the National Register of Historic Places in 1983.

== History and architectural features ==
Built circa 1815, this historic structure is a two-and-one-half-story, rubble stone building that is five bays wide. It has a center hall plan that was created in the Federal style. Attached to the house is a one-and-one-half-story, masonry wing that was erected in 1830. It was built by Alexander Johnston, who was an innkeeper who hosted a number of prominent guests, including presidential candidates William Henry Harrison and Zachary Taylor. Johnston's third son, William F. Johnston (1808–1872), served as Governor of Pennsylvania from 1848 to 1851.
