= AXA Arena (disambiguation) =

AXA Arena, now known as Stadion Letná, is a stadium in Prague, Czech Republic.

AXA Arena may also refer to:

- Winterthur Central Sports Hall in Winterthur, Switzerland
- Peugeot Arena in Bratislava, Slovakia

== See also ==
- Estádio AXA (Portuguese: AXA Stadium), Braga, Portugal
- Axa (disambiguation)
