= Murder of Christie Marceau =

2011 murder case in Hillcrest, Auckland, New Zealand

Christie Marceau
- Born: Christie Alexis Lesley Marceau; 16 April 1993
- Died: 7 November 2011 (aged 18); Hillcrest, Auckland, New Zealand
- Cause of death: Blood loss as a result of stabbing
- Education: ACG Parnell College
- Alma mater: AUT University

Akshay Chand
- Born: Akshay Anand Chand; 11 November 1992 or 11 December 1992 (age 33); Fiji
- Occupation: Unemployed (as of 7 November 2011)
- Criminal charge: Kidnapping (convicted); Not guilty of murder by reason of insanity
- Criminal penalty: 3 years imprisonment Committed to psychiatric care indefinitely
- Criminal status: In psychiatric care

On 7 November 2011, eighteen-year-old Christie Alexis Lesley Marceau (/ˈmɑːrsoʊ/, born 16 April 1993) was stabbed to death by eighteen-year-old Akshay Anand Chand (born 11 November or 11 December 1992) at her home in Hillcrest, Auckland, New Zealand. The murder came after Chand had kidnapped and assaulted Marceau in September 2011, and while awaiting trial on the charges, was bailed by the court to an address just 300 metres (1,000 ft) from Marceau's home, despite calls from Christie and the police to not grant bail. Chand was subsequently charged with Marceau's murder, but on 17 October 2012 was acquitted of her murder by reason of insanity. He was subsequently sentenced to three years imprisonment for kidnapping and was committed to a psychiatric hospital indefinitely.

Following the death, Christie's parents Brian and Tracey Marceau started a campaign in conjunction with the Sensible Sentencing Trust to change legislation to introduce more stringent bail laws and increase the accountability of judges.

== Kidnapping ==
Akshay Chand and Christie Marceau had first met each other while attending Willow Park Primary School in the North Shore suburb of Hillcrest where they both lived. After they both left Willow Park at the end of 2003, the two remained out of contact with each other until September 2010, when they met again while working at the same North Shore supermarket. In the following year, Chand and Marceau became friends, but the relationship was largely characterized by the naturally kind and generous Marceau providing emotional support for Chand. By the end of August 2011, Chand was no longer working at the supermarket and was unemployed.

On the morning of 6 September 2011, Marceau received a phone call from Chand, demanding that she come over to his house or he would kill himself. Concerned about Chand's well-being and fearing the worst, Marceau subsequently went to Chand's house nearby. Once she arrived, she was greeted by Chand and invited into the living room, while Chand locked the door behind her.

Sitting in the living room opposite Marceau, Chand began to talk about personal issues, before becoming agitated. At this point, he pulled a 20 cm long kitchen knife from his waistband and demanded Marceau's mobile phone. Forcefully taking her phone, he subsequently told her "If you don't obey me, I will knife you. If you scream, I will knife you. If you try to escape, I will knife you." He then demanded that she take her clothes off. After further threats of violence, Marceau complied and stripped down to her underwear.

Chand then confessed that he had intended to rape her, but had changed his mind and handed Marceau back her clothing and mobile phone, and allowed her to get dressed. As she was about to leave, Chand threatened that he would kill himself by swallowing crushed tablets (which were later revealed to be vitamin tablets), and while still terrified, Marceau attempted to dissuade Chand from attempting suicide. Marceau subsequently returned home, and after telling a family member, was taken to a local police station to report the incident.

== Initial charge and bail ==
Chand was arrested by Police later on 6 September. In a statement to the Police, he admitted detaining Marceau against her will, threatening her with a knife with the intention of raping her and threatening to stab her. He was subsequently charged by Police on three charges: kidnapping, threatening to cause grievous bodily harm and assault with intent to sexually violate. Chand first appeared in court the following day, and was remanded in custody. On 9 September, his application for bail was declined. Following the decision to decline bail, Chand wrote to the court, expressing deep remorse for what he had done and wanted to make amends.

On 5 October, a hearing on Chand's second application for bail was heard at the North Shore District Court before Judge David McNaughton. The Police filed their opposition, fearing tampering with witnesses (namely Marceau and her mother), and the mention during the police interview on 6 September that the attack was "revenge" against Marceau for not helping him. A letter from Marceau herself expressed concern for her own safety, noting that the house where Chand, his mother, and aunt lived and was to be bailed to was only 300 metres from her own home, and the fear that he could attack her again going about her daily routine.

Despite the opposition, Judge McNaughton allowed bail on strict conditions. Chand was bailed to his mother's house with a 24-hour curfew, with him not being allowed to leave the house except for medical or legal appointments, and only accompanied by a designated person.

== Murder ==
On the morning of 7 November 2011, Christie was at home with her mother and maternal grandmother. Her father at the time was in Australia with work. The Marceau house was a two-story property and sat on a hill sloping away from the road, with the front door on the upper level and the back door on the lower level.

At around 7 am, Christie was asleep downstairs and her mother was upstairs when the front doorbell rang. Christie was a frequent online shopper and it was not unusual for couriers to call in the early morning with deliveries. Thinking it was a courier, Christie's mother inadvertently opened the door to Chand, who was wielding a large kitchen knife. She backed away and screamed in warning to Christie, and when Chand asked who was home, her mother lied that Christie's father was home in another room.

Christie in reaction to her mother's scream had woken up and run up the stairs, only to be confronted by Chand. She was subsequently kicked in the chest by Chand, falling back down the stairs. Getting back up, Christie ran out the back door, across the rear deck to the back gate, and tried to unlatch the gate. Chand caught up to her, stabbing her in the left side of the face, causing Christie to collapse on the deck. She was stabbed an additional ten times by Chand before the knife blade bent 90 degrees and became useless.

Christie's mother had left her daughter and Chand to call 111. Her mother subsequently found Christie on the deck, still breathing, but Christie's injuries were too severe and she died in her mother's arms before emergency services could arrive. Chand remained at the scene until the police arrived. When asked by one officer what he was doing at the house, he replied "[for] reprisal", and when further asked why his hands were shaking, he replied, "It's not easy to kill someone, is it?" He then asked officers if it was all right to listen to his iPod. He was subsequently arrested for Christie's murder.

== Trial ==
In October 2012, Akshay Chand appeared at the Auckland High Court for the murder of Christie Marceau. The court heard how Chand's mental state had deteriorated leading up to the crime. At the time of the murder, he believed Christie Marceau had turned into the devil. He also believed that he had cervical cancer and that he could hear the voice of a girl named "Pauline" in his head.

During the trial, two different psychiatrists stated that Chand suffered from paranoid schizophrenia and may never recover, needing institutional care for the rest of his life.

At the conclusion of the trial, Chand was found not guilty of murder by reason of insanity. He was sentenced on 17 October 2012 to a psychiatric institution indefinitely.
