= Akhshay =

Akhshay اخشای
- Location in Afghanistan
- Coordinates: 34°57′28″N 67°36′30″E
- Country: Afghanistan
- Province: Bamyan
- Time zone: + 4.30

Akhshay (Persian: اخشای) is a village in Bamyan Province in northern-central Afghanistan.

== See also ==
- Bamyan Province
