= Youngstown Ridge =

Mountain in Pennsylvania, US

Coordinates: 40.280°N 79.370°W

Youngstown Ridge is a sparsely populated mountain, adjacent to Youngstown, Pennsylvania in Westmoreland County. It is the collective name for two neighboring ridges, Sugarbrush Ridge and Solomon's Temple Ridge.

For many years, Sugarbush Ridge had a small ski resort and restaurant, known as Sugarbush Ski Resort, though this facility has been shut down for many years. The trail that John Forbes forged through the Alleghenies crossed over Sugarbush Ridge following the same general path that the current Youngstown Ridge Road now follows. Local legend holds that a cache containing a Revolutionary War-era payroll was buried somewhere on the mountain and remains there to this day.

The origin of the name of Solomon's Temple Ridge is unclear. Local legend holds that an actual temple was built somewhere on the ridge long ago. Such a place is mentioned in History of the County of Westmoreland Pennsylvania, with Biographical Sketches with Many of its Pioneers and Prominent Men. 1882, Pg. 718...

but we have noticed that they are to be taken contrariwise when a churchly word is applied by a worldly people. There is, for instance, a one-story log church, with bench seats, standing on top of the Chestnut Ridge, which having been built on land donated by Mr. Solomon Blank, has been for half a generation known as "Solomon's Temple,"
