= List of Jewish temples =

The following is a list of temples associated with the Jewish religion throughout its history and development, including Yahwism. While in the modern day, Rabbinic Jews will refer to "The Temple", and state that temples other than the Jerusalem temple, especially outside Israel, are invalid, during the era in which Judaism had temples, multiple existed concurrently.

| Temples | Location | Establishment | Destruction/Decommission |
|---|---|---|---|
| Iron Age II temple in the City of David | City of David | 18th century BCE, perhaps by Melchizedek. | 8th century BCE, likely as a result of Hezekiah's reforms. |
| Solomon's Temple | Jerusalem | 10th–8th century BCE; according to HB: by Solomon. | 587 BC by the Babylonians. |
| Tel Motza temple | Tel Motza | 10th–9th century BCE. | Unclear, possibly existed into the 6th century BCE. |
| Tel Arad temple | Tel Arad | 10th–7th century BCE. | Probably destroyed during Hezekiah's reforms. |
| Bethel temple | Bethel | Sometime after 930 BCE. | Partially destroyed by Jehu (c. 842–815 BC), with its destruction completed by Josiah c. 640–609 BC. |
| Tel Dan temple | Dan | Sometime after 930 BCE. | Unclear. |
| Elephantine temple | Elephantine Island | Unclear. Already extant by 525 BCE. | Unclear. Letter requesting to rebuild after destruction in 410 BCE sent in 407 BCE. Permission was granted. |
| Second Temple | Jerusalem | Built by Zerubbabel, with dates given between 516 BCE and 350 BCE. Refurbished and significantly expanded by Herod the Great around 18 BCE. | 70 CE by the Romans. |
| Samaritan temple | Mount Gerizim | 450 BCE. | 110 BCE by the Maccabees. |
| Oniad temple | Leontopolis | Unclear, possibly as early as 168–167 BCE. | 73–74 CE by the Romans. |

== Also notable ==
- The old city of Beersheba had a horned altar, indicating it once likely had a temple.

== See also ==
- Replicas of the Jewish Temple
- Tabernacle
- Third Temple
