= Al-Qibli Mosque (Riyadh) =

Mosque in Manfuhah, Riyadh, Saudi Arabia

- مسجد القبلي
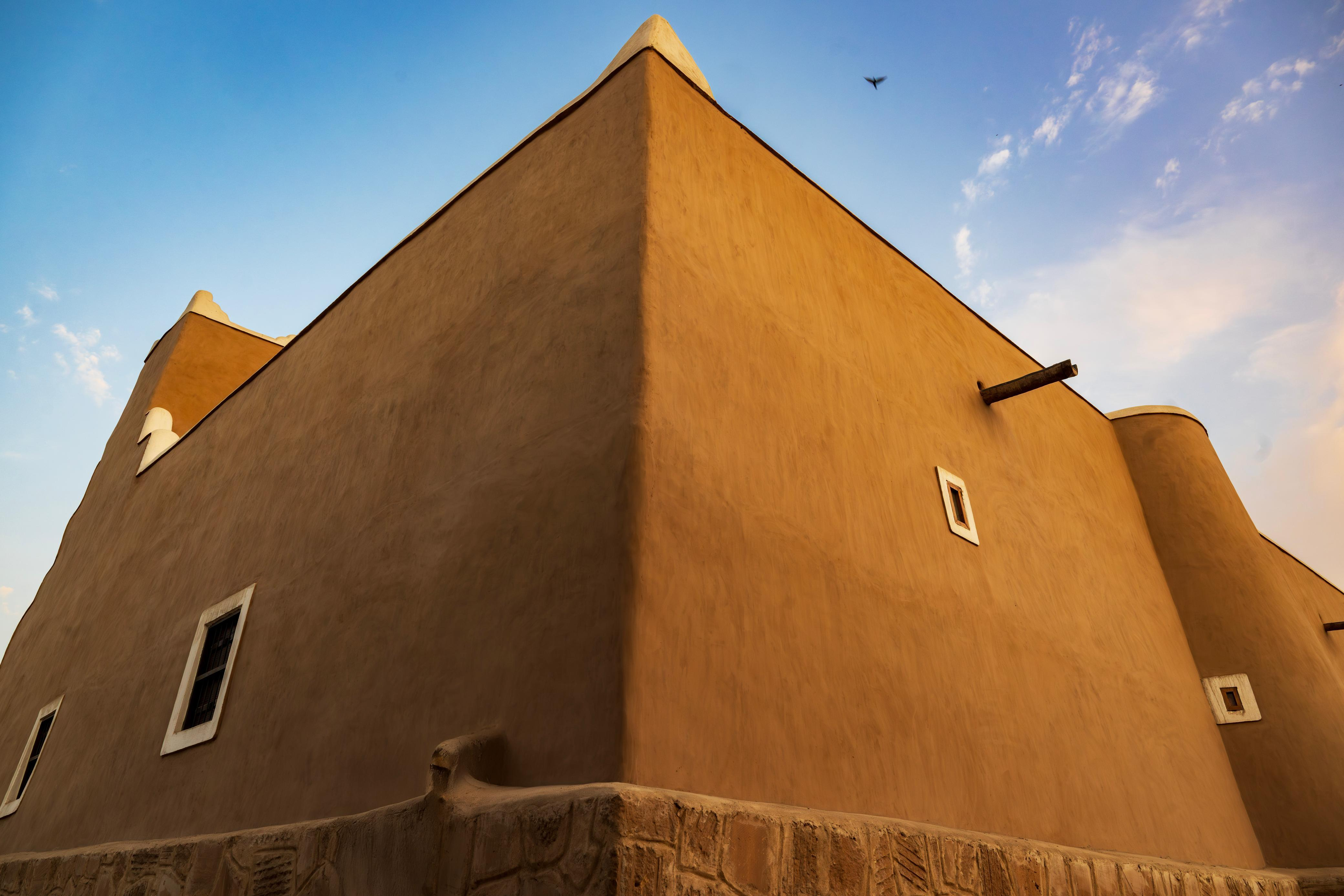
- Al Qibli Mosque, 2025

Religion
- Affiliation: Sunni Islam

Location
- Location: Riyadh, Saudi Arabia
- Interactive map of Al-Qibli Mosque
- Coordinates: 24°35′45″N 46°43′33″E

Architecture
- Style: Najdi architecture
- Established: c. 1689

Specifications
- Minaret: 1
- Minaret height: 6 m

Al-Qibli Mosque (Arabic: مسجد القبلي) is a historic mosque in the Manfuhah neighborhood of Riyadh, Saudi Arabia. The origins of the mosque have been traced as far back as 1689 and is one of the oldest mosques in Riyadh. The mosque was restored and rebuilt several times between 1945 and 1993, with the latest renovation having taken place in the period 2022–2024 during the second phase of Prince Mohammed bin Salman Project for the Development of Historical Mosques. Covering an area of almost 804 square meters, it can accommodate 440 worshippers and is built in traditional Najdi style.

== Overview ==
The mosque was built around 1689, when Dawwas ibn Abdullah, the father of Dahham ibn Dawwas, ruled the town of Manfuhah and was built in traditional Najdi architectural style, located in close proximity to the town's former ruling palace.

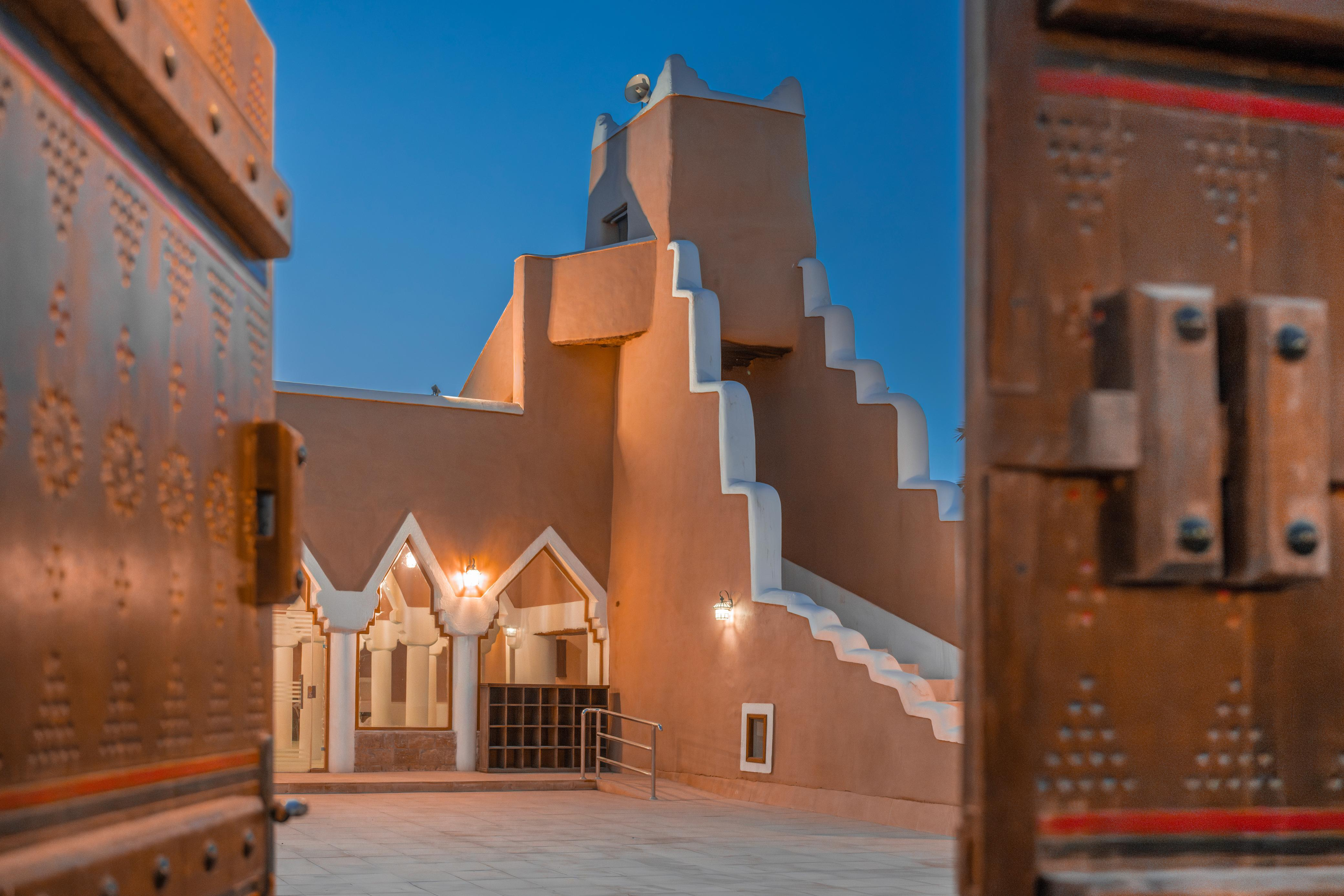
Entrance of the mosque after restoration and renovation.

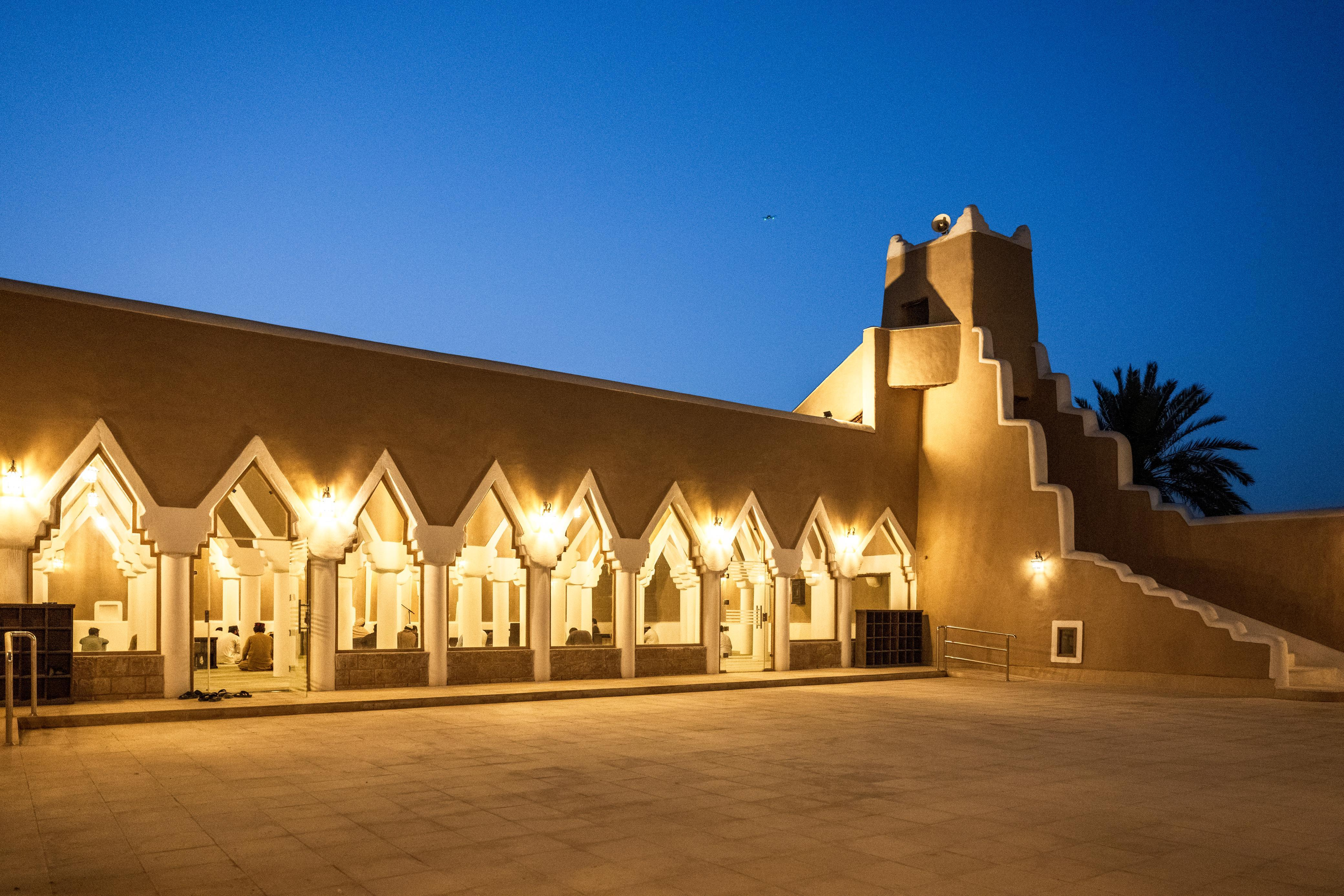

In 1945, the mosque was restored by King Abdulaziz ibn Saud, where the interior praying area was expanded from north to south by 120 square meters. The mosque has 33 colonnade. The mosque underwent minor restorations since then. In 1993, major renovation works were carried out by strengthening the foundations of the mosque. In 2022, the mosque was listed for restoration during the second phase of the Prince Mohammed bin Salman Project for the Development of Historical Mosques. The mosque covers an area of almost 804 square meters. It includes a rectangular minaret, whose height reaches 6 meters.

Prominent imams of the mosque have included Sheikh Saad bin Anbar, Sheikh Muhammad bin Hameed, Sheikh Abdulaziz al-Shuaibi, Sheikh Omar bin Khalifa, and Sheikh Omar bin Mahmoud, who died in 1966, in addition to Sheikh Abdulrahman bin Abdullah bin Mahmoud.

== See also ==
- Islam in Saudi Arabia
- List of mosques in Saudi Arabia
