= Lloydsville, Pennsylvania =

Unincorporated community in Pennsylvania, US

Lloydsville
- Unincorporated community
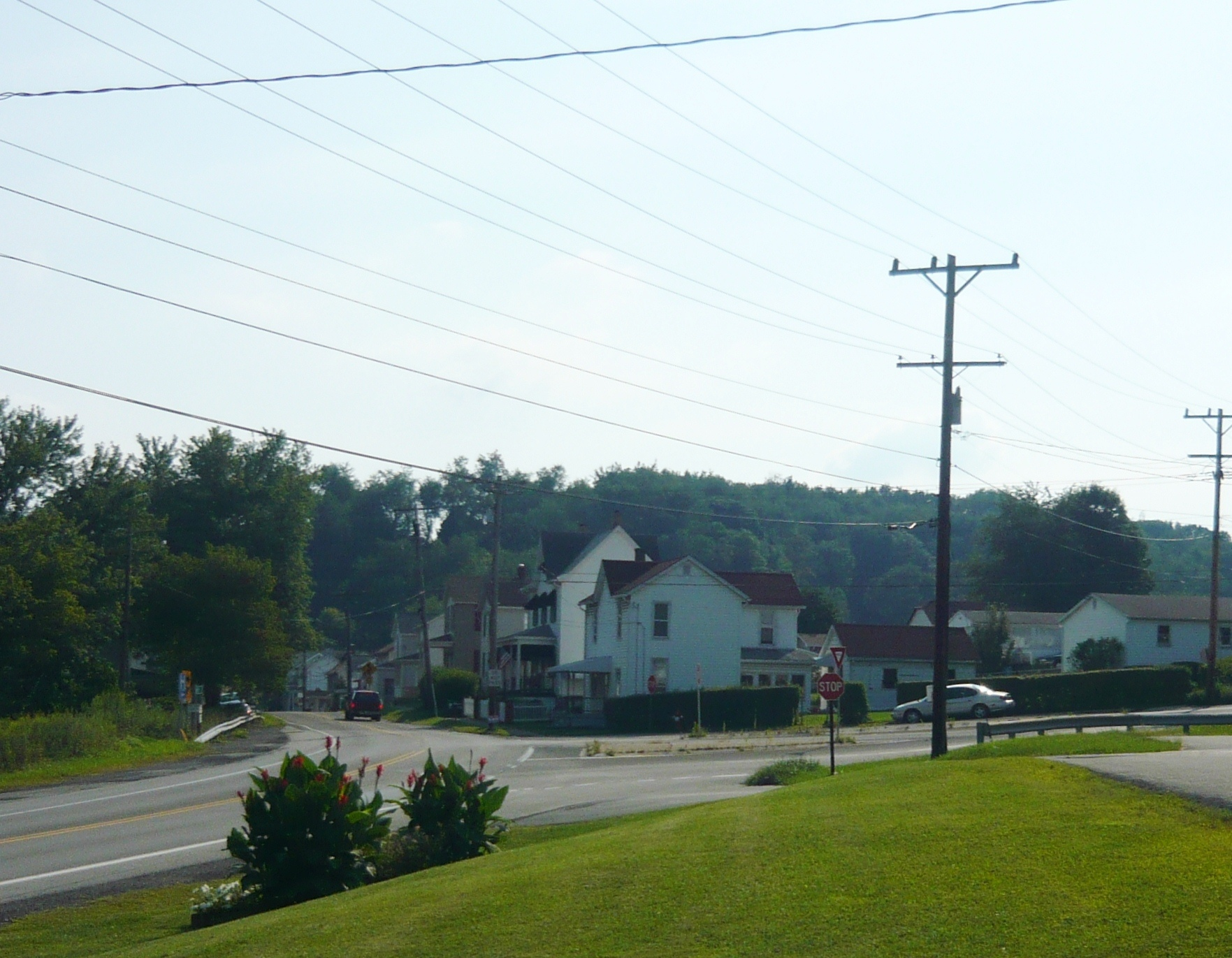
- Unity Street

- Location within the U.S. state of Pennsylvania Lloydsville (the United States)
- Coordinates: 40°18′38″N 79°24′03″W
- Country: United States
- State: Pennsylvania
- County: Westmoreland
- Elevation: 1,080 ft (330 m)
- Time zone: UTC-5 (Eastern (EST))
  - Summer (DST): UTC-4 (EDT)
- ZIP codes: 15650

Lloydsville is an unincorporated community in Unity Township, Westmoreland County, Pennsylvania, United States. Lloydsville is 1,080 feet (329 m) above sea level.

The U.S. Postal Service office for Lloydsville is located in Latrobe. The zip code is 15650.

Lloydsville has its own volunteer fire station, founded in 1931.

== History ==
Lloydsville, like much of Westmoreland County, was significantly influenced by the growth of the coal industry in the 19th century. The community was founded as part of the larger industrial movement in Pennsylvania, with several mines operating nearby. These coal mines played a vital role in the local economy, bringing workers and families to the area. As the mines closed in the mid-20th century, the area experienced a period of economic downturn, typical of many former mining communities in the region. However, Lloydsville retained a rural character, with many residents continuing to rely on agriculture and small businesses as the area’s main sources of income.

In the later 20th and early 21st centuries, the community began to shift toward residential development, though it has largely remained a quiet, suburban area. Lloydsville’s location within the Pittsburgh metropolitan area has made it an appealing spot for families looking for a quieter, rural setting while still being within commuting distance to the city’s job market and cultural amenities.

== Mine Subsidence ==
A notable ongoing issue for the community has been the problem of mine subsidence. With a history of coal mining in the region, many areas of Lloydsville are affected by the abandoned mines that lie beneath the surface. Mine subsidence occurs when the ground above these old tunnels begins to collapse, sometimes causing damage to buildings, roads, and infrastructure. This issue has led to concerns from residents and local authorities about public safety and the need for monitoring and mitigation efforts.

In some cases, the Pennsylvania Department of Environmental Protection (DEP) has been involved in addressing these issues by providing funding for mine reclamation projects and subsidence monitoring in areas affected by historical coal mining operations. Local authorities have also worked to raise awareness of the issue among residents, advising them on how to identify potential subsidence problems and steps they can take to minimize risks. While the problem is not unique to Lloydsville, it is a significant concern for many residents and a reminder of the lasting environmental and economic impacts of the coal industry in the region.
