= Aksha =

Aksha may refer to:

== Places ==
- Aksha, Sudan, site of a Temple of Ramesses II
- Aksha, Kazakhstan, a populated place in Kazakhstan
- Aksha, Russia, a rural locality (a selo) in Zabaykalsky Krai, Russia
- Aksha River, a river in Zabaykalsky Krai, Russia

== People and characters ==
- Akshayakumara, one of the sons of Ravana in the Hindu mythology
- Aksha Pardasany, an Indian actress

== Other uses ==
- Tuvan akşa, the currency of Tuva between 1934 and 1944

== See also ==
- Aksa (disambiguation)
