= Indian Akshay Urja Day =

Renewable energy awareness campaign

Akshay Urja diwas is an awareness campaign about the developments of renewable energy in India, celebrated on August 20 every year since 2004. Ministry of New and Renewable Energy initiated Akshay Urja Day (Diwas) in 2004. The first function was organised at New Delhi in 2004 and 2005 followed by Nagpur in 2006, Hyderabad in 2007 and Panchkula in 2008.

The day commemorates the birthday of former Indian prime minister Rajiv Gandhi. The day is also known as Rajiv Gandhi Akshay Urja Diwas.

The Ministry of New and Renewable Energy promotes innovation to adopt renewable energy sources to produce power for the electricity grid and for several standalone applications and decentralised power production. The energy such as Biogas, Solar Energy, Wind energy, hydroelectrical power are few example of Akshay Urja.

The main motive of Akshya urja Diwas is to make people aware that they have to think about the renewable energy (Akshya Urja) apart from traditional energy.

== Inaugural event ==
At the first Akshay Urja Diwas in 2004 a commemorative stamp was released by the Prime Minister. A human chain of nearly 12,000 school children was formed in the national capital to promote a renewable future.

== Supporting organizations ==
- Indian Biogas Association
