= Temple Mountain (Utah) =

Mountain in Utah, U.S.

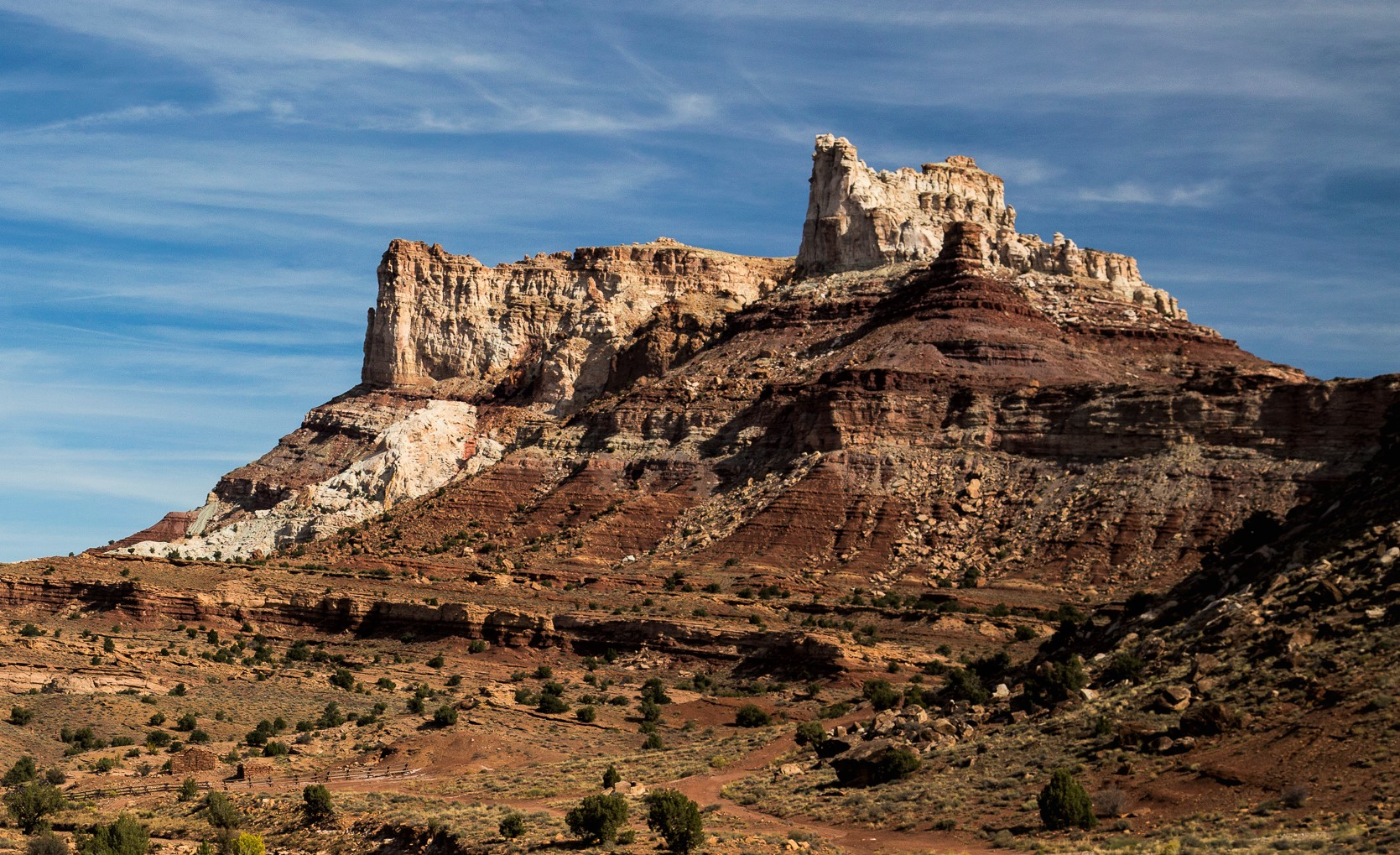
- Temple Mountain south aspect, October 2006

Highest point
- Elevation: 6,820 ft (2,080 m)
- Prominence: 840 ft (260 m)
- Parent peak: Block Mountain (7,425 ft)
- Isolation: 8.6 mi (13.8 km)
- Coordinates: 38°41′19″N 110°40′55″W

Geography
- Location within Utah Location within the United States
- Location: Emery County, Utah; United States
- Parent range: San Rafael Swell; Colorado Plateau
- Topo map: USGS Temple Mountain

Geology
- Rock age: Triassic to Jurassic
- Rock type: sedimentary

Climbing
- Easiest route: class 5.4 South-southeast Face

Temple Mountain is a remote 6,820-foot (2,080 m) mountain and abandoned town, located on the southeast flank of the San Rafael Swell in Emery County, Utah, United States.

== Description ==
The mountain was so named because the outline of this feature resembles the Salt Lake Temple in Salt Lake City. Towering 1,200 feet (370 m) above its surrounding terrain, it is the highest point along the San Rafael Reef, and prominently visible from long distances. It is situated approximately 45 miles (72 km) southwest of the town of Green River, 7.9 miles (12.7 km) north-northeast of Wild Horse Butte, and its nearest higher neighbor is Block Mountain, 8.6 miles (13.8 km) to the north-northwest. Precipitation runoff from this feature drains into Temple Wash which is part of the Green River drainage basin. Ownership is administered by the Bureau of Land Management.

== Geology ==
This mountain consists of bleached, almost white Wingate Sandstone, which is the remains of wind-borne sand dunes deposited approximately 200 million years ago in the Late Triassic, overlain and capped by Kayenta Formation, together forming the massive San Rafael Reef, which bounds the San Rafael Swell. Beneath these cliff-forming strata of the Glen Canyon Group are the lightly-colored slopes of the Chinle Formation which is composed of the Church Rock, Moss Back, Monitor Butte, and Temple Mountain Members. Uranium and other mined ore deposits are principally concentrated in the Moss Back Member. The oldest exposed rock is Early Triassic Moenkopi Formation at the base of the mountain.

== History ==
Mining claims were staked here as early as 1898, but no significant quantity of ore was produced until 1914 when mining for radium, vanadium, and uranium began and continued intermittently into the 1920s. The Temple Mountain mines were major uranium producers on the Colorado Plateau in the late 1940s and early 1950s. Madame Marie Curie had isolated radium from uranium ore, and she and her husband Pierre conducted research on radium and received the Nobel Prize for their studies in radioactivity. Ore from the Temple Mountain mines was shipped to France for Madame Curie's radium experiments. There are accounts that she visited Temple Mountain during one of her trips to the United States because she wanted to see where ore of such high quality originated. From 1948 through 1956, the Temple Mountain area produced approximately 1,287,000 pounds of Triuranium octoxide (U_{3}O_{8}), also known as yellowcake, and 3,799,000 pounds of Vanadium pentoxide (V_{2}O_{5}). During the uranium mining boom as a result of the escalation of the Cold War, a shanty town known as Temple City temporarily sprang up here.

== Climate ==
According to the Köppen climate classification system, Temple Mountain is located in a Cold semi-arid climate zone, which is defined by the coldest month having an average mean temperature below 32 °F (0 °C), and at least 50% of the total annual precipitation being received during the spring and summer. This desert climate receives less than 10 inches (250 millimeters) of annual rainfall, and snowfall is generally light during the winter. Spring and fall are the most favorable seasons to visit.

== Gallery ==
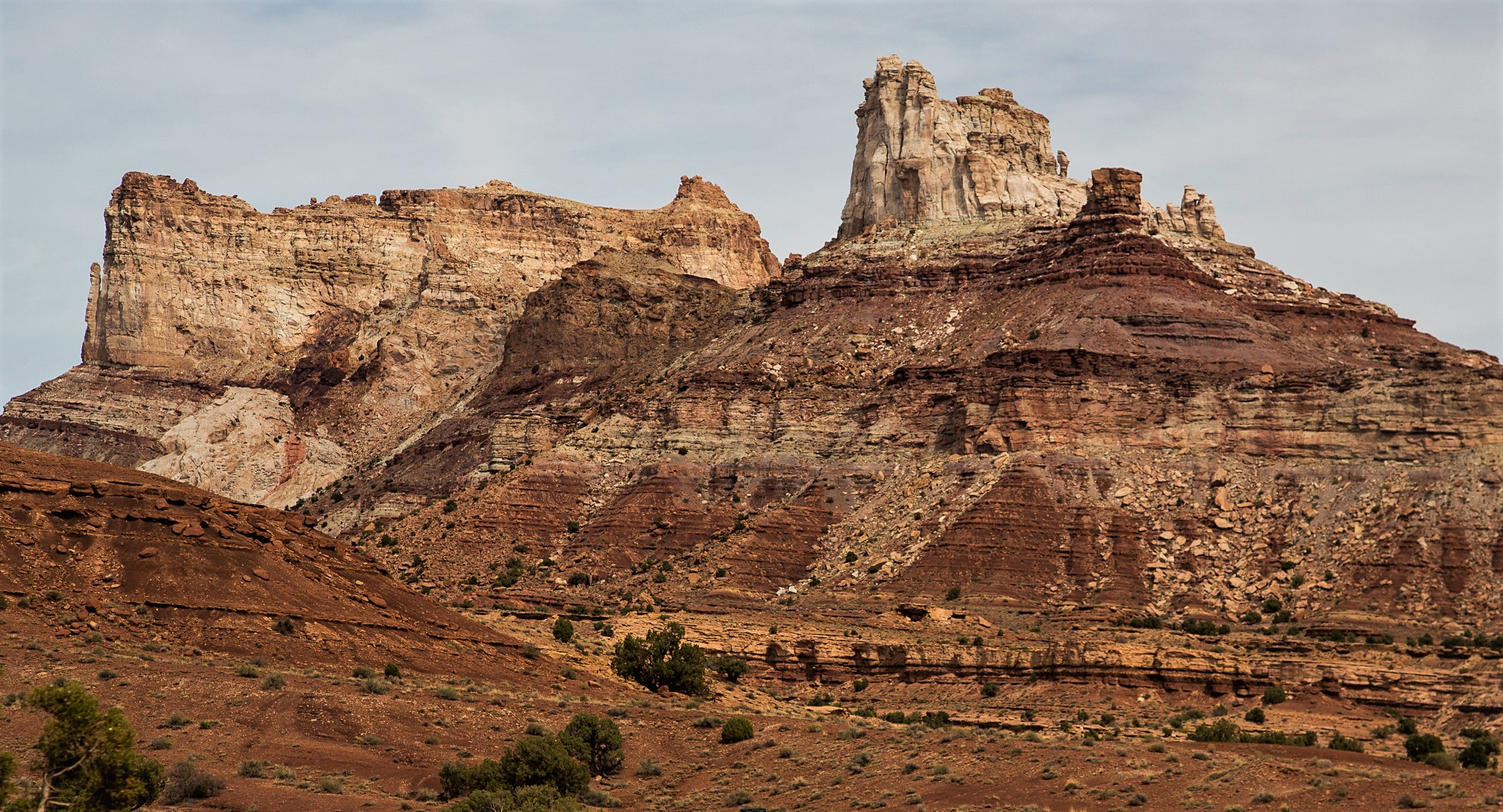
Temple Mountain, from the southwest, October 2016

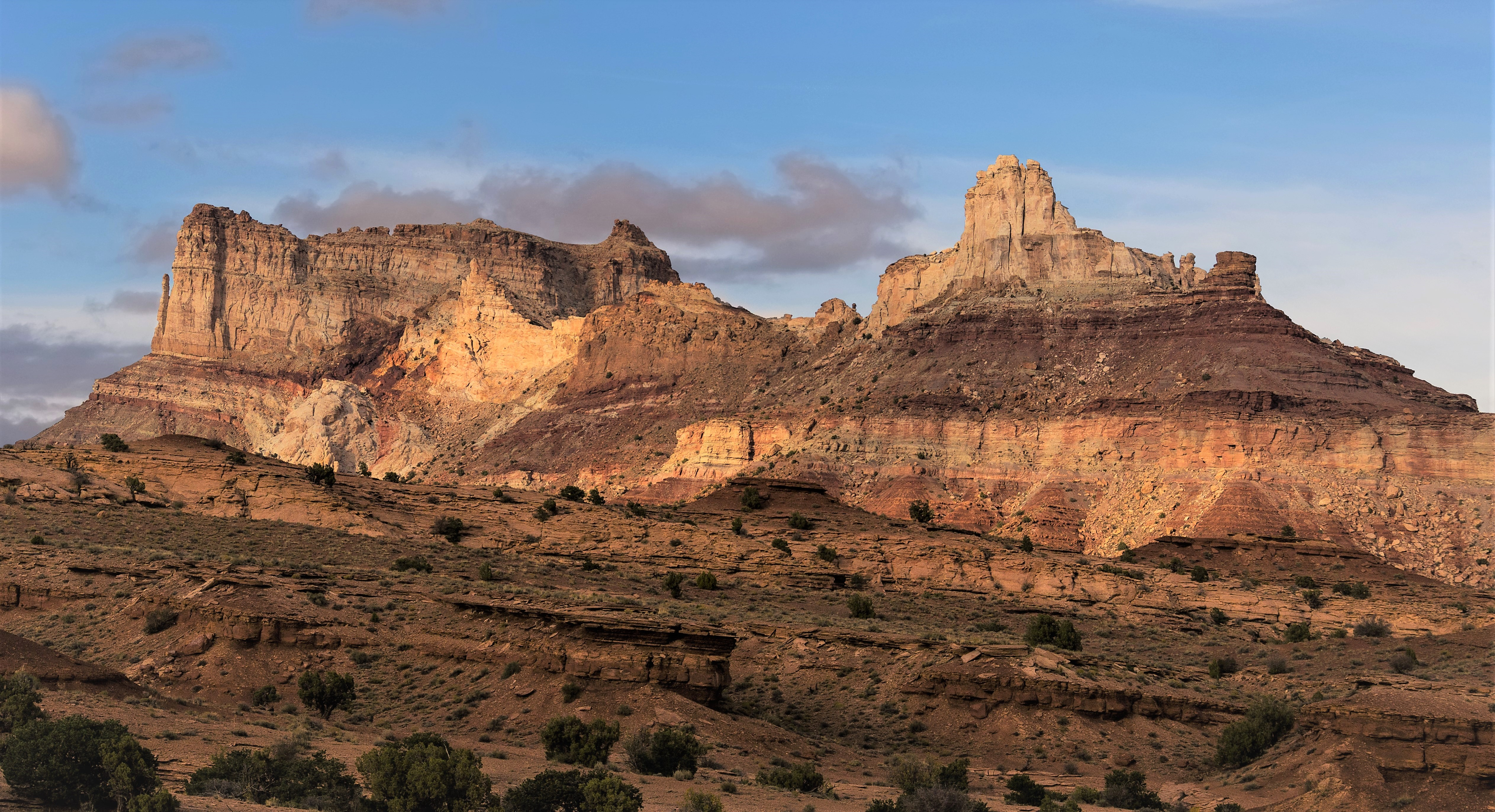
Temple Mountain, from the southwest, October 2015

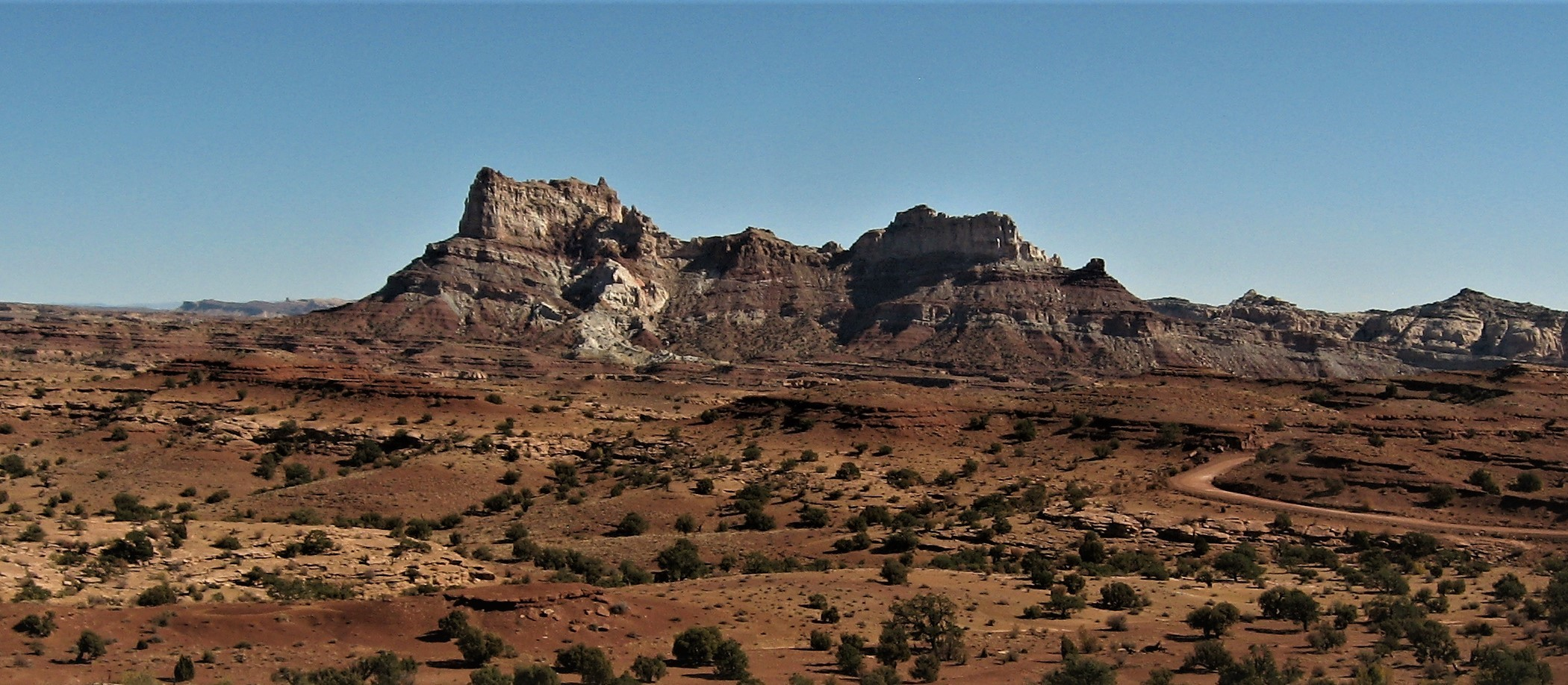
Temple Mountain, from the west, October 2009

== See also ==
- List of mountains of Utah
- Uranium mining in Utah
