= INS Akshay =

INS Akshay may refer to the following vessels of the Indian Navy:

- INS Akshay (P3136), an Ajay-class patrol vessel completed in 1962 and given to Bangladesh in 1973 where she served as BNS Padma
- INS Akshay (1990), an Abhay-class corvette commissioned in 1990
- INS Akshay (2024), launched in 2024
