= Youngstown, Pennsylvania =

Borough in Pennsylvania, US

- Borough
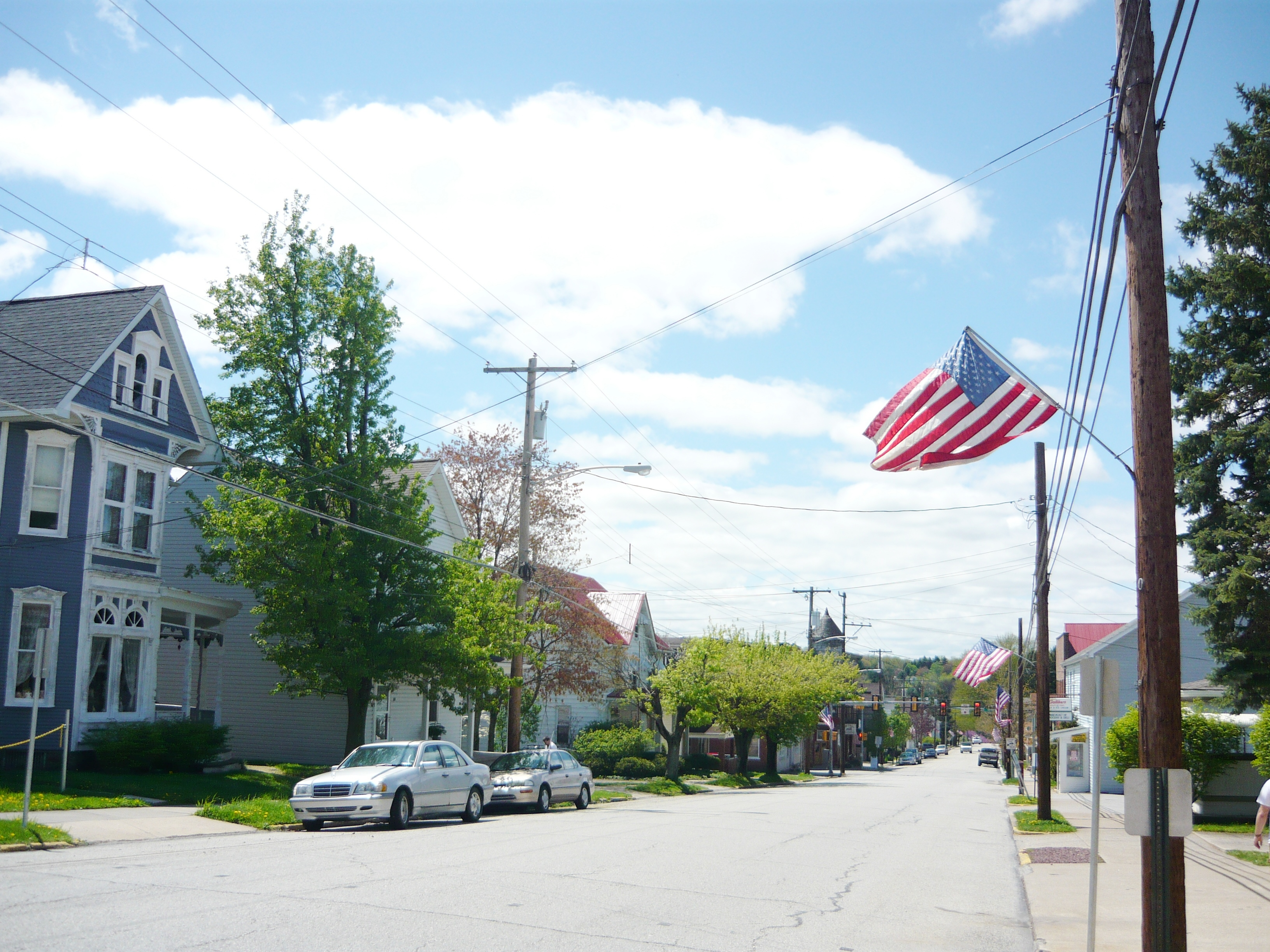
- Main Street

- Location of Youngstown in Westmoreland County, Pennsylvania.

- Location within Pennsylvania
- Coordinates: 40°16′51″N 79°21′56″W
- Country: United States
- State: Pennsylvania
- County: Westmoreland
- Settled: 1764
- Incorporated: April 2, 1831

Government
  - Type: Borough Council

Area
  - Total: 0.11 sq mi (0.29 km^{2})
  - Land: 0.11 sq mi (0.29 km^{2})
  - Water: 0 sq mi (0.00 km^{2})
- Elevation: 1,076 ft (328 m)

Population (2010)
  - Total: 326
  - Estimate (2019): 305
  - Density: 2,739.4/sq mi (1,057.67/km^{2})
- Time zone: UTC-5 (Eastern (EST))
  - Summer (DST): UTC-4 (EDT)
- Zip code: 15696
- Area code: 724
- FIPS code: 42-87208

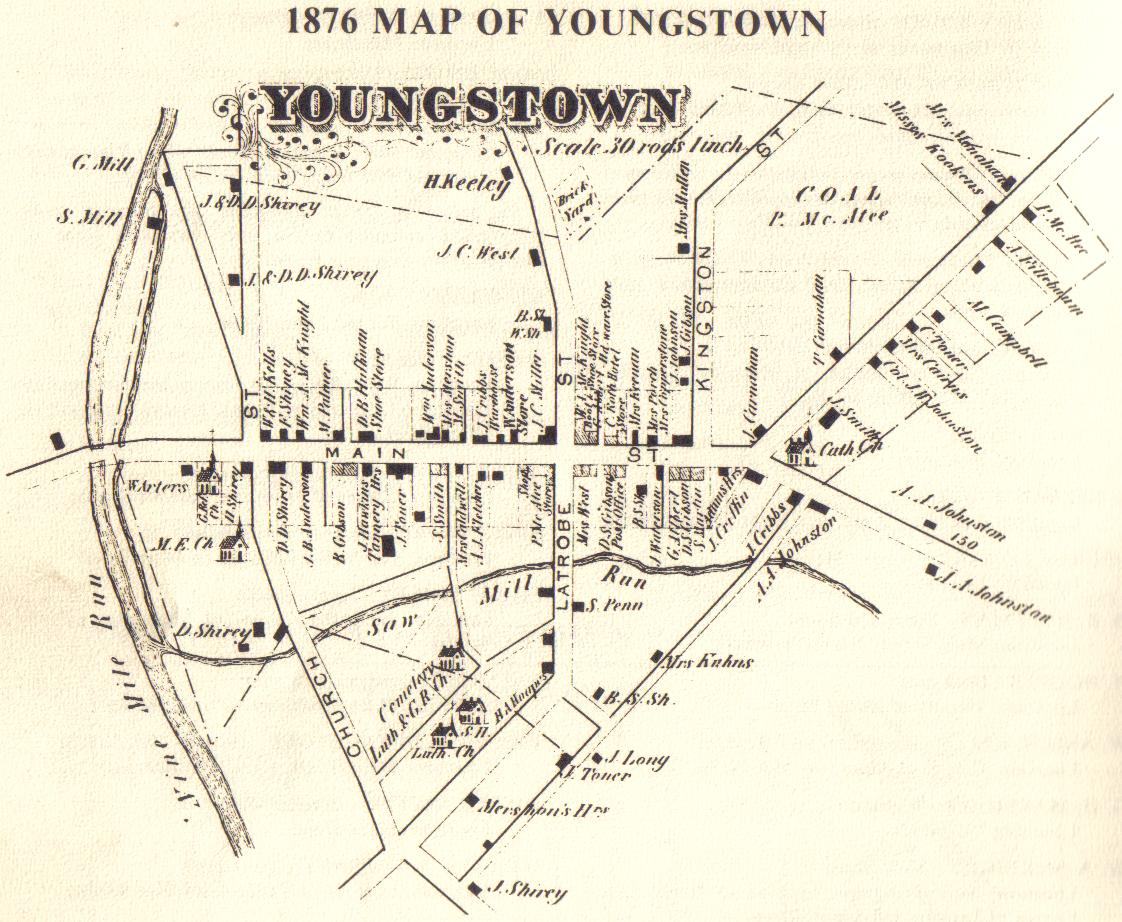
An 1876 map of Youngstown

Youngstown is a borough in Westmoreland County, Pennsylvania, United States. Youngstown was incorporated on April 2, 1831. As of the 2020 census, Youngstown had a population of 252. The borough has its own post office, with zip code 15696, established on April 1, 1813.

== History ==
The town was named after Alexander Young, whose first lot was recorded November 25, 1815, in the Recorder's office of Westmoreland County. There was a dispute to the name of the town over if it should be called Martinsburg or Youngstown. The name Youngstown was settled upon after it was found that a town of Martinsburg already existed in the Commonwealth. James Keenan's recorded plan of land on April 3, 1816, recorded the town as Youngstown Borough. As the community grew, and more people settled in the area, the citizens formed a political government. The residents petitioned the legislature in Harrisburg to form Youngstown Borough out of their lands. Governor George Wolf approved act No. 168 of 1830, on April 2, 1831. This act erected Youngstown, in the County of Westmoreland, into a Borough. Act No. 168 laid out the borough lines, and provided for elections of the burgess and other town officials, and stated the duties of the officials. As the town progressed, the residents felt themselves restricted by the Act of 1830 and petitioned Westmoreland County Court of Quarter Sessions to become subject to the Act of April 3, 1851. The Act of 1851 provided for more modern borough government than that permitted by the previous special act of legislature. The residents of the borough and their officers did not act quickly, since the petition to become subject to the Act of 1851 was not approved by Borough Council until July 25, 1905.

The opening of the Pennsylvania Government Land Office in the area in 1769, and the contract of the Pennsylvania Proprietaries with the Indians opened up the Loyalhannah Valley for settlement for pioneers, many of whom were of German and Scotch-Irish descent. Christopher Saxman in 1764, and Frederick Pershing in 1769 were the first recorded settlers in the area of present-day Youngstown. As a community and village grew, it was often called Martinsburg, after Martin West, another nearby land owner. Located along the Forbes road, a military road built under the command of Brigadier General John Forbes in 1758, the town became an important rest stop along the east–west route that eventually stretched from Philadelphia to Pittsburgh. In 1794, Federal troops passed through and quartered at the town's Barrett Hotel on the way to quell the Whiskey Insurrection.

Until 1796, Youngstown, often referred to as Martinsburg, had been randomly settled, with various people making claims to the land. The first recorded transaction of land came on March 31, 1796, when Robert Dickey received a warrant from the Commonwealth of Pennsylvania for a 250-acre (1.0 km^{2}) tract of land known as "Hermitage". John Moore, a surveyor, pursuant to the warrant, issued a survey showing 251 acres (1.02 km^{2}) of land. Robert Dickey conveyed Hermitage to Joseph Baldridge by deed dated February 18, 1797. The Commonwealth of Pennsylvania, through the offices of Governor Thomas Mifflin, issued a patent to Joseph Buldridge for the tract of land known as Hermitage on April 1, 1797.

Joseph Baldridge, another settler that built a mill in the area, was conveyed a deed for a 251-acre (1.02 km^{2}) tract of land known as "Hermitage" in 1797. Lots on the land began to be sold in 1800. Alexander Young recorded the lots sold in 1815, and after a dispute between the names Martinsburg and Youngstown, the town received its name on April 3, 1816. General Arthur St. Clair, who had retired near Youngstown, died near his home there, “Hermitage”, in 1818. The Greensburg-Stoystown Turnpike was constructed along the old Forbes road in 1819, leading to more traffic and prosperity for the borough, which was now the largest town and served as a market place, with taverns, blacksmiths, wagon makers, harness shops and a variety of other merchants, and a post office for the region. The community continued to grow and on April 2, 1831, the citizens formally formed the borough as a political government. J. G. Karns was the first Burgess of Youngstown.

The Pennsylvania Railroad introduced train service through neighboring Latrobe in 1852, leading to a decline as merchants moved closer to the railway and the Greensburg-Stoystown Turnpike was less frequently used. As the automobile became popular, the turnpike became the Lincoln Highway which brought traffic through Youngstown. U.S. Route 30, constructed in the 1930s, bypassed Youngstown, leading it to become a quiet residential community. The Kingston House, a center for trade and commerce and hotel dating from 1800, was listed in the National Register of Historical Places on June 30, 1983.

=== Timeline Of Youngstown History ===
1758 Forbes Road was completed

1769 Pennsylvania Government Land Office opened

1794 Whiskey insurrection - Troops were quartered at the Barrett Hotel

1799-1800 Youngstown Borough laid out

1819 Greensburgh-Stoystown Turnpike completed

1831 Youngstown incorporated by Act of Assembly

1852 Completion of the Pennsylvania Railroad through Latrobe

1861 Youngstown was an enlistment center for the Civil War

November 9, 1909 Council voted to enter into contract with West Penn Electric Company for placing and maintaining four arc lights on the main street of town.

October, 1916 Council ordered the borough weigh scales removed from Main Street.

March 6, 1918 Council adopted the contract of the State Highway Department for street paving.

August, 1818 - Arthur St. Clair, General in the Continental Army, member of the Continental Congress and the 9th President of the United States in Congress Assembled in 1798, the first Governor of the Northwest Territory, the first Commander of the U.S. Army, 1791–92) died in poverty on the Old State Road between Ligonier and Youngstown, when he was riding a wagon into town and probably had a stroke. He lived on top of the Laurel Ridge in a home and land given to him by his son Daniel. (There is a state marker at the site of his house, the house being torn down many years ago.) Arthur had run an inn where travelers stopped for food and supplies for their horses. His wife Phoebe was an invalid by this time and she died a week later. Both are buried under a Masonic monument in St. Clair park one block from the courthouse in Greensburg. His daughter, Louisa St. Clair Robb, and her six children were living with Arthur and Phoebe as were Elizabeth St. Clair Lawrence (a widow) and her children.

Arthur and his family left Hermitage around 1810, when the property was foreclosed by his creditors and all of his personal and real property was sold to satisfy debts. These debts had been incurred mostly when Arthur St. Clair signed his bond for Indian Treaties as well as other expenses in the Northwest Territory for which Congress authorized the funds, but never appropriated the money, leaving St. Clair without reimbursement. Also, debts due him from funds loaned to the government for the costs of the Revolution were never reimbursed, the government claimed that the statute of limitations had expired!

The old Hermitage house was torn down back in the 1950s and a Mrs. Mellon got word of it and had the parlor severed from the house and trucked to the new location of what would be the Ligonier Museum. The museum was built around the parlor. Mrs. Mellon authorized funds to purchase many of the things that were auctioned in the 1810 foreclosure sale and had them placed in the parlor and also in the collection of the museum. It is said that Arthur told his children to continue to petition the government for their inheritance, and in 1857 Congress appropriated $30,000 (which was a fraction of what was due) to the Arthur St. Clair Memorial, to be divided to the six branches of the family, with each branch receiving $5,000.

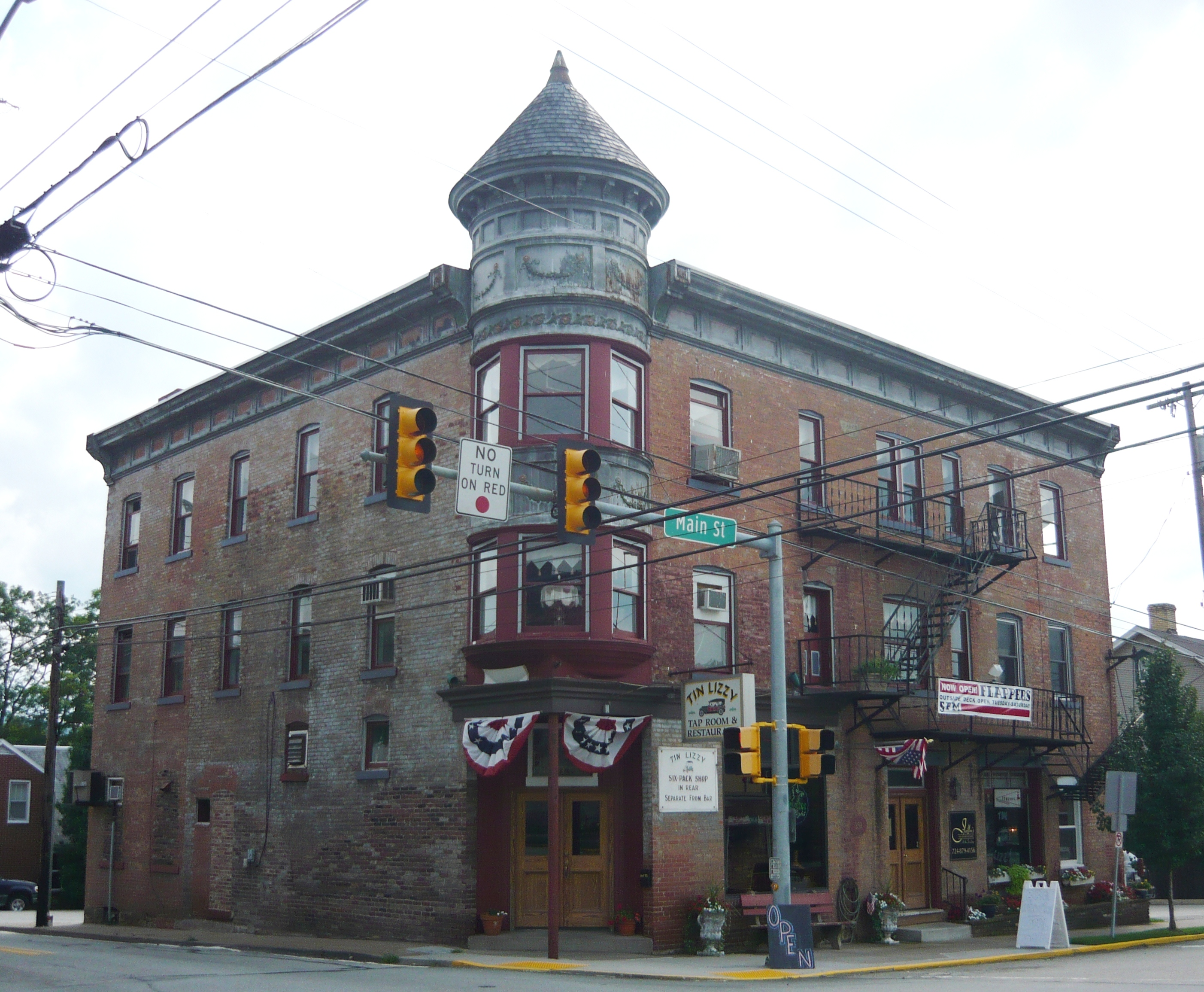
Youngstown Hotel Tin Lizzy Restaurant

== Geography ==
Youngstown is located at 40°16′51″N 79°21′56″W (40.280956, -79.365529).

According to the United States Census Bureau, the borough has a total area of 0.1 square miles (0.26 km^{2}), all land.

Adjacent to Youngstown lie Solomon's Temple Ridge and Sugarbush Ridge, sometimes known collectively as Youngstown Ridge.

The famed Latrobe Country Club, home course of golfing great Arnold Palmer, lies just outside the southwestern limits of Youngstown.

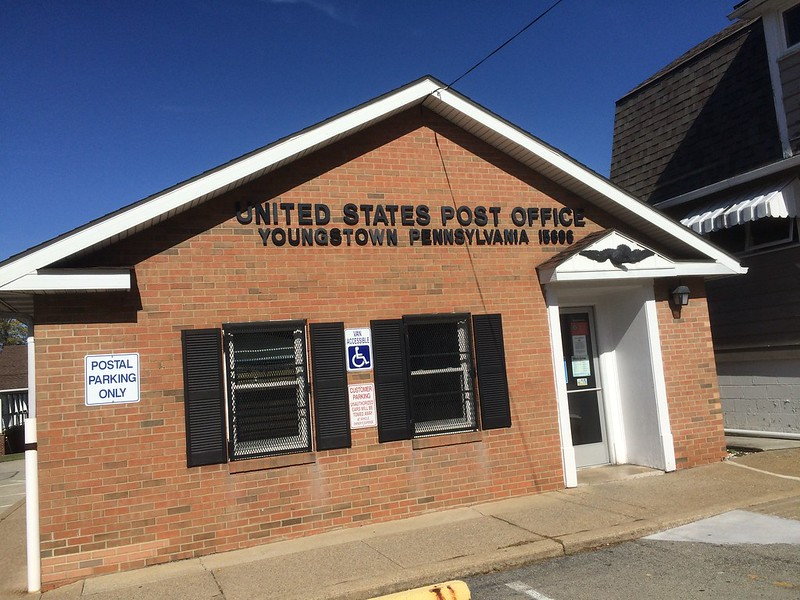
US Post Office, 312 Main St, Youngstown, PA 15696

== Demographics ==
Historical population
Census	Pop.	Note	%±
1850	454		—
1860	360		−20.7%
1870	301		−16.4%
1880	294		−2.3%
1890	486		65.3%
1900	318		−34.6%
1910	323		1.6%
1920	426		31.9%
1930	482		13.1%
1940	547		13.5%
1950	577		5.5%
1960	590		2.3%
1970	478		−19.0%
1980	470		−1.7%
1990	370		−21.3%
2000	400		8.1%
2010	326		−18.5%
2020	252		−22.7%

As of the census of 2000, there were 400 people, 177 households, and 98 families residing in the borough. The population density was 3,909.7 inhabitants per square mile (1,509.5/km^{2}). There were 189 housing units at an average density of 1,847.3 units per square mile (713.2 units/km^{2}). The racial makeup of the borough was 99.50% White and 0.50% Native American. Hispanic or Latino of any race were 0.25% of the population.

There were 177 households, out of which 24.3% had children under the age of 18 living with them, 40.7% were married couples living together, 7.9% had a female householder with no husband present, and 44.6% were non-families. 37.3% of all households were made up of individuals, and 14.7% had someone living alone who was 65 years of age or older. The average household size was 2.24 and the average family size was 3.04.

In the borough the population was spread out, with 21.5% under the age of 18, 6.3% from 18 to 24, 30.0% from 25 to 44, 26.5% from 45 to 64, and 15.8% who were 65 years of age or older. The median age was 41 years. For every 100 females there were 85.2 males. For every 100 females age 18 and over, there were 88.0 males.

The median income for a household in the borough was $31,029, and the median income for a family was $34,167. Males had a median income of $26,964 versus $22,188 for females. The per capita income for the borough was $14,677. About 16.1% of families and 20.4% of the population were below the poverty line, including 12.5% of those under age 18 and 25.0% of those age 65 or over.

Ancestries: German (26.2%), Italian (19.0%), Polish (16.0%), Slovak (9.6%), English (8.7%), Hungarian (6.4%).
