= Saint Vincent Beer =

Beer brewed by monks in Pennsylvania, U.S.

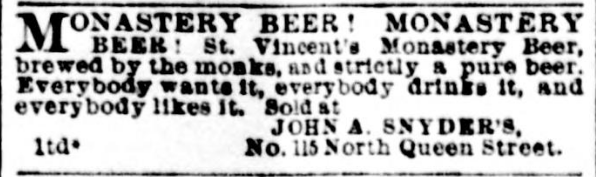
An 1887 advertisement for Saint Vincent Beer in the Lancaster Daily Intelligencer

Saint Vincent Beer was a dark lager brewed by monks at Saint Vincent Archabbey in Unity Township, Pennsylvania, United States, between 1856 and 1918. Pope Pius IX granted the monks permission to brew in 1852, ending a dispute with the Diocese of Pittsburgh. The brewery was located in a log cabin near the Saint Vincent Archabbey Gristmill and a brick building supplemented the cabin in 1868. After production ceased, the monastery used the buildings for storage until they burned down in 1926. The walls were removed from the site in 1995 during the restoration of the gristmill.

Production peaked at around 1,100 barrels in 1891. The popularity and widespread availability of the beer brought the monastery to the attention of the Catholic temperance movement. The theologian and professor Francesco Satolli, then the Apostolic Delegate to the United States, wrote to Archabbot Leander Schnerr asking for the brewing to cease in 1895. As part of a media campaign against the monastery, temperance advocate and Catholic priest George Zurcher published Monks and Their Decline in 1898 criticizing the archabbey for supporting the production and distribution of alcohol.

The negative press ended its external sale by 1900, although the monks continued to produce the drink for internal consumption for another 18 years. Aurelius Stehle closed the brewery in 1918 after he was elected coadjutor archabbot. Several conflicting accounts exist concerning what became of its recipe. Local legend holds the monastery sold it to another brewery; however, the archabbey claims that it was never recorded and lost.

== Early years ==
Boniface Wimmer emigrated to the United States from modern-day Germany where monks brewed beer in abbeys. In 1848, he and a group of novices settled in Unity Township, Pennsylvania, near Latrobe, and established Saint Vincent Archabbey. The next year, one of Wimmer's nephews was entrusted to deliver a gift of "several hundred dollars" to the archabby from the Luidwig Missionsverein. The gift was embezzled by the nephew and, to pay off the debit, Wimmer purchased a tavern and brewery in Indiana, Pennsylvania for the nephew to, unsuccessfully, run. Michael O'Connor, the Bishop of Pittsburgh and a temperance supporter, objected to monastic ownership of both establishments. Wimmer agreed to close the tavern but sought to retain the brewery. This upset O'Connor and he refused to grant the community that Wimmer founded status as a priory. Wimmer appealed O'Connor's refusal to Pope Pius IX during a trip to Rome, but was denied. In January 1852, Wimmer sold the brewery. Through pressure from Cardinal Giacomo Filippo Fransoni and King Ludwig I of Bavaria, the monks gained permission from Pius IX, a month later, to brew beer "providing that every disorder is avoided". Included was permission to sell the beverage wholesale.

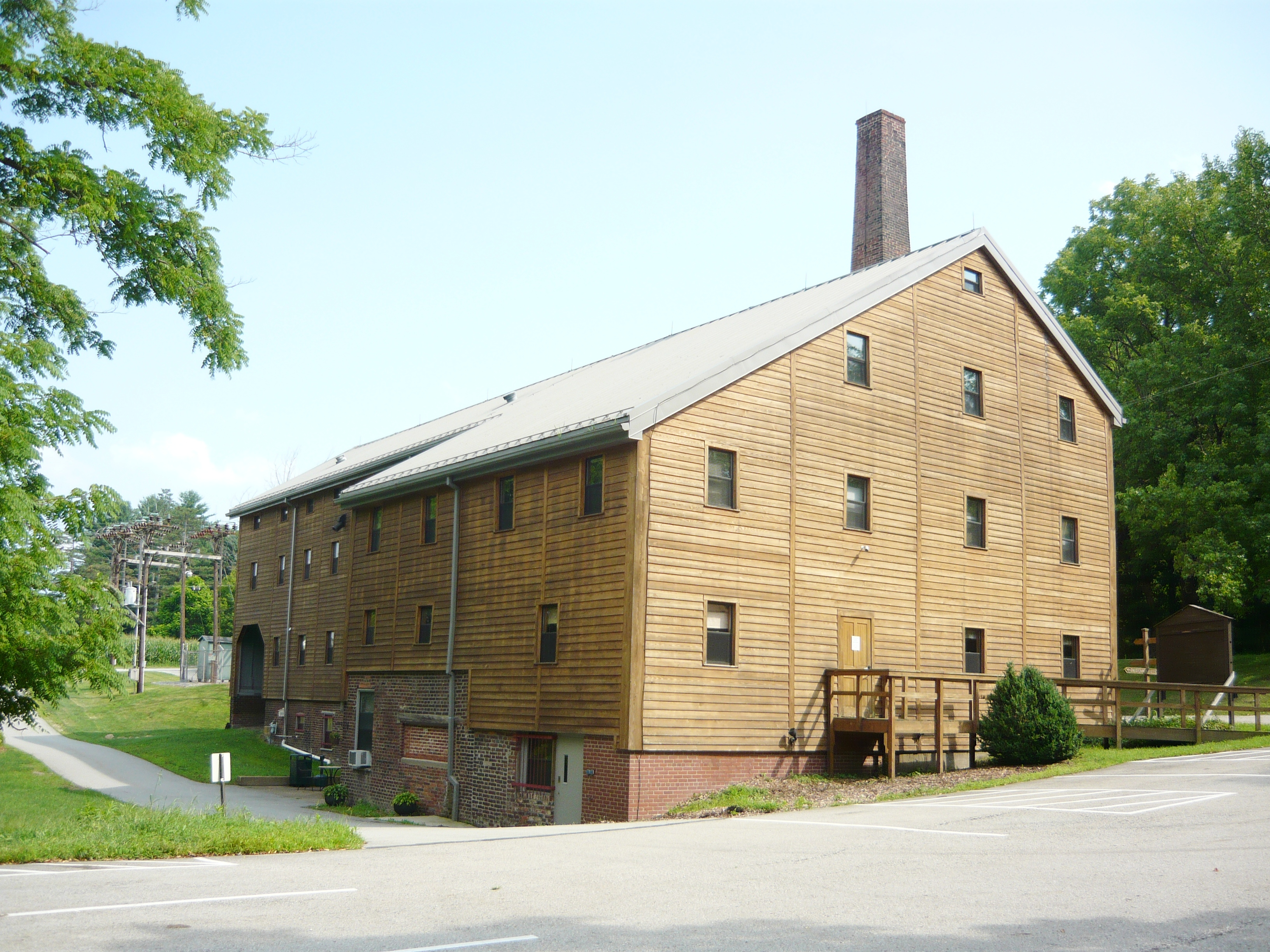
The brewery buildings sat in what is now the parking lot for the gristmill.

In 1856, the first Saint Vincent Beer was manufactured when the archabbey established a brewery in a small log building next to the archabbey's gristmill. To avoid further confrontation with O'Connor, Saint Vincent Beer was not made available for widespread sale until he resigned in 1860. Once established, the drink sold well and could be found as far away from the monastery as Baltimore and New York City by 1868. To meet demand, a new two-story brick brewery building was constructed next to the old one. This began the golden age of Saint Vincent Beer, which lasted through 1888.

By 1868 the monastery was producing about 900 U.S. beer barrels (100,000 liters; 30,000 U.S. gallons; 20,000 imperial gallons) per year, with an output that peaked in 1891 at 1,119 barrels. For each barrel sold in 1868 at a $14 (equivalent to $340 in 2025) wholesale price, the archabbey made $3 (equivalent to $70 in 2025). Other contemporary buildings added included a malt house (erected in 1873), two ice houses (erected in 1876 and 1881), cellars for storing the finished beverage, and a cooper house where barrels were produced by the monks.

== Beer Fuss ==
During the 1890s, Saint Vincent's golden age ended in controversy. The growing temperance movement in the United States condemned the archabbey in a era that became known as the "Beer Fuss" or "Beer Controversy" At the time, the Catholic Church was working to reduce alcoholism among recent immigrants to the United States. At the Third Plenary Council of Baltimore, a resolution from reformist clergy banning monasteries from manufacturing beer was defeated, but a milder one chastising lay members who sold alcohol and encouraging them to enter another profession passed. Catholic temperance advocates saw the production and sale of the beverage by the monks as personally shameful and actively undermining of the church's ministry. Omer Klein, an archivist at Saint Vincent College, considers intra-Catholic ethnic conflicts between Irish-American Catholics and the German-American archabbey as the cause of the Beer Fuss. Jerome Oetgen, a historian of the archabbey, recounts how they drew criticism from Irish-Americans but counters that many of the staunchest critics were fellow German-Americans.

The Beer Fuss began in 1892 after Andrew Hintenach, the second archabbot and in place for only four and a half years, resigned in disagreement over the manufacturing of alcohol. The "Abstinence Society" began the same year to pressure the monastery to cease manufacture. In 1895, the parish priest Ferdinand Kittell wrote to Leander Schnerr, the third archabbot, asking him to end the archabbey selling the drink to the public. Kittell wrote:

No complaint is made of the brewery itself, or your right of making or using beer; that is your own affair which we have no right to meddle. But for the fact of your selling it, and it being advertised in secular papers as "on tap" in various saloons, is regretted by the clergy of the diocese without exception, for it brings odium on the Church and shame on our people.

Schnerr declined Kittell's request given the permission the monastery received in 1852 from Pope Pius IX. Since the local diocese did not control the monastery, Kittell petitioned Francesco Satolli, the Apostolic Delegate to the United States, to stop the archabbey from selling Saint Vincent Beer. Satolli did not forward Kittell's letter to Pope Leo XIII but wrote to Schnerr asking him to stop the large-scale production of alcohol due to the "evil of intemperance" and the work of the Catholic temperance movement. Kittell also applied pressure from within the church and engaged in a media campaign against the monks by writing anti-Saint Vincent Archabbey articles in the Catholic Citizen and the Western Watchman. Kittell suggested that the archabbey and its seminary and college take after the University of Notre Dame, a thriving Catholic institution of higher education that did not need to produce alcohol to balance its finances.

The Catholic priest and temperance advocate George Zurcher released his Monks and Their Decline pamphlet in 1898. Zurcher criticized the archabbey for brewing and not joining the temperance movement and mocked the post-nominal letters of Benedictines, OSB, claiming that they should stand for "the Order of Sacred Brewers", claiming the monks were contributing to the drunkenness of lay Catholics. The pamphlet brought the monastery into the popular consciousness outside of Pennsylvania. After being prompted by Martin Ignatius Joseph Griffin, a prominent historian of the Catholic Church, the New York Voice, a newspaper run by the Prohibition Party, released a "sensationalized exposé" about the archabbey, college, and brewery in April 1898. The monks responded with silence and the media lost interest in the story.

== Decline ==
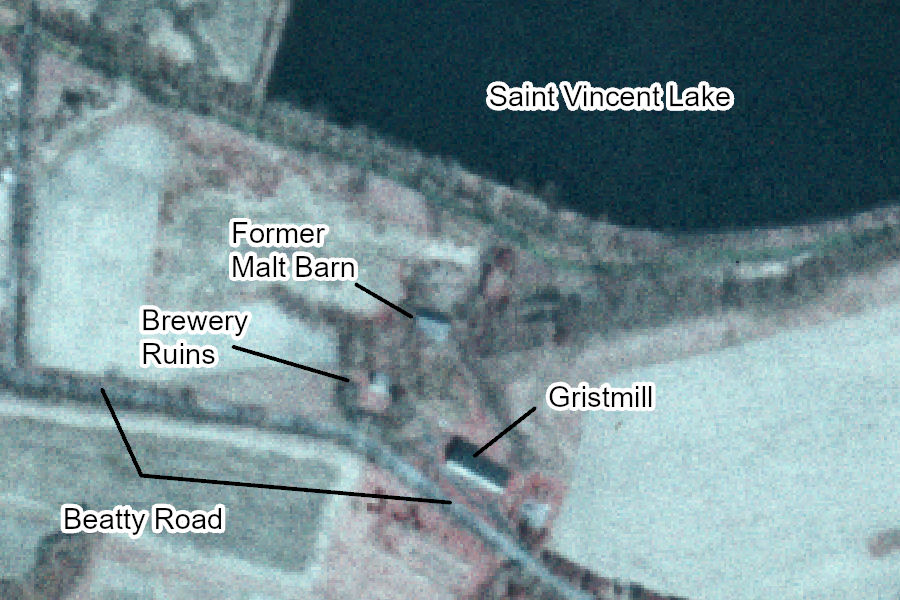
Ruins of the brewery site beside the gristmill and Saint Vincent Lake in 1982

Due to the negative publicity and pressure from temperance groups, the monastery discontinued sales on April 29, 1899. For the next 18 years, the monks continued to brew the beverage for internal use. The brewery closed after Aurelius Stehle was elected coadjutor archabbot in 1918. The following year the Eighteenth Amendment to the United States Constitution was ratified, which started the Prohibition era. Officially, the brewery building was used for storage for the farm in subsequent years, but monks may have made some bootleg beer there as well. On January 13, 1926, most of the brewery buildings burned down in the middle of the night. The ruins of the brewery complex stood until 1995 when they were demolished during the restoration of the gristmill. The previous year, the archabbey's insurer refused to cover the gristmill and brewery site due to its deterioration.

There are several conflicting accounts of what became of its recipe; local legend has it that the monks sold it to either the Latrobe Brewing Company or the Loyalhanna Brewing Company. The Latrobe Bulletin speculated in 2003 that the Loyalhanna Brewing Company's Monastery Beer was either the Saint Vincent Beer recipe or just named after Saint Vincent Archabbey. According to the monastery, the recipe was not written down and was lost when the brewmaster died. More recently, a monk, named only as 'Father Thomas', claimed in a 2009 NPR segment that the recipe was not lost, but merely "not accessible" to the public.

== Description ==
The drink was a thick, dark, and hoppy lager, which local curator Lauren Lamendola described as "made in the tradition of authentic Bavarian breweries". The Pittsburgh Press praised the beverage's purity, quality, and slow brewing process. Monks harvested the necessary crops from the archabbey's fields, then malted and fermented the beer with water and hops on-site. They also aged the beer in open vats before barrelling it into casks produced on site. When they sold it, they did so in limited quantities to one or two bars in a town.
