= October 14 =

October 14 this year in various calendars
- Wednesday, 14 October 2026
Akan	Fowukuo
Armenian	26 Sahmi 1476
Aztec	Izcalli 12, 5 Cōātl
Babylonian	1 Tashritu, 2337 SE
Balinese pawukon	Luang, Pepet, Pasah, Jaya, Wage, Tungleh, Buda of Kelawu, Kala, Dangu, Pati
Bengali	29 Ashshin, BS 1433
Chinese	Yin Metal Rooster・Chariot Mansion; Fire Horse Year, Month 9, Day 5 (Hanlu, 9 days until Shuangjiang)
Common Era	14 October 2026 CE
Coptic	4 Paopi, AM 1743
Egyptian	1 Phamenoth, 2775 NE
Ethiopian	4 Ṭeqemt, 2019 Amätä Məhrät
French Republican	Décade III, Duodi de Vendémiaire de l'Année 235 de la République
Gregorian	14 October, AD 2026
Hebrew	3 Cheshvan, AM 5787
Hindu	Anurādhā・Ayuṣmān; Solar: 28 Āśvina, 1948 SE; Lunisolar: Caturthī, Śukla pakṣa of Āśvina, 2083 VE; Rāudra・5127 KY・1,872,862
Icelandic	Miðvikudagur, 21 Haustmánuður 2026
Islamic	2 Jumada al-awwal, AH 1448 (using tabular method)
ISO week date	2026-W42-3
Japanese	4 Nagatsuki, Reiwa 8 (Kanro, 9 days until Sōkō)
Julian	1 October, AD 2026 (AM 7535)
Julian day	2461328
Korean	4 Gaedal, 4359 DE
Maya	13.0.14.0.5; 18 Yax, 5 Chicchan
Roman	Kalendis Octobribus, MMDCCLXXIX AUC
Solar Hijri	22 Mehr, SH 1405
Tibetan	4 tha skar, me pho rta 2153 or 1772 or 1000

<<	October					>>
Su	Mo	Tu	We	Th	Fr	Sa
				1	2	3
4	5	6	7	8	9	10
11	12	13	14	15	16	17
18	19	20	21	22	23	24
25	26	27	28	29	30	31
2026

October 14 in recent years
2026 (Wednesday)
2025 (Tuesday)
2024 (Monday)
2023 (Saturday)
2022 (Friday)
2021 (Thursday)
2020 (Wednesday)
2019 (Monday)
2018 (Sunday)
2017 (Saturday)

October 14 is the 287th day of the year (288th in leap years) in the Gregorian calendar; 78 days remain until the end of the year.

== Events ==
=== Pre-1600 ===
- 996 – Al-Hakim bi-Amr Allah becomes caliph. He is the first Fatimid ruler to have been born in Egypt and arguably the most controversial member of the dynasty.
- 1066 – The Norman conquest of England begins with the Battle of Hastings.
- 1322 – Robert the Bruce of Scotland defeats King Edward II of England at the Battle of Old Byland, forcing Edward to accept Scotland's independence.
- 1586 – Mary, Queen of Scots, goes on trial for conspiracy against Queen Elizabeth I of England.

=== 1601–1900 ===
- 1656 – The General Court of the Massachusetts Bay Colony enacts the first punitive legislation against the Religious Society of Friends.
- 1676 – After superior Ottoman forces fail to break through Polish defenses under Jan Sobieski in the battle of Żurawno, the Ottoman commander initiates negotiations.
- 1758 – Seven Years' War: Frederick the Great suffers a rare defeat at the Battle of Hochkirch.
- 1773 – The first recorded ministry of education, the Commission of National Education, is formed in the Polish–Lithuanian Commonwealth.
- 1774 – American Revolution: The First Continental Congress denounces the British Parliament's Intolerable Acts and demands British concessions.
- 1791 – The revolutionary group the United Irishmen is formed in Belfast, Ireland leading to the Irish Rebellion of 1798.
- 1805 – War of the Third Coalition: A French corps defeats an Austrian attempt to escape encirclement at Ulm.
- 1806 – War of the Fourth Coalition: Napoleon decisively defeats Prussia at the Battle of Jena–Auerstedt.
- 1808 – The Republic of Ragusa is annexed by France.
- 1809 – The Treaty of Schönbrunn is signed, ending the War of the Fifth Coalition, the final successful war in Napoleon Bonaparte's military career.
- 1843 – Irish nationalist Daniel O'Connell is arrested by the British on charges of criminal conspiracy.
- 1863 – American Civil War: Confederate troops under the command of A. P. Hill fail to drive the Union Army completely out of Virginia.
- 1884 – George Eastman receives a U.S. Government patent on his new paper-strip photographic film.
- 1888 – Louis Le Prince films the first motion picture, Roundhay Garden Scene.
- 1898 – The steam ship SS Mohegan sinks near the Lizard peninsula, Cornwall, killing 106.

=== 1901–present ===
- 1908 – The Chicago Cubs defeat the Detroit Tigers, 2–0, clinching the 1908 World Series; this would be their last until winning the 2016 World Series.
- 1910 – English aviator Claude Grahame-White lands his aircraft on Executive Avenue near the White House in Washington, D.C.
- 1912 – Former president Theodore Roosevelt is shot and mildly wounded by John Flammang Schrank in Milwaukee, Wisconsin. With the fresh wound in his chest, and the bullet still within it, Roosevelt delivers his scheduled speech.
- 1913 – Senghenydd colliery disaster, the United Kingdom's worst coal mining accident, claims the lives of 439 miners.
- 1915 – World War I: Bulgaria joins the Central Powers.
- 1920 – Finland and Soviet Russia sign the Treaty of Tartu, exchanging some territories.
- 1923 – After the Irish Civil War the 1923 Irish hunger strikes were undertaken by thousands of Irish republican prisoners protesting the continuation of their internment without trial.
- 1924 – The Tajik Autonomous Soviet Socialist Republic is created as an autonomous republic within the Uzbek Soviet Socialist Republic.
- 1930 – The former and first President of Finland, K. J. Ståhlberg, and his wife, Ester Ståhlberg, are kidnapped from their home by members of the far-right Lapua Movement.
- 1933 – Germany withdraws from the League of Nations and World Disarmament Conference.
- 1939 – World War II: The German submarine U-47 sinks the British battleship HMS Royal Oak within her harbour at Scapa Flow, Scotland.
- 1940 – World War II: The Balham underground station disaster kills sixty-six people during the London Blitz.
- 1942 – World War II: The German submarine U-69 sinks the Canadian passenger ferry SS Caribou approximately 20 nautical miles southwest of Port aux Basques, Newfoundland.
- 1943 – World War II: Prisoners at Sobibor extermination camp covertly assassinate most of the on-duty SS officers and then stage a mass breakout.
- 1943 – World War II: The United States Eighth Air Force loses 60 of 291 B-17 Flying Fortresses during the Second Raid on Schweinfurt.
- 1943 – World War II: The Second Philippine Republic, a puppet state of Japan, is inaugurated with José P. Laurel as its president.
- 1947 – Flying the Bell X-1 over Muroc Army Air Field in California, Captain Chuck Yeager breaks the sound barrier in level flight, reaching Mach 1.05.
- 1949 – The Smith Act trials of Communist Party leaders in the United States convicts eleven defendants of conspiring to advocate the violent overthrow of the federal government.
- 1952 – Korean War: The Battle of Triangle Hill is the biggest and bloodiest battle of 1952.
- 1956 – Dr. B. R. Ambedkar, leader of India's Untouchable caste, converts to Buddhism along with 385,000 of his followers (see Neo-Buddhism).
- 1957 – The 23rd Canadian Parliament becomes the only one to be personally opened by the Queen of Canada.
- 1957 – At least 81 people are killed in the most devastating flood in the history of the Spanish city of Valencia.
- 1962 – The Cuban Missile Crisis begins when an American reconnaissance aircraft takes photographs of Soviet ballistic missiles being installed in Cuba.
- 1964 – Martin Luther King Jr. receives the Nobel Peace Prize for combating racial inequality through nonviolence.
- 1964 – The Soviet Presidium and the Communist Party Central Committee each vote to accept Nikita Khrushchev's "voluntary" request to retire from his offices.
- 1966 – The city of Montreal begins the operation of its underground Montreal Metro rapid transit system.
- 1966 – The Dutch Cals cabinet fell after Norbert Schmelzer, the leader of the government party, filed a successful motion against the budget, in what later became known as the Night of Schmelzer.
- 1968 – Apollo program: The first live television broadcast by American astronauts in orbit is performed by the Apollo 7 crew.
- 1968 – The 6.5 M_{w} Meckering earthquake shakes the southwest portion of Western Australia with a maximum Mercalli intensity of IX (Violent), causing $2.2 million in damage and leaving 20–28 people injured.
- 1968 – Jim Hines becomes the first man ever to break the so-called "ten-second barrier" in the 100-meter sprint with a time of 9.95 seconds.
- 1973 – In the Thammasat student uprising, over 100,000 people protest in Thailand against the military government. Seventy-seven are killed and 857 are injured by soldiers.
- 1975 – An RAF Avro Vulcan bomber explodes and crashes over Żabbar, Malta after an aborted landing, killing five crew members and one person on the ground.
- 1979 – The first National March on Washington for Lesbian and Gay Rights draws approximately 100,000 people.
- 1980 – The 6th Congress of the Workers' Party ended, having anointed North Korean President Kim Il Sung's son Kim Jong Il as his successor.
- 1981 – Vice President Hosni Mubarak is elected as the President of Egypt, one week after the assassination of Anwar Sadat.
- 1982 – U.S. President Ronald Reagan proclaims a war on drugs.
- 1991 – Burmese opposition leader Aung San Suu Kyi is awarded the Nobel Peace Prize.
- 1994 – Yasser Arafat, Yitzhak Rabin and Shimon Peres receive the Nobel Peace Prize for their role in the establishment of the Oslo Accords and the framing of future Palestinian self government.
- 1998 – Eric Rudolph is charged with six bombings, including the 1996 Centennial Olympic Park bombing in Atlanta, Georgia.
- 2003 – The Steve Bartman Incident takes place at Wrigley Field in Chicago, Illinois.
- 2004 – MK Airlines Flight 1602 crashes during takeoff from Halifax Stanfield International Airport, killing all seven people on board.
- 2004 – Pinnacle Airlines Flight 3701 crashes in Jefferson City, Missouri. The two pilots (the aircraft's only occupants) are killed.
- 2012 – Felix Baumgartner successfully jumps to Earth from a balloon in the stratosphere.
- 2014 – A snowstorm and avalanche in the Nepalese Himalayas triggered by the remnants of Cyclone Hudhud kills 43 people.
- 2014 – The Serbia vs. Albania UEFA qualifying match is canceled after 42 minutes due to several incidents on and off the pitch. Albania is eventually awarded a win.
- 2015 – A suicide bomb attack in Tonsa, Pakistan kills at least seven people and injures 13 others.
- 2017 – An Al-Shabaab suicide bomber detonated a massive truck bomb at the Zobe junction in Somalia's capital, Mogadishu, killing 587 people, injuring 316 others, and leaving more than 500 missing.
- 2021 – About 10,000 American employees of John Deere go on strike.
- 2023 – Australians vote to reject a constitutional amendment that would have established an Indigenous Voice to Parliament.
- 2025 – A coup d'état successfully overthrows Malagasy president Andry Rajoelina.

== Births ==
=== Pre-1600 ===
- 1257 – Przemysł II of Poland (died 1296)
- 1404 – Marie of Anjou (died 1463)
- 1420 – Tomas de Torquemada, Grand Inquisitor during Spanish Inquisition (died 1498)
- 1425 – Alesso Baldovinetti, Italian painter (died 1499)
- 1465 – Konrad Peutinger, German humanist and antiquarian (died 1547)
- 1493 – Shimazu Tadayoshi, Japanese daimyō (died 1568)
- 1542 – Philip IV, Count of Nassau-Weilburg (died 1602)
- 1563 – Jodocus Hondius, Flemish engraver and cartographer (died 1611)
- 1569 – Giambattista Marino, Italian poet (died 1625)

=== 1601–1900 ===
- 1609 – Ernest Günther, Duke of Schleswig-Holstein-Sonderburg-Augustenburg (died 1689)
- 1630 – Sophia of Hanover (died 1714)
- 1633 – James II of England (died 1701)
- 1639 – Simon van der Stel, Dutch commander and politician, 1st Governor of the Dutch Cape Colony (died 1712)
- 1643 – Bahadur Shah I, Mughal emperor (died 1712)
- 1644 – William Penn, English businessman who founded Pennsylvania (died 1718)
- 1687 – Robert Simson, Scottish mathematician and academic (died 1768)
- 1712 – George Grenville, English lawyer and politician, Prime Minister of Great Britain (died 1770)
- 1726 – Charles Middleton, 1st Baron Barham, Scottish-English admiral and politician (died 1813)
- 1733 – François Sébastien Charles Joseph de Croix, Count of Clerfayt, Austrian field marshal (died 1798)
- 1784 – Ferdinand VII (died 1833)
- 1791 – Friedrich Parrot, Baltic German naturalist (died 1841)
- 1801 – Joseph Plateau, Belgian physicist and academic, created the Phenakistoscope (died 1883)
- 1806 – Preston King, American lawyer and politician (died 1865)
- 1824 – Adolphe Monticelli, French painter (died 1886)
- 1840 – Dmitry Pisarev, Russian author and critic (died 1868)
- 1842 – Joe Start, American baseball player and manager (died 1927)
- 1844 – John See, English-Australian politician, 14th Premier of New South Wales (died 1907)
- 1845 – Laura Askew Haygood, American educator and missionary (died 1900)
- 1848 – Byron Edmund Walker, Canadian banker and philanthropist (died 1924)
- 1853 – John William Kendrick, American engineer and businessman (died 1924)
- 1861 – Julia A. Ames, American journalist, editor, and reformer (died 1891)
- 1867 – Masaoka Shiki, Japanese poet, author, and critic (died 1902)
- 1869 – Joseph Duveen, 1st Baron Duveen, English art dealer (died 1939)
- 1871 – Alexander von Zemlinsky, Austrian composer, conductor, and teacher (died 1942)
- 1872 – Reginald Doherty, English tennis player (died 1910)
- 1882 – Éamon de Valera, American-Irish rebel and politician, 3rd President of Ireland (died 1975)
- 1882 – Charlie Parker, English cricketer, coach, and umpire (died 1959)
- 1888 – Katherine Mansfield, New Zealand novelist, short story writer, and essayist (died 1923)
- 1888 – Yukio Sakurauchi, Japanese businessman and politician, 27th Japanese Minister of Finance (died 1947)
- 1890 – Dwight D. Eisenhower, American general and politician, 34th President of the United States (died 1969)
- 1892 – Sumner Welles, American politician and diplomat, 11th Under Secretary of State (died 1961)
- 1893 – Lois Lenski, American author and illustrator (died 1974)
- 1893 – Lillian Gish, American actress (died 1993)
- 1894 – E. E. Cummings, American poet and playwright (died 1962)
- 1894 – Victoria Drummond, British marine engineer (died 1978)
- 1894 – Sail Mohamed, Algerian anarchist and Spanish Civil War veteran (died 1953)
- 1897 – Alicja Dorabialska, Polish chemist (died 1975)
- 1898 – Thomas William Holmes, Canadian sergeant and pilot, Victoria Cross recipient (died 1950)
- 1900 – W. Edwards Deming, American statistician, author, and academic (died 1993)

=== 1901–present ===
- 1902 – Learco Guerra, Italian cyclist and manager (died 1963)
- 1904 – Christian Pineau, French politician, French Minister of Foreign Affairs (died 1995)
- 1904 – Mikhail Pervukhin, Soviet politician, First Deputy Premier of the Soviet Union (died 1978)
- 1906 – Hassan al-Banna, Egyptian religious leader, founded the Muslim Brotherhood (died 1949)
- 1906 – Hannah Arendt, German-American philosopher and theorist (died 1975)
- 1907 – Allan Jones, American actor and singer (died 1992)
- 1909 – Mochitsura Hashimoto, Japanese commander (died 2000)
- 1909 – Dorothy Kingsley, American screenwriter and producer (died 1997)
- 1909 – Bernd Rosemeyer, German racing driver (died 1938)
- 1910 – John Wooden, American basketball player and coach (died 2010)
- 1911 – Lê Đức Thọ, Vietnamese general and politician, Nobel Prize laureate (died 1990)
- 1914 – Harry Brecheen, American baseball player and coach (died 2004)
- 1914 – Raymond Davis Jr., American chemist and physicist, Nobel Prize laureate (died 2006)
- 1914 – Alexis Rannit, Estonian poet and critic (died 1985)
- 1915 – Loris Francesco Capovilla, Italian cardinal (died 2016)
- 1916 – C. Everett Koop, American admiral and surgeon, 13th United States Surgeon General (died 2013)
- 1918 – Marcel Chaput, Canadian biochemist, journalist, and politician (died 1991)
- 1918 – Thelma Coyne Long, Australian tennis player and captain (died 2015)
- 1921 – José Arraño Acevedo, Chilean journalist and historian (died 2009)
- 1923 – Joel Barnett, English accountant and politician, Chief Secretary to the Treasury (died 2014)
- 1926 – Willy Alberti, Dutch singer and actor (died 1985)
- 1927 – Roger Moore, English actor and producer (died 2017)
- 1928 – Joyce Bryant, American actress and singer (died 2022)
- 1928 – Gary Graffman, American concert pianist (died 2025)
- 1928 – Frank E. Resnik, American chemist and businessman (died 1995)
- 1928 – Mary Tsingou, American mathematician and programmer of MANIAC (died 2026)
- 1929 – Yvon Durelle, Canadian boxer and wrestler (died 2007)
- 1930 – Robert Parker, American singer and saxophonist (died 2020)
- 1930 – Mobutu Sese Seko, Congolese soldier and politician, President of Zaire (died 1997)
- 1930 – Alan Williams, Welsh journalist and politician, Shadow Secretary of State for Wales (died 2014)
- 1936 – Hans Kraay Sr., Dutch footballer and manager (died 2017)
- 1936 – Jürg Schubiger, Swiss psychotherapist and author (died 2014)
- 1938 – John Dean, American lawyer and author, 13th White House Counsel
- 1938 – Shula Marks, South African historian and academic
- 1938 – Melba Montgomery, American country music singer (died 2025)
- 1938 – Farah Pahlavi, Empress of Iran
- 1939 – Ralph Lauren, American fashion designer, founded the Ralph Lauren Corporation
- 1940 – Perrie Mans, South African snooker player (died 2023)
- 1940 – Cliff Richard, Indian-English singer-songwriter and actor
- 1940 – J. C. Snead, American golfer (died 2025)
- 1941 – Jerry Glanville, American football player and coach
- 1941 – Eddie Keher, Irish sportsman
- 1941 – Laurie Lawrence, Australian rugby player and coach
- 1941 – Art Shamsky, American baseball player and manager
- 1941 – Roger Taylor, English tennis player
- 1942 – Bob Hiller, English rugby player
- 1942 – Evelio Javier, Filipino lawyer and politician (died 1986)
- 1942 – Péter Nádas, Hungarian author and playwright (died 2026)
- 1942 – Suzzanna, Indonesian actress (died 2008)
- 1943 – Mohammad Khatami, Iranian scholar and politician, 5th President of Iran
- 1944 – Udo Kier, German-American actor and director (died 2025)
- 1945 – Daan Jippes, Dutch author and illustrator
- 1945 – Lesley Joseph, English actress
- 1946 – François Bozizé, Gabonese general and politician, President of the Central African Republic
- 1946 – Joey de Leon, Filipino comedian, actor and television host
- 1946 – Justin Hayward, English singer-songwriter and guitarist
- 1946 – Dan McCafferty, Scottish singer-songwriter (died 2022)
- 1946 – Craig Venter, American biologist, geneticist, and academic (died 2026)
- 1947 – Nikolai Volkoff, Croatian-American wrestler (died 2018)
- 1948 – Marcia Barrett, Jamaican-English singer
- 1948 – Norman Ornstein, American political scientist and scholar
- 1949 – Damian Lau, Hong Kong actor, director, and producer
- 1949 – Katha Pollitt, American poet and author
- 1949 – Dave Schultz, Canadian ice hockey player and referee
- 1950 – Joey Travolta, American actor, director, and producer
- 1951 – Aad van den Hoek, Dutch cyclist
- 1952 – Harry Anderson, American actor and screenwriter (died 2018)
- 1952 – Nikolai Andrianov, Russian gymnast and coach (died 2011)
- 1952 – Rick Aviles, American comedian and actor (died 1995)
- 1953 – Greg Evigan, American actor
- 1953 – Kazumi Watanabe, Japanese guitarist and composer
- 1954 – Mordechai Vanunu, Moroccan-Israeli technician and academic
- 1955 – Iwona Blazwick, English curator and critic
- 1955 – Arleen Sorkin, American actress, producer, and screenwriter (died 2023)
- 1956 – Chris Bangle, American automotive designer
- 1956 – Ümit Besen, Turkish singer-songwriter
- 1956 – Beth Daniel, American golfer
- 1956 – Jennell Jaquays, American game designer (died 2024)
- 1957 – Michel Després, Canadian lawyer and politician
- 1957 – Gen Nakatani, Japanese lawyer and politician, 13th Japanese Minister of Defense
- 1958 – Thomas Dolby, English singer-songwriter and producer
- 1959 – Alexei Kasatonov, Russian ice hockey player
- 1959 – A. J. Pero, American drummer (died 2015)
- 1960 – Steve Cram, English runner and coach
- 1960 – Zbigniew Kruszyński, Polish footballer and coach
- 1961 – Isaac Mizrahi, American fashion designer
- 1962 – Jaan Ehlvest, Estonian chess player
- 1962 – Trevor Goddard, English-American actor (died 2003)
- 1962 – Chris Thomas King, American singer-songwriter, guitarist, producer, and actor
- 1962 – Shahar Perkiss, Israeli tennis player
- 1963 – Lori Petty, American actress
- 1964 – Joe Girardi, American baseball player and manager
- 1965 – Steve Coogan, English actor, comedian, producer, and screenwriter
- 1965 – Jüri Jaanson, Estonian rower and politician
- 1965 – Constantine Koukias, Greek-Australian flute player and composer
- 1965 – Karyn White, American singer-songwriter
- 1967 – Pat Kelly, American baseball player, coach, and manager
- 1967 – Sylvain Lefebvre, Canadian ice hockey player and coach
- 1967 – Werner Daehn, German actor
- 1967 – Jason Plato, British racing driver
- 1967 – Stephen A. Smith, American sports television personality
- 1968 – Jay Ferguson, Canadian guitarist and songwriter
- 1968 – Johnny Goudie, American singer-songwriter, guitarist, producer, and actor
- 1968 – Matthew Le Tissier, English footballer and journalist
- 1968 – Dwayne Schintzius, American basketball player and coach (died 2012)
- 1969 – P. J. Brown, American basketball player
- 1969 – Viktor Onopko, Russian footballer and manager
- 1969 – David Strickland, American actor (died 1999)
- 1970 – Martin Barbarič, Czech footballer and coach (died 2013)
- 1970 – Jim Jackson, American basketball player and sportscaster
- 1970 – Meelis Lindmaa, Estonian footballer
- 1970 – Hiromi Nagasaku, Japanese actress and singer
- 1970 – Jon Seda, American actor
- 1970 – Vasko Vassilev, Bulgarian violinist
- 1970 – Pär Zetterberg, Swedish footballer
- 1971 – Jorge Costa, Portuguese footballer and manager (died 2025)
- 1971 – Robert Jaworski Jr., Filipino basketball player and politician
- 1972 – Erika deLone, American tennis player
- 1972 – Julian O'Neill, Australian rugby league player
- 1973 – Thom Brooks, American-British political philosopher and legal scholar
- 1973 – George Floyd, American police brutality victim (died 2020)
- 1973 – Lasha Zhvania, Georgian businessman and politician
- 1974 – Jessica Drake, American porn actress and director
- 1974 – Natalie Maines, American singer-songwriter
- 1974 – Tümer Metin, Turkish footballer
- 1974 – Viktor Röthlin, Swiss runner
- 1974 – Samuel, Brazilian footballer
- 1975 – Michael Duberry, English footballer
- 1975 – Floyd Landis, American cyclist
- 1975 – Shaznay Lewis, English singer and songwriter
- 1975 – Carlos Spencer, New Zealand rugby player
- 1976 – Tillakaratne Dilshan, Sri Lankan cricketer
- 1976 – Daniel Tjärnqvist, Swedish ice hockey player
- 1977 – Saeed Ajmal, Pakistani cricketer
- 1977 – Barry Ditewig, Dutch footballer
- 1977 – Kelly Schumacher, American-Canadian basketball and volleyball player
- 1978 – Justin Lee Brannan, American guitarist and songwriter, and politician
- 1978 – Paul Hunter, English snooker player (died 2006)
- 1978 – Jana Macurová, Czech tennis player
- 1978 – Steven Thompson, Scottish footballer
- 1978 – Usher, American singer-songwriter, dancer, and actor
- 1979 – Stacy Keibler, American wrestler and actress
- 1979 – Liina-Grete Lilender, Estonian figure skater and coach
- 1980 – Paúl Ambrosi, Ecuadorian footballer
- 1980 – Amjad Khan, Danish-English cricketer
- 1980 – Scott Kooistra, American football player
- 1980 – Niels Lodberg, Danish footballer
- 1980 – Terrence McGee, American football player
- 1980 – Ben Whishaw, English actor
- 1981 – Gautam Gambhir, Indian cricketer
- 1982 – Ryan Hall, American runner
- 1982 – Carlos Mármol, Dominican baseball player
- 1982 – Matt Roth, American football player
- 1983 – Betty Heidler, German hammer thrower
- 1983 – Lin Dan, Chinese badminton player
- 1984 – LaRon Landry, American football player
- 1984 – Alex Scott, English footballer
- 1985 – Alexandre Sarnes Negrão, Brazilian racing driver
- 1985 – Alanna Nihell, Irish boxer
- 1985 – Ivan Pernar, Croatian Member of Parliament
- 1986 – Tom Craddock, English footballer
- 1986 – Wesley Matthews, American basketball player
- 1986 – Skyler Shaye, American actress
- 1987 – Jay Pharoah, American actor and comedian
- 1988 – Glenn Maxwell, Australian cricketer
- 1988 – Max Thieriot, American actor
- 1989 – Arca, Venezuelan musician
- 1990 – Jordan Clark, English cricketer
- 1992 – Ahmed Musa, Nigerian footballer
- 1993 – Ashton Agar, Australian cricketer
- 1993 – Charlie Kirk, American media personality and political activist (died 2025)
- 1994 – Joe Burgess, English rugby league player
- 1994 – Jaelen Feeney, Australian rugby league player
- 1994 – Jared Goff, American football player
- 1998 – Ariela Barer, American actress
- 1999 – Quinn Hughes, American ice hockey player
- 2001 – Rowan Blanchard, American actress
- 2003 – Tate Sandell, American college football player

== Deaths ==
=== Pre-1600 ===
- 530 – Antipope Dioscorus
- 841 – Shi Yuanzhong, Chinese governor
- 869 – Pang Xun, Chinese rebel leader
- 962 – Gerloc, Frankish noblewoman
- 996 – Al-Aziz Billah, Fatimid caliph (born 955)
- 1066 – Battle of Hastings:
  - Harold Godwinson, English king (born 1022)
  - Leofwine Godwinson, English nobleman and brother of Harold
  - Gyrth Godwinson, English nobleman and brother of Harold
- 1077 – Andronikos Doukas, Byzantine courtier (born 1022)
- 1092 – Nizam al-Mulk, Persian scholar and politician (born 1018)
- 1184 – Yusuf I, Almohad caliph (born 1135)
- 1213 – Geoffrey Fitz Peter, 1st Earl of Essex, English sheriff and Chief Justiciar
- 1217 – Isabella, English noblewoman and wife of John of England (born c. 1173)
- 1240 – Razia Sultana, female sultan of Delhi (born c. 1205)
- 1256 – Kujō Yoritsugu, Japanese shogun (born 1239)
- 1318 – Edward Bruce, High King of Ireland (born 1275)
- 1366 – Ibn Nubata, Arab poet (born 1287)
- 1416 – Henry the Mild, duke of Brunswick-Lüneburg
- 1536 – Garcilaso de la Vega, Spanish poet (born 1503)
- 1552 – Oswald Myconius, Swiss theologian and reformer (born 1488)
- 1565 – Thomas Chaloner, English poet and politician (born 1521)
- 1568 – Jacques Arcadelt, Dutch singer and composer (born 1507)

=== 1601–1900 ===
- 1610 – Amago Yoshihisa, Japanese daimyō (born 1540)
- 1618 – Gervase Clifton, 1st Baron Clifton, English nobleman (bornc. 1570)
- 1619 – Samuel Daniel, English poet and historian (born 1562)
- 1631 – Sophie of Mecklenburg-Güstrow, queen of Denmark and Norway (born 1557)
- 1637 – Gabriello Chiabrera, Italian poet (born 1552)
- 1669 – Antonio Cesti, Italian organist and composer (born 1623)
- 1703 – Thomas Kingo, Danish bishop and poet (born 1634)
- 1711 – Tewoflos, Ethiopian emperor (born 1708)
- 1758 – James Francis Edward Keith, Scottish-Prussian field marshal (born 1696)
- 1831 – Jean-Louis Pons, French astronomer and educator (born 1761)

=== 1901–present ===
- 1911 – John Marshall Harlan, American lawyer and politician (born 1833)
- 1923 – Marcellus Emants, Dutch-Swiss author, poet, and playwright (born 1848)
- 1929 – Henri Berger, German composer and bandleader (born 1844)
- 1930 – Samuel van Houten, Dutch lawyer and politician, Dutch Minister of the Interior (born 1837)
- 1942 – Noboru Yamaguchi, Japanese mob boss (born 1902)
- 1943 – Sobibór uprising:
  - Rudolf Beckmann, German SS officer (born 1910)
  - Siegfried Graetschus, German sergeant (born 1916)
  - Johann Niemann, German lieutenant (born 1913)
- 1944 – Erwin Rommel, German field marshal (born 1891)
- 1953 – Émile Sarrade, French rugby player and tug of war competitor (born 1877)
- 1953 – Kyuichi Tokuda, Japanese lawyer and politician (born 1894)
- 1958 – Douglas Mawson, Australian geologist, academic, and explorer (born 1882)
- 1958 – Nikolay Zabolotsky, Russian-Soviet poet and translator (born 1903)
- 1959 – Jack Davey, New Zealand-Australian singer and radio host (born 1907)
- 1959 – Errol Flynn, Australian-American actor, singer, and producer (born 1909)
- 1960 – Abram Ioffe, Russian physicist and academic (born 1880)
- 1961 – Paul Ramadier, French politician, 129th Prime Minister of France (born 1888)
- 1961 – Harriet Shaw Weaver, English journalist and activist (born 1876)
- 1965 – William Hogenson, American sprinter (born 1884)
- 1965 – Randall Jarrell, American poet and author (born 1914)
- 1966 – George Carstairs, Australian rugby league player (born 1900)
- 1966 – Arthur Folwell, English-Australian rugby league player, coach, and administrator (born 1904)
- 1967 – Marcel Aymé, French author and playwright (born 1902)
- 1969 – Haguroyama Masaji, Japanese sumo wrestler, the 36th Yokozuna (born 1914)
- 1969 – August Sang, Estonian poet and translator (born 1914)
- 1970 – Mavis Wheeler, English socialite and artist's model, also known for shooting her lover (born 1908)
- 1973 – Edmund A. Chester, American journalist and broadcaster (born 1897)
- 1973 – Ahmed Hamdi, Egyptian general and engineer (born 1929)
- 1976 – Edith Evans, English actress (born 1888)
- 1977 – Bing Crosby, American singer-songwriter and actor (born 1903)
- 1982 – Louis Rougier, French philosopher from the Vienna Circle (born 1889)
- 1983 – Willard Price, Canadian-American historian and author (born 1887)
- 1984 – Martin Ryle, English astronomer and physicist, Nobel Prize laureate (born 1918)
- 1985 – Emil Gilels, Ukrainian-Russian pianist (born 1916)
- 1986 – Keenan Wynn, American actor (born 1916)
- 1986 – Takahiko Yamanouchi, Japanese physicist (born 1902)
- 1990 – Leonard Bernstein, American pianist, composer, and conductor (born 1918)
- 1997 – Harold Robbins, American author (born 1915)
- 1998 – Cleveland Amory, American author and activist (born 1917)
- 1998 – Frankie Yankovic, American accordion player (born 1916)
- 1999 – Julius Nyerere, Tanzanian educator and politician, 1st President of Tanzania (born 1922)
- 2000 – Art Coulter, Canadian-American ice hockey player (born 1909)
- 2000 – Tony Roper, American race car driver (born 1964)
- 2002 – Norbert Schultze, German composer and conductor (born 1911)
- 2003 – Patrick Dalzel-Job, English linguist, commander, and navigator (born 1913)
- 2004 – Ted Blakey, American historian, activist, and businessman (born 1925)
- 2006 – Freddy Fender, American singer-songwriter and guitarist (born 1937)
- 2006 – Klaas Runia, Dutch theologian and journalist (born 1926)
- 2006 – Gerry Studds, American educator and politician (born 1937)
- 2008 – Robert Furman, American engineer and intelligence officer (born 1915)
- 2008 – Kazys Petkevičius, Lithuanian basketball player and coach (born 1926)
- 2009 – Martyn Sanderson, New Zealand actor and screenwriter (born 1938)
- 2009 – Collin Wilcox, American actress (born 1935)
- 2009 – Lou Albano, American professional wrestler (born 1933)
- 2010 – Simon MacCorkindale, English actor, director, and producer (born 1952)
- 2010 – Benoit Mandelbrot, Polish-American mathematician and economist (born 1924)
- 2011 – Reg Alcock, Canadian businessman and politician (born 1948)
- 2011 – Ashawna Hailey, American computer scientist and philanthropist (born 1949)
- 2012 – John Clive, English actor and author (born 1933)
- 2012 – Max Fatchen, Australian journalist and author (born 1920)
- 2012 – James R. Grover Jr., American lawyer and politician (born 1919)
- 2012 – Larry Sloan, American publisher, co-founded Price Stern Sloan (born 1922)
- 2012 – Arlen Specter, American lieutenant and politician (born 1930)
- 2012 – Dody Weston Thompson, American photographer (born 1923)
- 2012 – Gart Westerhout, Dutch-American astronomer and academic (born 1927)
- 2013 – Wally Bell, American baseball player and umpire (born 1965)
- 2013 – Max Cahner, German-Catalan historian and politician (born 1936)
- 2013 – Kōichi Iijima, Japanese author and poet (born 1930)
- 2013 – Bruno Metsu, French footballer and manager (born 1954)
- 2013 – Frank Moore, American painter and poet (born 1946)
- 2013 – Käty van der Mije-Nicolau, Romanian-Dutch chess player (born 1940)
- 2014 – A. H. Halsey, English sociologist and academic (born 1923)
- 2014 – Leonard Liggio, American author and academic (born 1933)
- 2014 – Elizabeth Peña, American actress (born 1959)
- 2015 – Nurlan Balgimbayev, Kazakh politician, 3rd Prime Minister of Kazakhstan (born 1947)
- 2015 – Mathieu Kérékou, Beninese soldier and politician, President of Benin (born 1933)
- 2015 – Margaret Keyes, American historian and academic (born 1918)
- 2015 – Radhakrishna Hariram Tahiliani, Indian admiral (born 1930)
- 2016 – Helen Kelly, New Zealand trade union leader (born 1964)
- 2019 – Harold Bloom, American literary critic (born 1930)
- 2019 – Sulli, South Korean actress, singer, and model (born 1994)
- 2021 – Lee Wan-koo, South Korean politician, 39th Prime Minister of South Korea
- 2022 – Robbie Coltrane, Scottish actor, comedian and writer (born 1950)
- 2024 – Thomas J. Donohue, American business executive (born 1938)
- 2024 – Tina Kaidanow, American diplomat and government official (born 1965)
- 2024 – Janet Nelson, British historian (born 1942)
- 2024 – Philip Zimbardo, American psychologist and academic (born 1933)
- 2025 – D'Angelo, American musician (born 1974)

== Holidays and observances ==
- Christian feast day:
  - Angadrisma
  - Fortunatus of Todi
  - Joseph Schereschewsky (Episcopal Church (USA))
  - Pope Callixtus I
  - Blessed Roman Lysko
  - October 14 (Eastern Orthodox liturgics)
  - Intercession of the Theotokos
- Day of the Cathedral of the Living Pillar (Georgian Orthodox Church)
- Mother's Day (Belarus)
- National Education Day (Poland), formerly Teachers' Day
- Nyerere Day (Tanzania)
- Second Revolution Day (Yemen)
- World Standards Day (International)
