= Leander Schnerr =

German-American Catholic priest and Benedictine monk (1836–1920)

The Right Reverend Leander Schnerr OSB
- Archabbot of Saint Vincent Archabbey
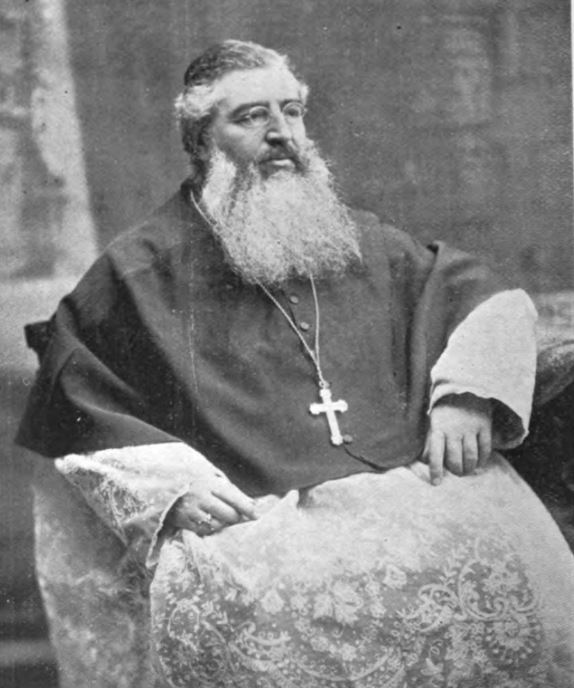
- Leander Schnerr in 1910
- Church: Catholic
- Elected: July 15, 1892
- Predecessor: Andrew Hintenach
- Successor: Aurelius Stehle

Orders
- Ordination: September 20, 1859 by George Aloysius Carrell
- Consecration: October 5, 1892 by Richard Phelan

Personal details
- Born: Karl Otto August Schnerr; September 27, 1836 Gommersdorf, Grand Duchy of Baden
- Died: September 3, 1920 (aged 83) Saint Vincent Archabbey
- Buried: Saint Vincent Cemetery
- Education: Saint Vincent College

Leander Schnerr OSB (September 27, 1836 – September 4, 1920) was a German-American Catholic priest and Benedictine monk who served as the archabbot of Saint Vincent Archabbey and president of Saint Vincent College from 1892 to 1920. Before being elected Archabbot, he had a career as a priest serving German-speaking parishes in Kentucky, Pennsylvania, and Illinois.

During his tenure as Archabbot, Schnerr grew the Archabbey, college, and Seminary. He resisted attempts from temperance advocates to stop the brewing of Saint Vincent Beer. In 1918, Aurelius Stehle was elected Coadjutor Archabbot and Schnerr retired from religious life. He died at Saint Vincent Archabbey in 1920 and is buried in the archabbey's cemetery.

== Early life ==
Karl Otto August Schnerr was born in Gommersdorf, Grand Duchy of Baden, on September 27, 1836, to Ernst Schnerr, a brewer, and Barbara Melly Schnerr. Despite the split faith of his parents, his mother was catholic and his father was Lutheran, Schnerr was baptized Catholic. He had one sister, Cecelia, who was a member of the School Sisters of Notre Dame.

In the 1840s, the Schnerr family moved from Germany to Baltimore, Maryland. A few years later, when Schnerr was 14, he matriculated to Saint Vincent College, where he would earn a degree in theology. He entered the novitiate in 1853 and made his solemn profession of vows on January 6, 1857 taking the name Leander. Two years later, on September 20, 1859, he was ordained a priest by bishop George Carrell of the Diocese of Covington.

== Parish Priest ==
After being ordained, Leander Schnerr was assigned as the pastor of various German-speaking parishes in Kentucky, Pennsylvania, and Illinois. In 1861, he was assigned to Saint Joseph's Parish in Covington, Kentucky, where he was the attending priest for two congregations in rural areas and taught at the parochial school attached to the parish. A few years later, Schnerr was assigned to Assumption University as a member of the faculty. He was moved to Butler, Pennsylvania, in 1866. Until 1872, Schnerr was reassigned to Saint Joseph's Church in Chicago, Illinois. There he served as the prior of the priory attached to the church. After the Great Chicago Fire, Schnerr informed Boniface Wimmer of the destruction of the priory, convent, and whole church.

He was recalled back to Saint Vincent Archabbey in 1872 to be the pastor of several churches in Western Pennsylvania. From August 1877 to 1892, he was the priest and rector of Saint Mary's Church in Pittsburgh, Pennsylvania. While at Saint Marry's, Schnerr proved himself to be a good parish priest. He led the parish to repay a large debt, built a new priory, expanded the parish's ministry, and helped found another parish to accommodate the large number of German-speaking Catholics in Pittsburgh.

== Archabbot ==
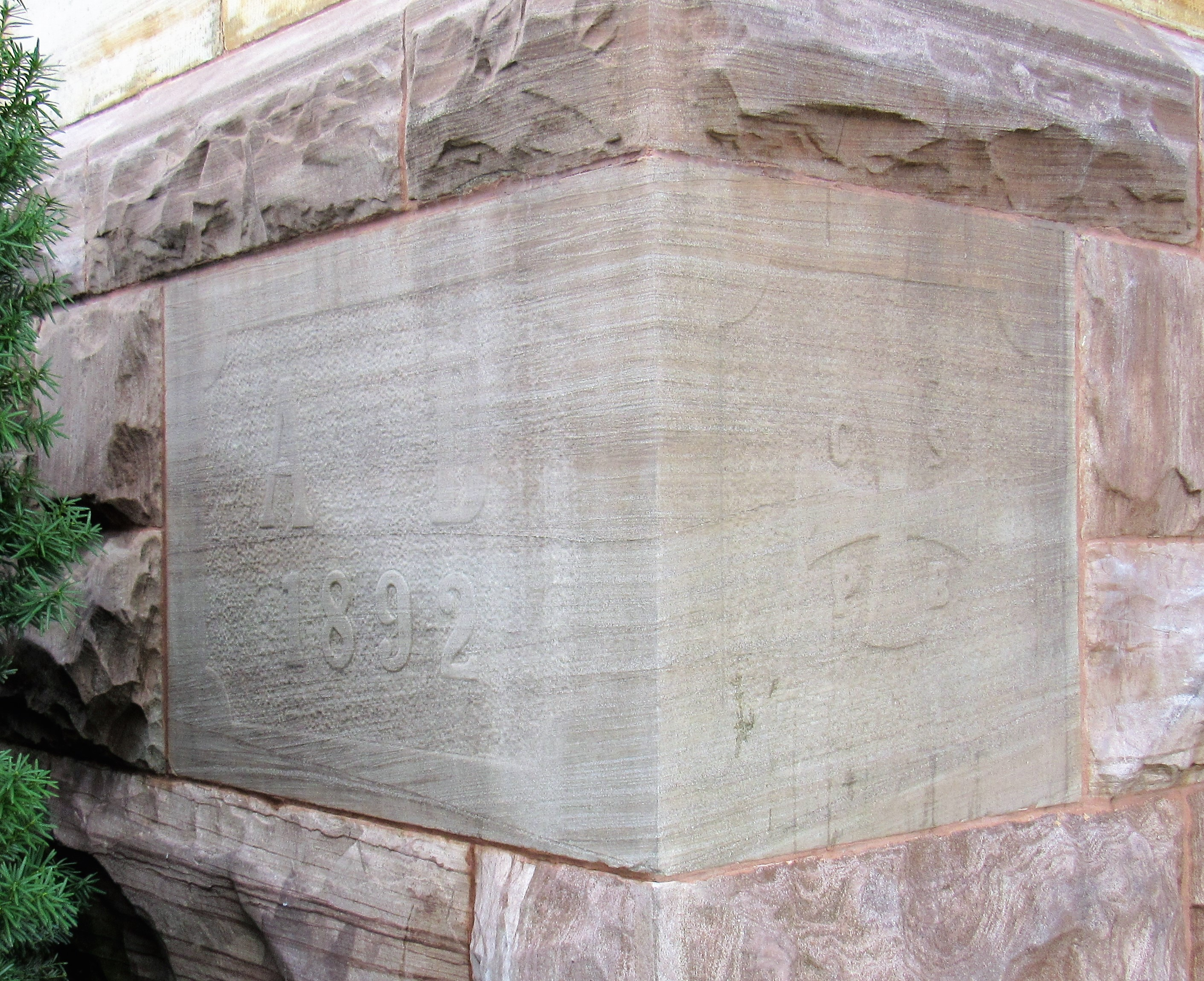
Cornerstone of Saint Vincent Basilica

On July 15, 1892, Leander Schnerr was elected the third archabbot of Saint Vincent Archabbey on the second ballot. He was consecrated on October 5 by Richard Phelan after receiving approval from Pope Leo XIII. Hundreds of Schnerr's former parishioners traveled from Pittsburgh to Latrobe for a celebration. As a part of the festivities, the cornerstone of Saint Vincent Basilica was laid. The church would be completed near the end of Schnerr's time as archabbot in 1905. In addition to the spiritual portion of the festivities, the monks hosted a feast for 400 guests in Schnerr's honor.

Schnerr saw the archabbey as an outwardly-focused institution that should play a role in the wider Catholic Church in the United States instead of an inwardly-focused one away from the world. To further this vision, Schnerr traveled extensively to represent the archabbey, seminary, and college. He visited the American Katholikentag in 1892. The next year, he attended the meeting in Rome that established the Benedictine Confederation and the World's Columbian Exposition. Despite health issues, Schnerr maintained a busy travel schedule through the end of the decade.

=== Archabbey ===
Schnerr's time as archabbot was an era of major change in the archabbey. When he became archabbot, the monastery was fulfilling the role of ministering to German immigrants that Boniface Wimmer set out to do. In Schnerr's archabbotcy, the archabbey transitioned to providing pastoral care to new Eastern European immigrants. At the same time, Saint Vincent launched new missions in Colorado and Illinois. The college attached to the Colorado mission closed its doors in 1918, but Holy Cross Abbey, the result of several mergers, lasted until 2005. The mission to Illinois created St. Bede Academy, a Catholic high school for boys, and an Abbey.

The monastery had a demographic shift in Schnerr's archabbotcy. American-born monks went from 31% to 53% of the monastery's population. At the same time, German-American monks declined from 87% to 80%. The archabbey's work in the Deep South during Reconstruction brought the first African-American monks to Saint Vincent at this time. The build-up World War I in Europe sparked a vocational and demographic crisis in the archabbey. The monastery had long-relied on new immigrants from Germany to add to their ranks and the looming war prevented this from happening. Because of this, the average age of the priests in the monastery started to increase. By 1912, a third of the priests were over the age of 50.

The monastery brewed Saint Vincent Beer during the totality of Schnerr's time as archabbot. This brought the archabbey into conflict with the growing Temperance Movement and parish priests in the surrounding diocese. Due to the conflict, Apostolic Nuncio Francesco Satolli wrote to Schnerr asking him to stop brewing the beer in large quantities for sale. Due to the pressure, the archabbey reduced the amount of beer brewed and earmarked it only for internal consumption. In 1918, the brewery was closed when Aurelius Stehle was elected coadjutor archabbot.

=== College and seminary ===
When Schnerr became archabbot, and therefore President of Saint Vincent College, the student body of the college and seminary was overwhelmingly of German descent. As his archabbotcy went on, the student body diversified as Americans of Irish, Italian, Cuban, and Eastern European descent became a larger proportion of the population of Southwestern Pennsylvania. This diversification led to German-American students dropping to a third of the students in 1920.

== Later life and death ==
On June 26, 1918, due to Schnerr's age and health, Aurelius Stehle, Schnerr's longtime secretary, was elected coadjutor archabbot. After Stehle's election, Schnerr participated in far fewer public events. On September 3, 1920, at 11:07 AM, Schnerr died after a long decline in health. He was buried at Saint Vincent Cemetery on September 9, 1920, after a Requiem Mass celebrated by Ernest Helmstetter, the abbot of St. Mary's Abbey in Morristown, New Jersey. Schnerr is memorialized by Leander Hall on the archabbey and college's campus which serves as the monastery's guest house and the home of seminarians.
