= Saint Vincent College =

Catholic college in Latrobe, Pennsylvania, U.S.

Coordinates: 40.2928°N 79.4021°W

- Former names: Saint Vincent Archabbey and College (1846–1870)
- Motto: Veri iustique scientia vindex
- Motto in English: Knowledge is the guardian of truth and justice
- Type: Private college
- Established: 1846; 180 years ago
- Religious affiliation: Roman Catholic (Benedictines)
- Academic affiliations: ACCU; CIC; NAICU
- Endowment: $113 million (2021)
- Chancellor: Martin de Porres Bartel
- President: Paul R. Taylor
- Faculty: 98 full-time, 78 part-time
- Students: 1313 (fall 2025)
- Undergraduates: 1,157 (fall 2025)
- Postgraduates: 156 (fall 2025)
- Location: Latrobe, Pennsylvania, United States
- Campus: 200 acres (81 ha); Suburban
- Colors: Blue and White (academic); Green and Gold (athletic)
- Nickname: Bearcats
- Sporting affiliations: NCAA Division III – PAC, ECAC
- Mascot: Bearcat
- Website: stvincent.edu

Saint Vincent College is a private Benedictine college in Unity Township, Pennsylvania, United States, with a Latrobe post office address. Founded in 1846 by Boniface Wimmer, a monk from Bavaria, it is operated by the Benedictine monks of Saint Vincent Archabbey, the first Benedictine monastery in the United States.

== History ==
Saint Vincent Archabbey and College was founded in 1846 by Boniface Wimmer, a monk from Metten Abbey in Bavaria. On April 18, 1870, the Pennsylvania state legislature incorporated the school as Saint Vincent College.

On January 28, 1963, a fire destroyed many of the buildings on campus including a student chapel and a bell tower.

Saint Vincent College became coeducational in 1983.

During Jim Towey's four-year tenure as president from 2006 until 2010, he stressed a more traditional Catholic identity. Towey attracted two high-profile commencement speakers: U.S. President George W. Bush in 2007 and Mike Tomlin, coach of the Pittsburgh Steelers in 2008. During this same time Towey encountered opposition from some of the faculty. While Towey attributed much of the dissension to his lack of experience in academia and to faculty unaccustomed to rapid change, in 2008 three-quarters of the school's tenured faculty signed a letter stating that several decisions made by Towey had caused a major crisis at the college. More than two years later, Towey left Saint Vincent College; he was named president of Ave Maria University in July 2011.

In November 2009, Mark Gruber, a Benedictine priest and faculty member who opposed Towey's reforms, was accused by the college administration of sexual misconduct. Following a deposition, lawyers for the administration stated that Gruber admitted under oath that he created pornographic materials on a college computer and e-mailed the images. On July 2, 2012, Catholic Church officials confirmed that "Gruber has been found guilty of the delicts (canonical crimes) of possession of child pornography; production of materials which gravely injure good morals; abuse of the Sacrament of Confession (but not a violation of the sacramental seal); and defamation of a legitimate superior." In July 2013, he was relieved of his monastic and priestly duties.

In 2018, Saint Vincent renamed a building on campus, after sexual abuse allegations were revealed about an early dean of the college. The former Alcuin Hall was renamed the Student Activity Center. The name changed after the St. Vincent Archabbey released a list on August 16, 2018, of a dozen Benedictines against whom credible allegations of sexual abuse had been made. That list included the Alcuin Tasch, whom the building was named after when it was completed in 1964.

=== Presidents ===
The current president of the college is Paul R. Taylor, a Benedictine priest. He succeeded Norman W. Hipps who served from 2010 to 2019.

Previous presidents of the college are:

- Boniface Wimmer (1871–1887)
- Andrew Hintenach (1887–1892)
- Leander Schnerr (1892–1920)
- Aurelius Stehle (1920–1930)
- Alfred Koch (1930–1950)
- Denis Strittmatter (1950–1955)
- Quentin Schaut (1955–1962)
- Maximilian Duman (1962–1963)
- Maynard Brennan (1963–1968)
- Fintan R. Shoniker (1968–1971)
- Cecil G. Diethrich (1971–1982)
- Augustine Flood (1982–1985)
- John F. Murtha (1985–1995)
- Martin R. Bartel (1995–2000)
- James F. Will (2000–2006)
- Jim Towey (2006–2010)
- Norman W. Hipps (2010–19)
- Paul R. Taylor (2019–)

== Campus ==
Saint Vincent College is located near the city of Latrobe, Pennsylvania. The campus is 200 acres and includes historic and modern college buildings.

The Fred Rogers Institute houses the archives of children's television host Fred Rogers and features an exhibit. The institute's building also contains the Foster and Muriel McCarl Coverlet Gallery.

The campus features natural and historic areas including Winnie Palmer Nature Reserve, Saint Vincent Wetlands, and Saint Vincent Gristmill.

== Academics ==
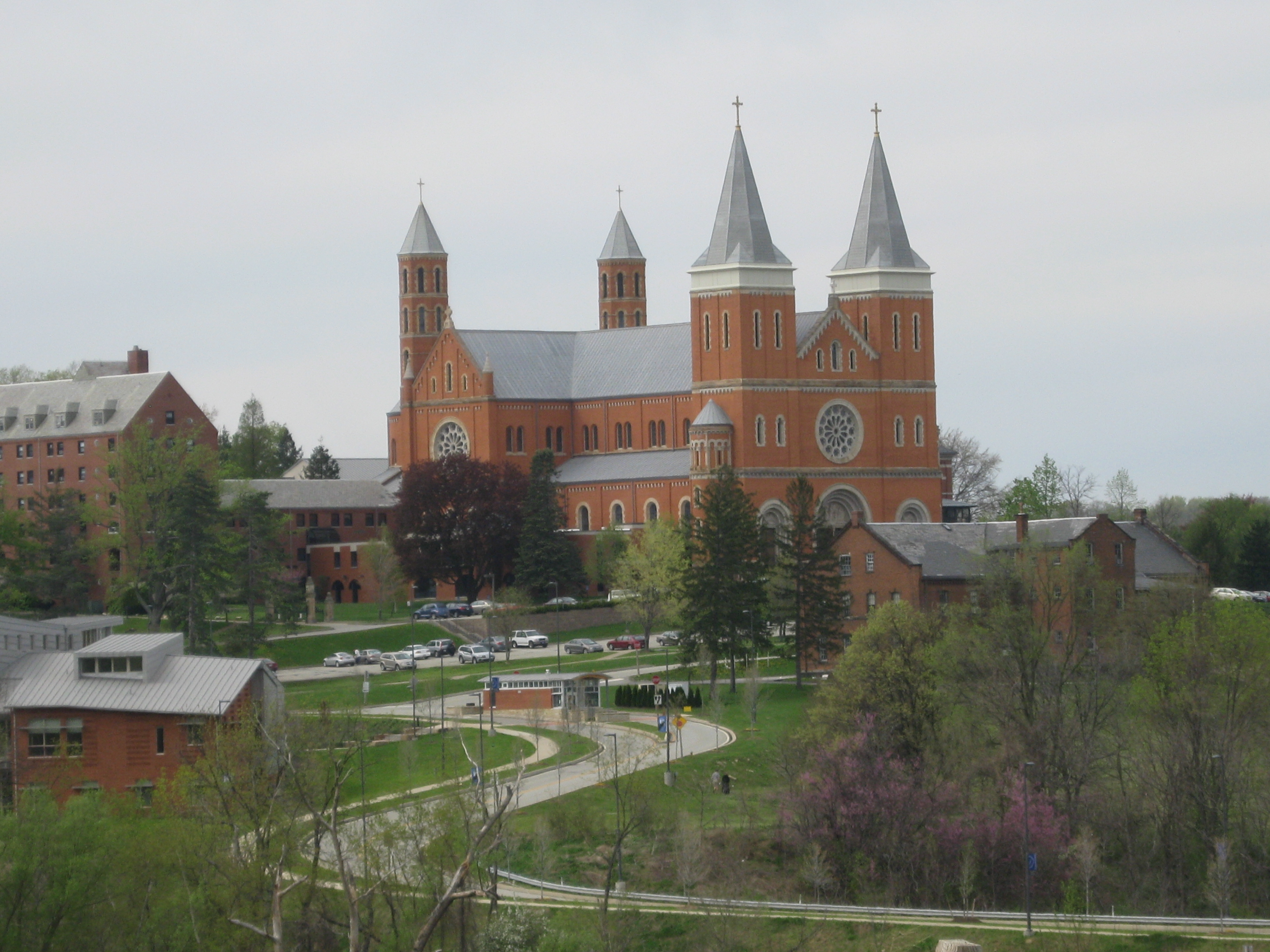
View from the entrance, with Basilica and some academic buildings

Saint Vincent is organized into three schools: School of Arts, Humanities, and Social Sciences; Alex G. McKenna School of Business, Economics, and Government; and Herbert W. Boyer School of Natural Sciences, Mathematics, and Computing. Each school has its own dean and a council of advisors composed of representatives of business, industry, and academia to advise and direct policy and programs.

== Basilica ==
Saint Vincent College Basilica

Saint Vincent Parish was founded in 1790. It was the first Catholic parish in Pennsylvania west of the Allegheny Mountains. Father Theodore Brouwers purchased 300 acres (121 ha) of land called "Sportsmen's Hall Tract." A church was built and dedicated on July 19, 1835. It was named after St. Vincent de Paul.

The cornerstone of the basilica was laid in 1892, and the consecration took place on August 24, 1905. The basilica was completely restored in 1996, as part of the 150th anniversary of the founding of the college.

== Traditions ==
Each year, on the Thursday before Thanksgiving, the Saint Vincent Community celebrates Founders Day, honoring all those who founded the college and have been a part of its community since its inception. The day features Honors Convocation (held in the Archabbey Basilica), a candle-lit turkey dinner in the gym, Zambelli fireworks, and the campus light-up, featuring lighted arches in Melvin Platz where the school's Concert Band performs Christmas-themed repertoire.

The Saint Vincent College fight song, "Forward, Saint Vincent," was approved by the college's student government in 1996 and was written by Jen Waldmann, Heather Fields, and Chris Rodkey. The title, "Forward, Saint Vincent," refers to a quotation from the school's founder, Boniface Wimmer: "Forward, always forward, everywhere forward! We must not be held back by debts, bad years, or by difficulties of the times. Man's adversity is God's opportunity." The fight song is performed by The March of the Bearcats Marching Band, along with other pep tunes at both football and basketball games.

There is a network of tunnels consisting of storage areas, maintenance rooms, and steam tunnels which runs underneath the Saint Vincent College campus. It is an unofficial tradition for students to enter and explore these tunnels.

== Athletics ==
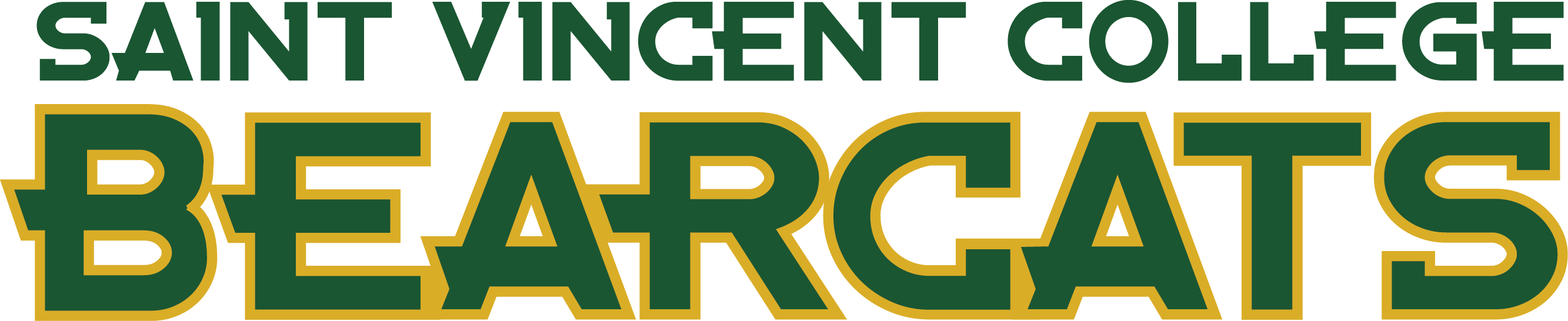
Saint Vincent athletics wordmark

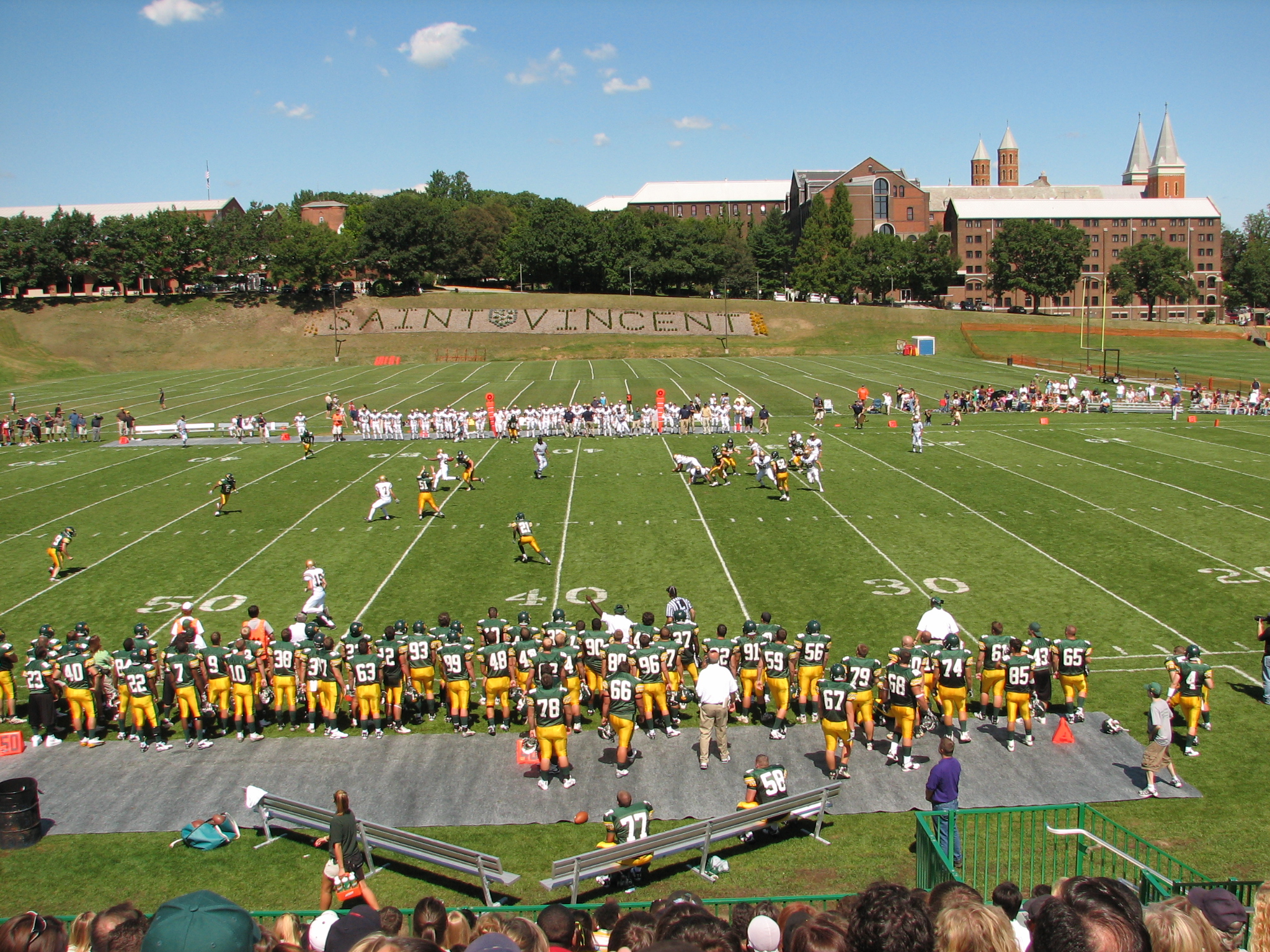
Saint Vincent football players during a game v Gallaudet in 2007

St. Vincent has intercollegiate teams, known as Bearcats, in women's bowling, football, baseball, softball, volleyball, basketball, cross country, golf, lacrosse, soccer, swimming, track, and tennis. The college is a member of the National Collegiate Athletic Association (NCAA). Almost all teams compete in the NCAA Division III Presidents' Athletic Conference (PAC). Two sports that are not sponsored by the PAC have other affiliations. In bowling, a sport with a single championship for all three NCAA divisions, the Bearcats compete in the Allegheny Mountain Collegiate Conference (AMCC).

The newest varsity sport of men's volleyball, introduced for the 2020 season (2019–20 school year), is playing its first season as a Division III independent until joining the AMCC for the 2021 season and beyond. The school also offers men's ice hockey and men's and women's rugby as club sports. The college also has an equestrian team that competes in the Intercollegiate Horse Show Association. One Saint Vincent basketball player, Daniel Santiago, has played in the NBA.

The athletic colors are green and gold.

=== Pittsburgh Steelers training camp ===
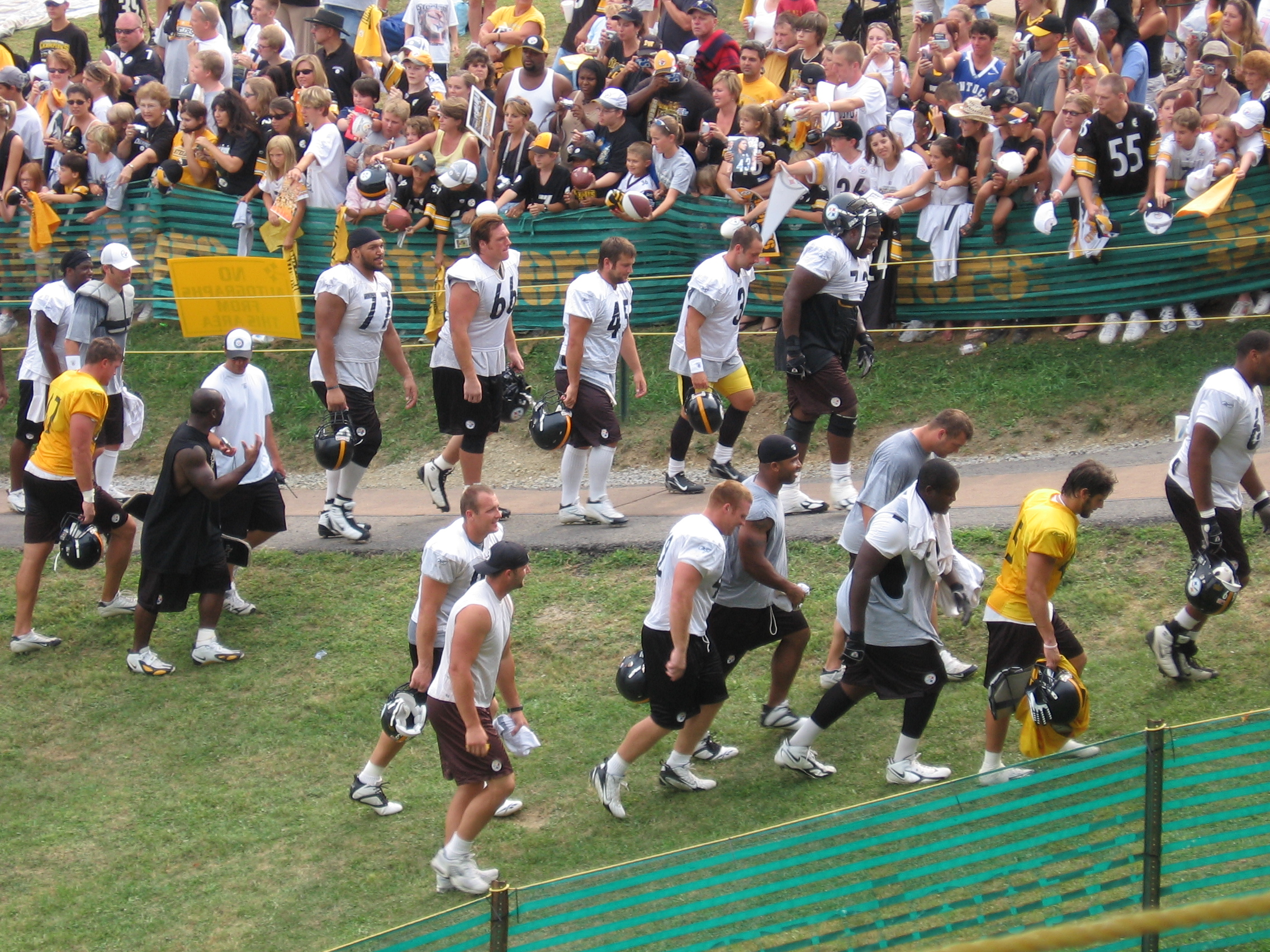
The Steelers at the St Vincent training camp in 2006

Since 1966, the college has served as the training camp host of the Pittsburgh Steelers. Before 1966, the team practiced at various locations around Pennsylvania and out of state including the University of Rhode Island. In 1963, the campus was damaged by a large fire and during the rebuilding, more buildings were added to the campus to provide more housing for players. Rooney Hall, completed in 1995, is a residence hall that is used by the Steelers during their stay on campus each summer. It is named in honor of the Steelers' founder, Arthur J. Rooney Sr.

Peter King of Sports Illustrated said about Chuck Noll Field, the site of training camp, "I love the place. It's the perfect training camp setting, looking out over the rolling hills of the Laurel Highlands in west-central Pennsylvania, an hour east of Pittsburgh. On a misty or foggy morning, standing atop the hill at the college, you feel like you're in Scotland. Classic, wonderful slice of Americana. If you can visit one training camp, this is the one to see."

=== Other sports ===
The main athletic center is the Robert S. Carey Student Center. It was formerly known as Sportsman's Hall, after the original name of St. Vincent Parish, and Kennedy Hall, after President John F. Kennedy, who received an honorary degree of law on February 4, 1958. It contains a gymnasium, swimming pool, student union, and fitness center.

In 2011, the Bearcat basketball team, led by All-American Brittany Sedlock, became the first team in school history to qualify for the NCAA Division-III postseason since the school made the move from the NAIA. Ranked among the top-20 nationally throughout the season, the Bearcats were defeated in their opening-round National Tournament game by Greensboro College. The women's basketball team overcame a major tragedy during the 2010–11 season with the Christmas Day 2010 death of Kristen Zawacki (1958–2010), the lone women's basketball coach in the program's 25-year history. Zawacki, also the school's associate athletic director, won over 500 games in her career. She was succeeded by assistant coach Jimmy Petruska, who was named interim coach immediately following her death, before being officially named the team's head coach on April 27, 2011. During his eight-year tenure, Petruska's teams have qualified for the NCAA Division III playoffs three times, highlighted by a 2018–19 season in which the Bearcats finished 23-5 overall and 15–1 in conference to earn their first PAC title.

In 2016, the Saint Vincent men's basketball team earned their fourth straight Presidents' Athletic Conference Tournament Championship by defeating Thomas More College 65–62 to advance to the NCAA National Tournament and advancing to the NCAA Tournament for the fourth straight season.

On June 27, 2017, the school named Brian Niemiec the head coach of the men's tennis team. In doing so, Niemiec became what is thought to be the youngest head coach of an NCAA team at the age of 21 years, 10 months, and 9 days.

The Saint Vincent women's lacrosse team, coached by Jym Walters, boasts the top scorer in NCAA Division III history. As a senior in 2018, Maggie Nelson set Division III records with 141 goals and 178 points. During her senior campaign, Nelson scored 10 or more goals in 11 different games, while her 19 points (11 goals, 8 assists) in an April 11 win over Chatham University were also the most in a single game in NCAA D-III history. Nelson was featured in Sports Illustrated's "Faces in the Crowd" on May 18, 2018. After the 2019 season, Nelson's 496 career points rank second all-time in NCAA Division III history.

== Notable alumni ==
- George W. Ahr
- Herbert Boyer
- Hugh Charles Boyle
- Richard Burkhauser
- Antony Davies
- John J. Degnan
- René Henry Gracida
- Daniel Hugh Kelly
- Adam Maida
- Regis McKenna
- Donald L. Miller
- David J. Novak
- Douglas Robert Nowicki
- Erskine Ramsay
- Frank E. Resnik
- Bill Rosendahl
- Peter V. Sampo
- Daniel Santiago
- Mark E. Seremet
- Rembert Weakland
- Erik Wells

== See also ==
- Saint Vincent Seminary
- List of Benedictine Colleges
