= Aurelius Stehle =

American Catholic Benedictine priest

Right Reverend Aurelius Aloysius Stehle O.S.B.
- Fourth Archabbot of St. Vincent Archabbey
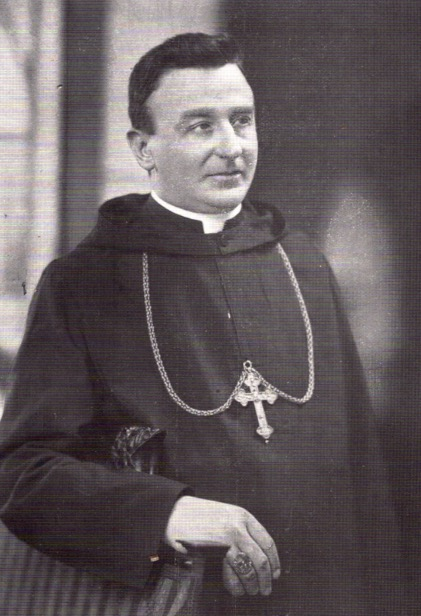
- Church: Catholic Church
- Elected: June 25, 1918
- Predecessor: Leander Schnerr
- Successor: Alfred Koch
- Previous posts: Rector, St. Vincent Seminary

Orders
- Ordination: September 8, 1899 by Regis Canevin

Personal details
- Born: April 30, 1877 Pittsburgh, Pennsylvania
- Died: February 13, 1930 (aged 53) St. Vincent Archabbey
- Buried: St. Vincent Cemetery
- Parents: Richard Stehle and Rose (Niggel) Stehle
- Education: Saint Vincent College; Saint Vincent Seminary; University of Notre Dame; Duquesne University

Aurelius Aloysius Stehle OSB (April 30, 1877 - February 12, 1930) was an American Catholic Benedictine priest and fourth archabbot of St. Vincent Archabbey in Latrobe, Pennsylvania.

== Biography ==
=== Early life ===
Aloysius Stehle was born on 30 April 1877, in Pittsburgh, Pennsylvania, and orphaned at a young age. In 1885, Boniface Wimmer took in both Aloysius and his older brother Joseph and they entered school at St. Vincent, where Stehle did quite well. Upon graduating, Aloysius decided to enter St. Vincent Archabbey, and made his first vows on 11 July 1893, taking the religious name Aurelius. In 1896 he took solemn vows and on December 8, 1899, was ordained a priest. The latter required a papal dispensation, as Catholic canon law then mandated that to be ordained a man must be 25, and Stehle was 24 at the time.

=== Priesthood ===
In 1920, he received his Doctor of Divinity in Rome, his Doctor of Law from the University of Notre Dame in 1925, and a doctorate in literature from Duquesne University in 1927. From shortly after his ordination in 1899 to his election as coadjutor abbot in 1918, Stehle served as a seminary professor, teaching Greek, English, Sacred Scripture, Latin, and Liturgy. Liturgy, especially, was of particular expertise for Stehle, having written The Manual for Episcopal Ceremonies, a book widely referenced by liturgists in the United States. He also served as the Master of ceremonies of the abbey for 25 years, and ensured that Pope Pius X's motu proprio Tra le sollecitudini was implemented in the music of the abbey church. During Stehle's leadership of St. Vincent Seminary as vice-rector in 1911, the institution came to be known as a center of doctrinal orthodoxy and conservatism, especially in the years following the condemnation of modernism by Pius X in Pascendi Dominici gregis.

=== Abbacy and Death ===
In 1917, archabbot Leander Schnerr's health began to fail and he petitioned the Holy See for permission to elect a coadjutor abbot. The solemnly professed monks of the abbey selected Stehle on June 25, 1918, and he accepted. Upon Schnerr's death on September 3, 1920, Stehle became the fourth archabbot of St. Vincent. This transition marked a new chapter in St. Vincent's history, as Aurelius was the first American-born archabbot of the community, the first to not have been directly educated by Boniface Wimmer, and was also the youngest man to hold the office in its history, being 41 upon becoming archabbot.

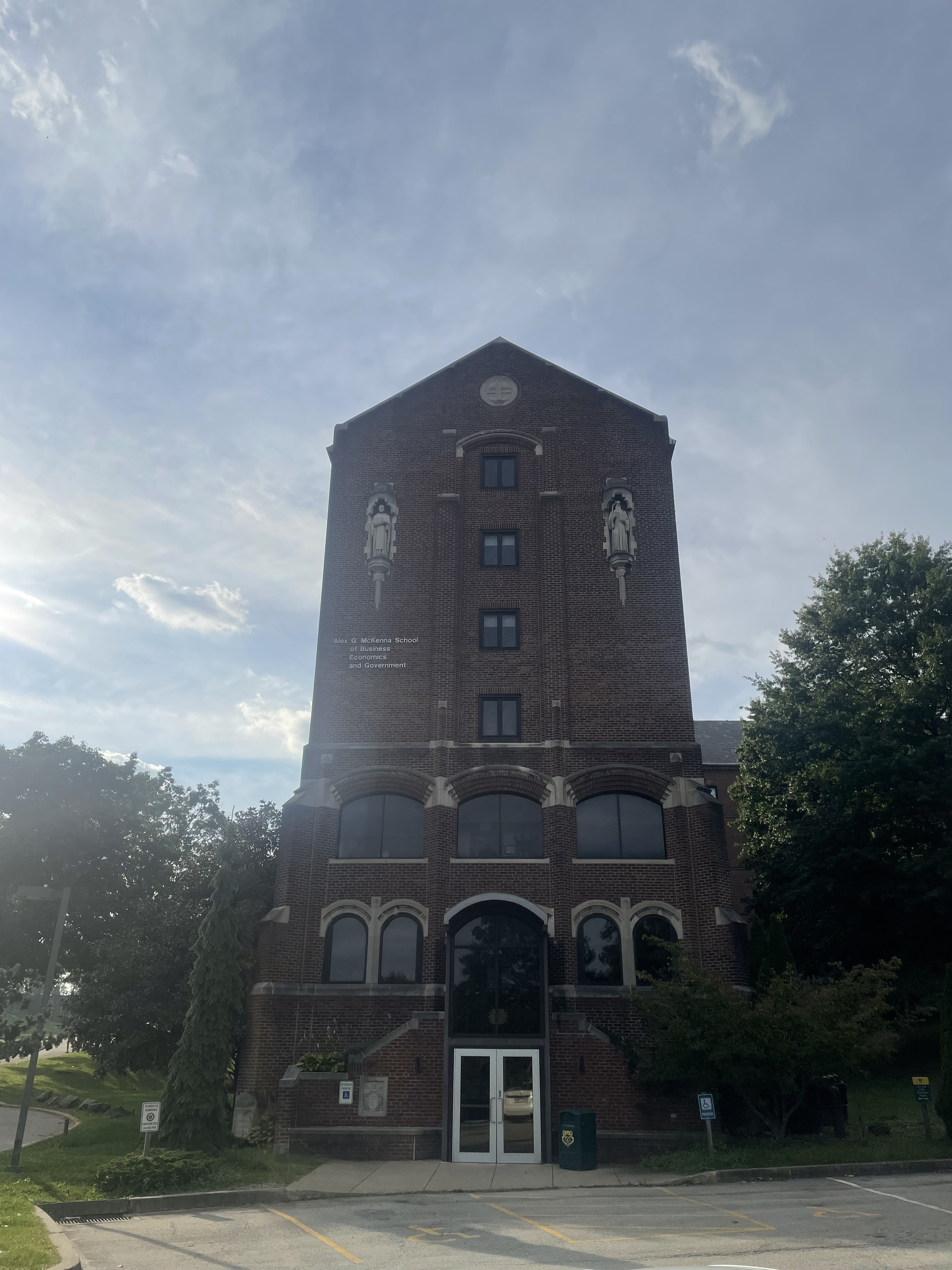
Aurelius Hall, a dormitory and classroom building at St. Vincent College, is named after Stehle.

It was under Stehle's leadership that in 1929 the archabbey took over St. Emma Agricultural and Industrial School in Bellemead, Virginia, which ministered to the African-Americans of the area.

In 1924, Pope Pius XI requested that the American-Cassinese Congregation establish an educational apostolate in China, and Aurelius responded, sending monastics to found what would become Fu Jen Catholic University. However, the debts that Stehle took on in founding the school nearly bankrupted St. Vincent, and "it was clear that the stress of responsibility for the China mission was a major cause for his death." At 10:30 PM on February 12, 1930, Stehle died. His requiem mass was celebrated by bishop Hugh Boyle of the Diocese of Pittsburgh and the sermon preached by Joseph Schrembs of the Diocese of Cleveland. Aurelius Hall, a dormitory and classroom building at St. Vincent, is named after Stehle.
