= Andrew Hintenach =

Archabbot of Saint Vincent Archabbey

Right Reverend Andrew Hintenach O.S.B.
- Second Archabbot of Saint Vincent Archabbey
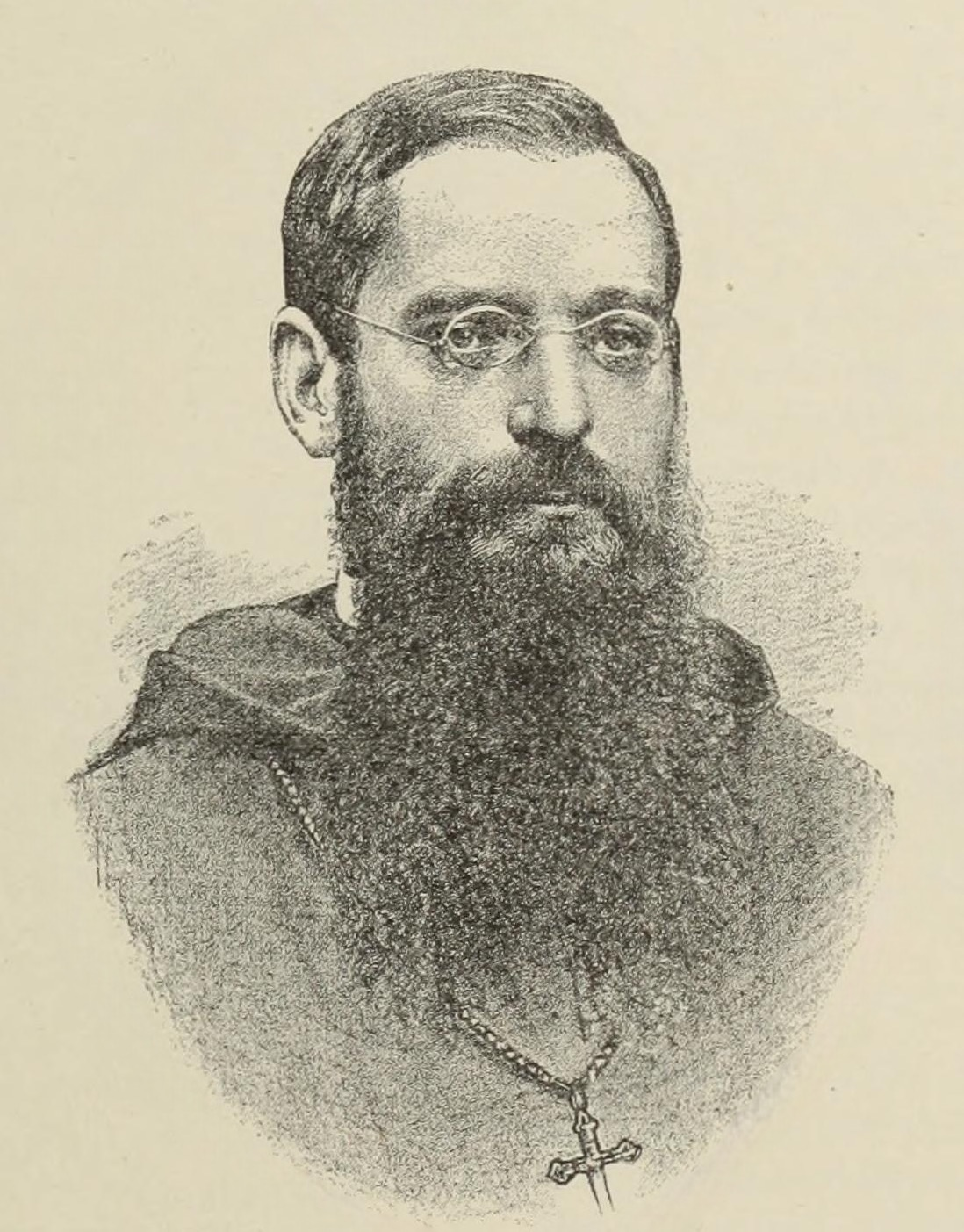
- Church: Catholic Church
- Elected: 7 February 1888
- Term ended: 25 May 1892
- Predecessor: Boniface Wimmer
- Successor: Leander Schnerr

Orders
- Ordination: 12 April 1867 by Michael Domenec

Personal details
- Born: Tobias Hintenach; May 12, 1844; Schollbrunn, Baden
- Died: 7 September 1927 (aged 83)
- Buried: St. Vincent Cemetery

Andrew Hintenach, OSB was a German-born Catholic monk who served as the second archabbot of Saint Vincent Archabbey in Latrobe, Pennsylvania from 1888 to 1892.

== Biography ==
=== Early life ===
Andrew Hintenach was born in Schollbrunn, Baden, on May 12, 1844 as Tobias Hinentach, and came to Baltimore with his parents when he was two years old. He entered Saint Vincent College at the age of 10 and became a novice at St. Vincent Abbey in 1850 at the age of sixteen, taking the religious name Andrew. He professed solemn vows on July 11, 1861, and six years later was ordained a priest by bishop Michael Domenec of Pittsburgh, offering his First Mass at St. Mary's Church in St. Marys, Pennsylvania. He taught classics and history at St. Vincent College up until 1876, when he was appointed Prior by Boniface Wimmer. Following this, he then became superior of the abbey's mission in Alabama before being elected the second abbot of the monastery on 8 February 1888.

=== Archabbacy ===
Hintenach was blessed as abbot on July 5, 1888 and shortly thereafter received the honorary title of archabbot by special indult of the Holy See.

Before his tenure as abbot, Hintenach was known to be a figure which advocated for a more strict monastic observance rather than the more apostolic focus that monastic life at St. Vincent had taken under Boniface Wimmer. This advocacy continued during his tenure, with a greater focus upon enabling the monks of the monastery to life a life of common prayer and monastic discipline, even if they were engaged in parish work.

Despite this, Hintenach also oversaw the expansion of the abbey's mission to the American Southwest, specifically New Mexico and to Native Americans there, along with the foundation of St. Bede Abbey in Illinois. He also initiated the construction of what would become St. Vincent Basilica.

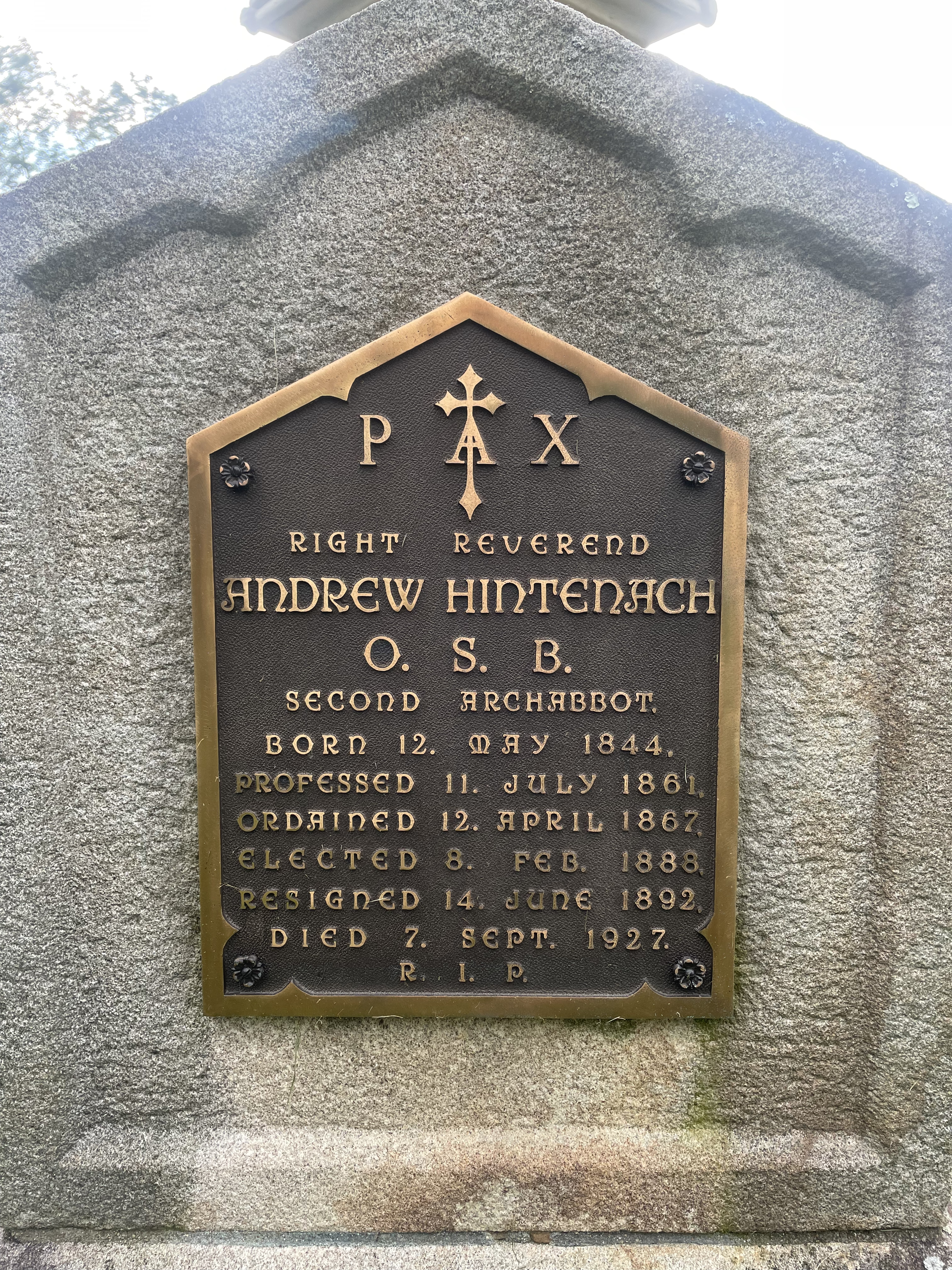
Hintenach's headstone at St. Vincent Cemetery

In 1890, Hintenach wrote to the Holy See asking to be relieved from his office, feeling inadequate with his ability to govern the religious community at St. Vincent. While his request was initially denied, his feelings persisted, and on May 25, 1892, the Sacred Congregation for the Propagation of the Faith issued a decree relieving Hintentach of abbatial office and instructing for a new election to be held. Leander Schnerr, his successor was elected on July 15, 1892.

=== Death ===
Following his resignation, Hintenach served as chaplain for the Benedictine sisters of Cañon City, Colorado, and then in Erie, Pennsylvania. He retired from active ministry in 1921, living a quiet life until his death on September 7, 1927, at the age of 83. Bishop Hugh Boyle celebrated the Requiem Mass. Andrew Hall, the building containing the monastic refectory at St. Vincent, is named after him.
