= George Zurcher =

American Catholic priest and anti-alcohol advocate

The Reverend George Zurcher
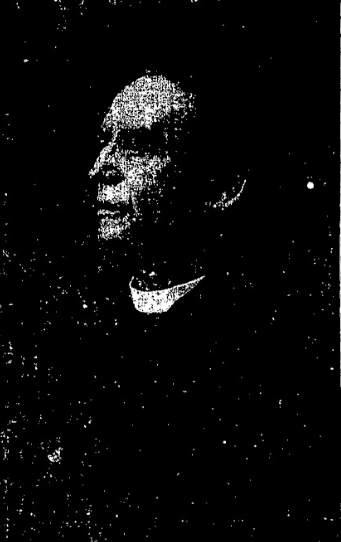
- George Zurcher from a 1911 advertisement
- Church: Roman Catholic
- Diocese: Buffalo

Personal details
- Born: December 12, 1852 Alsace, France (Note: Alsace was part of the Second French Republic when Zurcher was born in 1852, and was under the control of the German Empire when he left for America in 1873. At the time of his death in 1931, the region was back under French control. Sources refer to him as both from France and Germany.)
- Died: September 11, 1931 (aged 78) North Evans, New York, US
- Buried: Eden Center, New York, US
- Education: College and Seminary of Our Lady of Angels

Ordination history
History
Diaconal ordination
- Ordained by: Stephen V. Ryan
- Date: February 24, 1877
- Place: College and Seminary of Our Lady of Angels Chapel
Priestly ordination
- Ordained by: Stephen V. Ryan
- Date: June 11, 1877
- Place: College and Seminary of Our Lady of Angels Chapel

George Zurcher (December 12, 1852 – September 11, 1931) was an American Catholic priest and anti-alcohol advocate. He was ordained in 1877 and, except for a 6-year period when he was suspended, served as a priest for the rest of his life. He predominantly served at parishes in Western New York. While the chaplain of the poorhouse in Buffalo, Zurcher became convinced that the consumption of alcohol was an evil that should be personally avoided. From 1895 he advocated for it to be banned.

Zurcher's strong beliefs came into conflict with the Catholic Church. He was reprimanded by Bishop Stephen V. Ryan in 1895 for sending a letter to the Buffalo Times. Part of the letter incorrectly attacked Jesuits in the Diocese of Buffalo for selling beer at a Catholic parochial school. Zurcher's third book, Monks and their Decline, was placed on the Index of Forbidden Books in 1898. On All Saints Day 1899 he gave a homily critical of the practice of collecting money for souls in purgatory. This led to a six-year suspension from ministry.

In 1906, Zurcher's suspension was lifted and he returned to being a parish priest in 1907. He edited the quarterly publication Catholics and Prohibition 1909–1919, and helped found the Catholic Prohibition League of America out of frustration with the Catholic Total Abstinence Union of America in 1914. He died on September 11, 1931, and was buried in Eden Center, New York.

== Early life ==
George Zurcher was born in Alsace on December 12, 1852, to John A. Zurcher and Rosalie Welterlin Zurcher. He entered the seminary in Aachen, but did not complete his studies, instead immigrating to the United States in 1873. Zurcher settled in Western New York, attending The College and Seminary of Our Lady of Angels, now Niagara University, to finish his degree in theology. Zurcher was ordained on June 11, 1877, by Stephen V. Ryan, Bishop of Buffalo, at the seminary chapel, and was assigned to a parish in Boston, New York. Subsequently, he served as a parish priest in Limestone, New York and Cohocton, New York.

== Anti-alcohol advocacy ==
=== Temperance advocacy (to 1895) ===
Zurcher advocacy for temperance came from serving for 15 years as the chaplain of the poorhouse in Buffalo while assigned to a nearby St. Joseph's parish. James E Brady writes in the Catholic University of America Press that interacting with the destitute and attending court "convinced [Zurcher] that alcohol was a curse and the root cause of all the social problems of the era." In 1890, Zurcher self-published his first temperance book, Handcuffs For Alcoholism, describing the effects of alcoholism on the body and on society. At the 1893 Catholic Total Abstinence Union of America convention, Zurcher gave a speech denouncing the practice of German-American catholic parishes circumventing the Third Plenary Council of Baltimore's prohibition of the church selling alcohol at church functions.

=== Prohibition advocacy and suspension from ministry (1895—1906) ===
In 1895, Zurcher transitioned from advocacy for temperance to advocacy for the total prohibition on alcohol due to the lack of enforcement of the Third Plenary Council of Baltimore. In December he was censured by Stephen V. Ryan, second Bishop of Buffalo, for sending a letter to the Buffalo Times that attacked Jesuits in the Diocese of Buffalo claiming that they "owe more obedience to the Superior-General in Europe then to Bishop Ryan" and incorrectly asserting that beer was sold at a Jesuit school.

His second book, Foreign Ideas in the Catholic Church in America, was released the next year. Zurcher argues in the book that Germans have had a negative influence on the Catholic Church in the United States. In particular, he focuses on Saint Vincent Archabbey which, at the time, brewed Saint Vincent Beer. Zurcher also argues that Catholics should be allowed to join the Protestant Sons of Temperance because "the future of the church in many cities is in doubt" if Catholic and Protestants do not work together to end the consumption of alcohol. Colman James Barry, a Benedictine priest and historian of the Catholic Church, criticizes Foreign Ideas as an "intemperate pamphlet" that focuses on the "Germans and their supposed efforts to divide the Church in the United States".

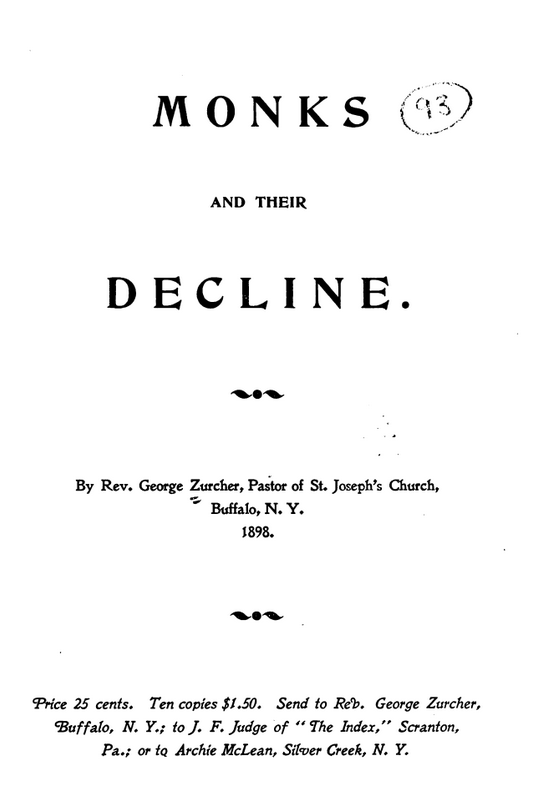
Title page of Monks and their Decline which was placed on the Index of Forbidden Books in 1898

Zurcher released his third book, Monks and their Decline, in 1898. In it, he criticizes Saint Vincent Archabbey for brewing beer, chided it for not joining the temperance movement and claimed the monks were contributing to the drunkenness of lay Catholics. He also mocked the post-nominal letters of Benedictines, OSB, suggesting that they should stand for "the Order of Sacred Brewers". The book was placed on the Index of Forbidden Books by the Sacred Congregation of the Index on September 5. On December 31, Zurcher accepted the decision of the Sacred Congregation of the Index, withdrew the book from circulation, and promised to refund the purchase price.

On January 4, 1899, Zurcher withdrew from anti-alcohol advocacy due to restrictions placed upon him by James Edward Quigley, third Bishop of Buffalo. In November, Zurcher preached a homily attacking the church for collecting money on All Saints Day for souls in purgatory. Instead of retracting the homily as commanded by the Vicar-General of the dioceses, Zurcher nailed a copy of it to the pulpit. Zurcher was suspended from ministry by Quigley in January 1900. While suspended, he returned to anti-alcohol advocacy and unsuccessfully ran for New York State Senate on the Prohibition Party ticket. In 1905, Zurcher released his fourth book, The Apple of Discord: Or, Temporal Power in the Catholic Church, arguing that the Catholic Church should cease the practice of censorship within the church and limit itself to a spiritual role in the world.

=== Reinstatement and later advocacy (1906–1931) ===
Zurcher was reinstated as a priest by Charles H. Colton, fourth Bishop of Buffalo, in January 1906. For his first year after reinstatement, Zurcher was the chaplain of a Sisters of Mercy convent in Buffalo. Subsequently, for the rest of his life, he served as parish priest in Niagara Falls, New York, East Aurora, New York, and then North Evans, New York.

In 1914, due to a lack of radicalism in the Catholic Total Abstinence Union of America, Zurcher left the organization and helped found the Catholic Prohibition League of America. In 1918, he helped found the National Dry Federation. He edited the quarterly periodical Catholics and Prohibition between 1909 and 1919. When the Eighteenth Amendment to the United States Constitution was ratified in 1919, Zurcher ended the publication because "the liquor problem had finally been settled once and for all". The same year he founded the Catholic Clergy Prohibition League of America. He supported the National United Committee for Law Enforcement during the prohibition era which contended that a lack of enforcement was the problem, not prohibition itself.

== Death and legacy ==
George Zurcher died on September 11, 1931, after a long illness. He was buried at Eden Cemetery in Eden Center, New York, on September 14, 1931, after a Requiem Mass celebrated by Herman Gerlach.

A cenotaph was erected in Zurcher's memory in 1935 by Protestant temperance groups in North Evans, New York, the location of his final parish. Historian John F. Quinn considered Zurcher to be "probably the most militant Catholic prohibitionist priest of the time".

== Bibliography ==
Books

- Handcuffs For Alcoholism (1890)
- Foreign Ideas in the Catholic Church in America (1896)
- Monks and their Decline (1898)
- The Apple of Discord: Or, Temporal Power in the Catholic Church (1905)

Periodicals

- Catholics and Prohibition (quarterly 1909–1919)

== Electoral history ==
1900, New York state senate, 49th District
Party	Candidate	Votes	%
Republican	George A. Davis	17,143	
Democratic	George Staub	13,530	
Socialist Labor	Theodore A. Venneman	(Note: Not reported)	
Prohibition	George Zurcher		
