= 2015 Tonsa bombing =

2015 Islamist terror attack Punjab, Pakistan

- Part of War in North-West Pakistan
- Location of Punjab in Pakistan
- Location: Tonsa, Punjab, Pakistan
- Date: 14 October 2015
- Attack type: Suicide attack
- Deaths: 7
- Injuries: 13
- Perpetrator: Tehrik-i-Taliban Pakistan: Jamaat-ul-Ahrar

On 14 October 2015, a suicide bombing killed at least 7 people and injured thirteen others in Tonsa, Punjab, Pakistan. The attack took place inside the political office of Pakistan Muslim League – Nawaz (PML–N) MNA Sardar Amjad Farooq Khan Khosa, who was not present. Sardar Khosa, who was attending a meeting in Islamabad, said he did not receive any threat or alert prior to the blast. A Tehrik-i-Taliban Pakistan splinter group, Jamaat-ul-Ahrar, claimed responsibility for the attack.

== See also ==
- List of terrorist incidents, 2015
- Terrorist incidents in Pakistan in 2015
