= First Mass =

First Holy Mass celebrated by a newly ordained priest as the main celebrant

The term First Mass refers to two distinct but related contexts within Christian liturgical practice:

1. Historical First Mass: The inaugural celebration of the Eucharist in a specific location.
2. Personal First Mass: The initial Mass celebrated by a newly ordained priest.

== Historical First Mass ==
The historical usage of "First Mass" denotes the first occasion the Eucharist is celebrated in a particular place. A prominent example is the first documented Catholic Mass in the Philippines, held on March 31, 1521 (Easter Sunday). This Mass was conducted by Father Pedro de Valderrama, the chaplain of Ferdinand Magellan's expedition, on the island of Limasawa in Southern Leyte. This event is considered the introduction of Christianity to the Philippines.

The exact location of this first Mass has been subject to historical debate. While Limasawa is widely recognized as the site, some scholars have argued for Butuan as the actual location. However, the National Historical Commission of the Philippines reaffirmed Limasawa's status in 2020 after reviewing historical evidence.

== Personal First Mass ==
In the Catholic Church, the term "First Mass" also refers to the first Eucharistic celebration presided over by a newly ordained priest. This event is significant in the life of the priest and the community. According to Catholic tradition, a plenary indulgence is granted to the priest on the occasion of his first Mass celebrated with some solemnity, and to the faithful who devoutly assist at the same Mass.

Additionally, the newly ordained priest is granted the privilege to impart a special papal blessing, known as the "Solemn Pontifical Blessing," during his first Mass. This blessing signifies the closeness of the ordinand to the Pope and carries the same spiritual benefits as the Pope's own blessing.

It is customary for the newly ordained priest to give his first blessings to his parents, family members, and others present. This practice underscores the communal and familial aspects of the priest's new ministry.

== Usage in Other Christian Traditions ==
=== Anglican Communion ===
Within the Anglican Communion, particularly among Anglo-Catholics, the term "First Mass" is used similarly to denote the first Eucharistic celebration by a newly ordained priest. The liturgical practices and theological significance closely mirror those of the Roman Catholic tradition.

=== Church of Sweden ===
In the Church of Sweden, a Lutheran denomination, the Latin term Prima Missa is used to describe the first Mass celebrated by a newly ordained priest. The Church of Sweden maintains a high liturgical tradition, and the first Mass is considered a significant milestone in a priest's ministry. The Swedish Church Order of 1571, which remains influential, reflects the church's Catholic heritage and liturgical conservatism.
