= Frank E. Resnik =

Former CEO of Phillip Morris USA

Frank E. Resnik (October 14, 1928 – April 17, 1995) was CEO (1984–1989) and Chairman (1989–1991) of Philip Morris USA.

== Formative years ==
Resnik was born in Pleasant Unity, Pennsylvania on October 14, 1928. After graduating from high school, he joined the United States Army where he became an instructor and first field sergeant. After his service in the Army, Resnik attended Saint Vincent College in Latrobe, Pennsylvania, on a football scholarship. He graduated with a degree in chemistry in 1952 and later earned a master's degree in chemistry from the University of Richmond in Richmond, Virginia.

== Professional life ==
Resnik began his career as a research chemist with Philip Morris in Richmond, Virginia during the 1950s. In 1980, he was named executive vice president of Philip Morris' Tobacco Technology Group.

In 1984, he was named president and CEO of Philip Morris USA. In 1989, he became chairman of that same company. In 1988, he received the Horatio Alger Award. During his career in the tobacco industry, Resnik contributed thirty articles to scientific literature.

In January 1991, after thirty-eight years with Philip Morris, Resnik retired and moved to Jupiter, Florida.

== Death and interment ==
Resnik died on April 17, 1995 in West Palm Beach, Florida, and was buried in St. Vincent Cemetery, Unity Township, Westmoreland County, Pennsylvania.
