= Saint Vincent Archabbey Gristmill =

- St. Vincent Archabbey Gristmill
- U.S. National Register of Historic Places
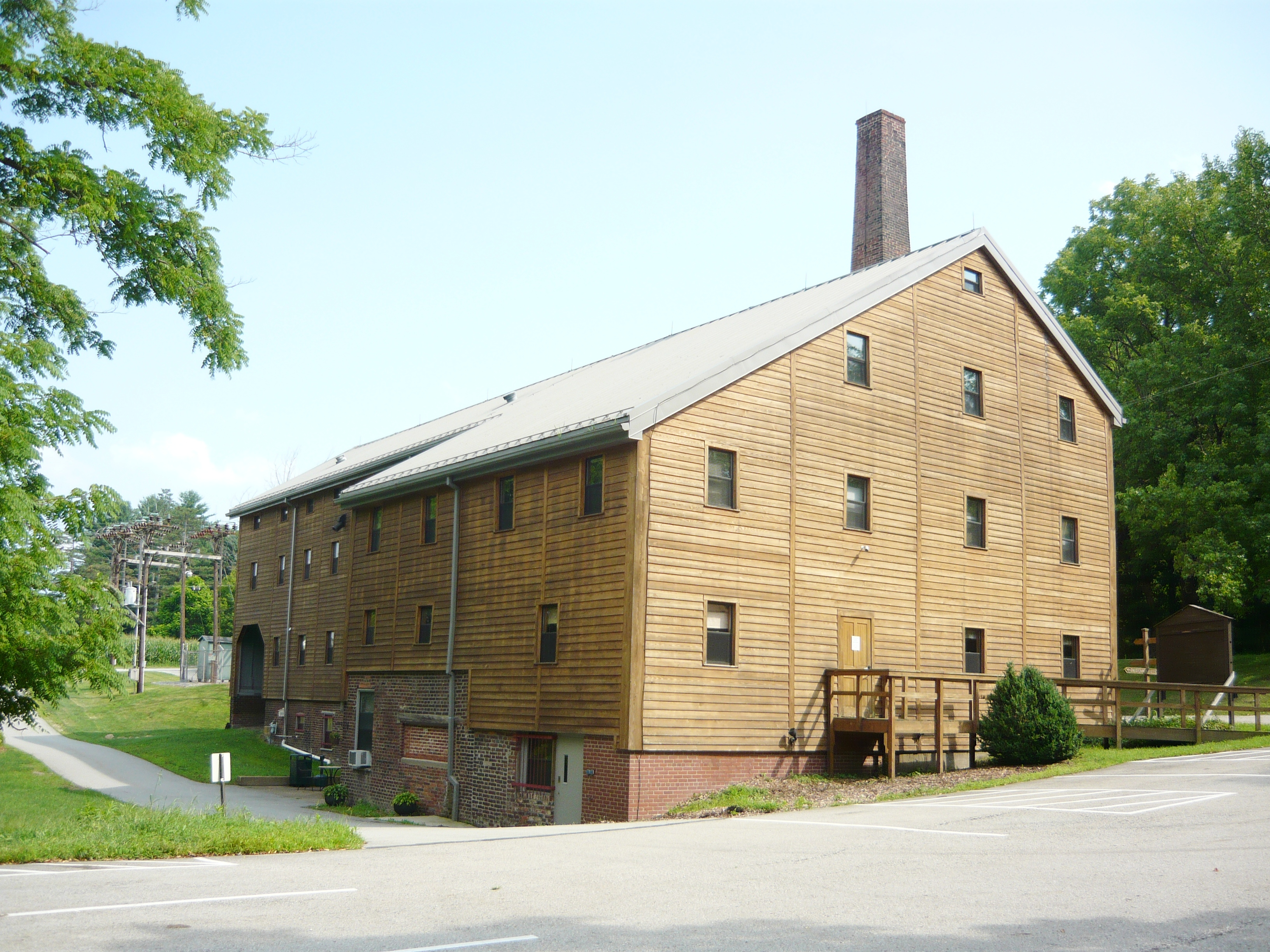
- St. Vincent Archabbey Gristmill

- Location within Pennsylvania Location within the United States
- Location: Unity Township, Pennsylvania
- Coordinates: 40°17′44″N 79°24′10″W
- Area: 1 acre (0.40 ha)
- Built: 1854, 1883
- Built by: Benedictine Monks
- NRHP reference No.: 78002486
- Added to NRHP: January 18, 1978

St. Vincent Archabbey Gristmill, also known as The Gristmill, is a historic grist mill located in Unity Township, Westmoreland County, Pennsylvania. The original section was built in 1854, and is a four-story, frame structure measuring 45 by 40 feet (14 m × 12 m). A 45-by-45-foot (14 m × 14 m) addition was built in 1883. The mill operated by steam and remains in use. It was built as part of Saint Vincent Archabbey, the first Benedictine Monastery in the United States, which opened in 1846.

It was added to the National Register of Historic Places in 1978.

== History ==
=== Site and planning ===
On April 16, 1790, Theodore Browers, a catholic priest and founder of the parish that would become Saint Vincent Basilica, purchased a 300-acre (120 ha) plot of land between Four Mile Run and Beaty Road. The "Sportsman's Hall Tract", as it came to be known, was gifted to Boniface Wimmer and a group of novices on October 18, 1846 to found Saint Vincent Archabbey. To achieve the goal of a self-sufficient community, the monks built buildings and cleared land to farm. The grain the monks grew needed to be ground into flour to make bread, so, in 1850, Wimmer purchased four millstones from France with the goal of adding a gristmill to the archabbey. Three years later, Wimmer sent Peter Seemueller, a lay brother, to "learn first hand the grinding mechanism".

=== Construction ===
In December 1854, the monks finished a 45 by 35 feet (14 m × 11 m) three-floor wooden structure to house the gristmill. Wood for the beams, planks, and siding was sourced from a plot of land on Chestnut Ridge purchased by Wimmer in 1851. Each beam was numbered in the plans and marked at the sawmill with a roman numeral on one end. Sandstone for the foundation and brick for the chimney came from the archabbey grounds. In all, the building cost the monks $3,000 (equivalent to $107,500 in 2025).

By the end of the next year, a 40 by 51 feet (12 m × 16 m) one-story addition was added to the west side of the gristmill to house a sawmill. The sawmill would receive a second and third-story in subsequent years to bring it to the height of the grist mill. In 1883, the complex received a final 40 by 35 feet (12 m × 11 m) addition to the east side of the gristmill for grain storage.
