= Thalmassing =

- Municipality
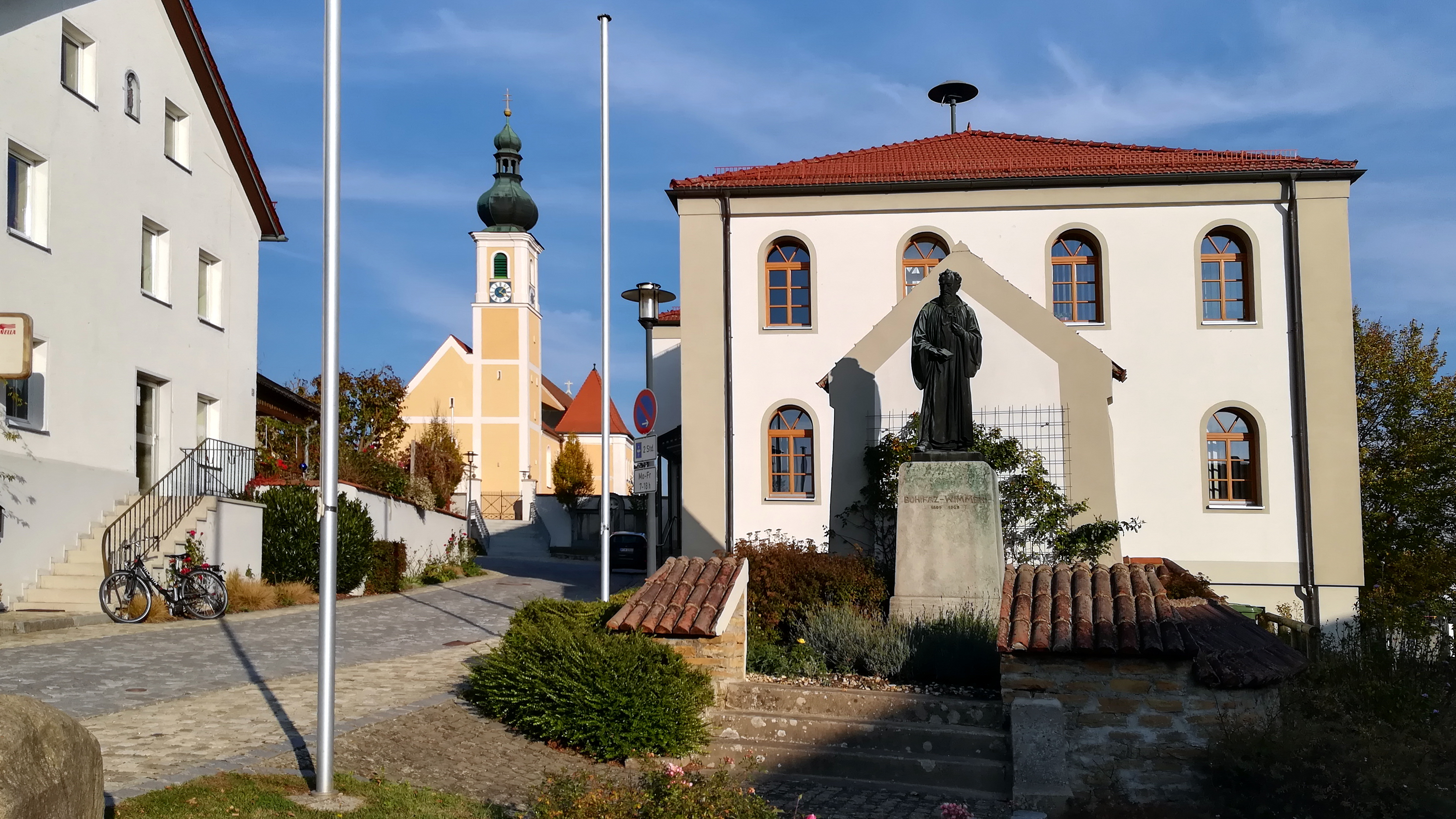
- Town hall and the Church of Saint Nicholas

- Coat of arms

- Location of Thalmassing within Regensburg district
- Interactive map of Thalmassing
- Location within Germany Location within Bavaria
- Coordinates: 48°54′53″N 12°09′11″E
- Country: Germany
- State: Bavaria
- Admin. region: Oberpfalz
- District: Regensburg
- Subdivisions: 7 Ortsteile

Government
  - Mayor (2020–26): Raffael Parzefall

Area
  - Total: 37.11 km^{2} (14.33 sq mi)
- Elevation: 360 m (1,180 ft)

Population (2025-12-31)
  - Total: 3,570
  - Density: 96.2/km^{2} (249/sq mi)
- Time zone: UTC+01:00 (CET)
  - Summer (DST): UTC+02:00 (CEST)
- Postal codes: 93107
- Dialling codes: 09453
- Vehicle registration: R
- Website: www.thalmassing.de

Thalmassing is a municipality in the district of Regensburg in Bavaria in Germany.
