= Boniface Wimmer =

Founder of first American Benedictine monastery (1809–1887)

Right Reverend Boniface Wimmer O.S.B.
- Archabbot of Saint Vincent Archabbey
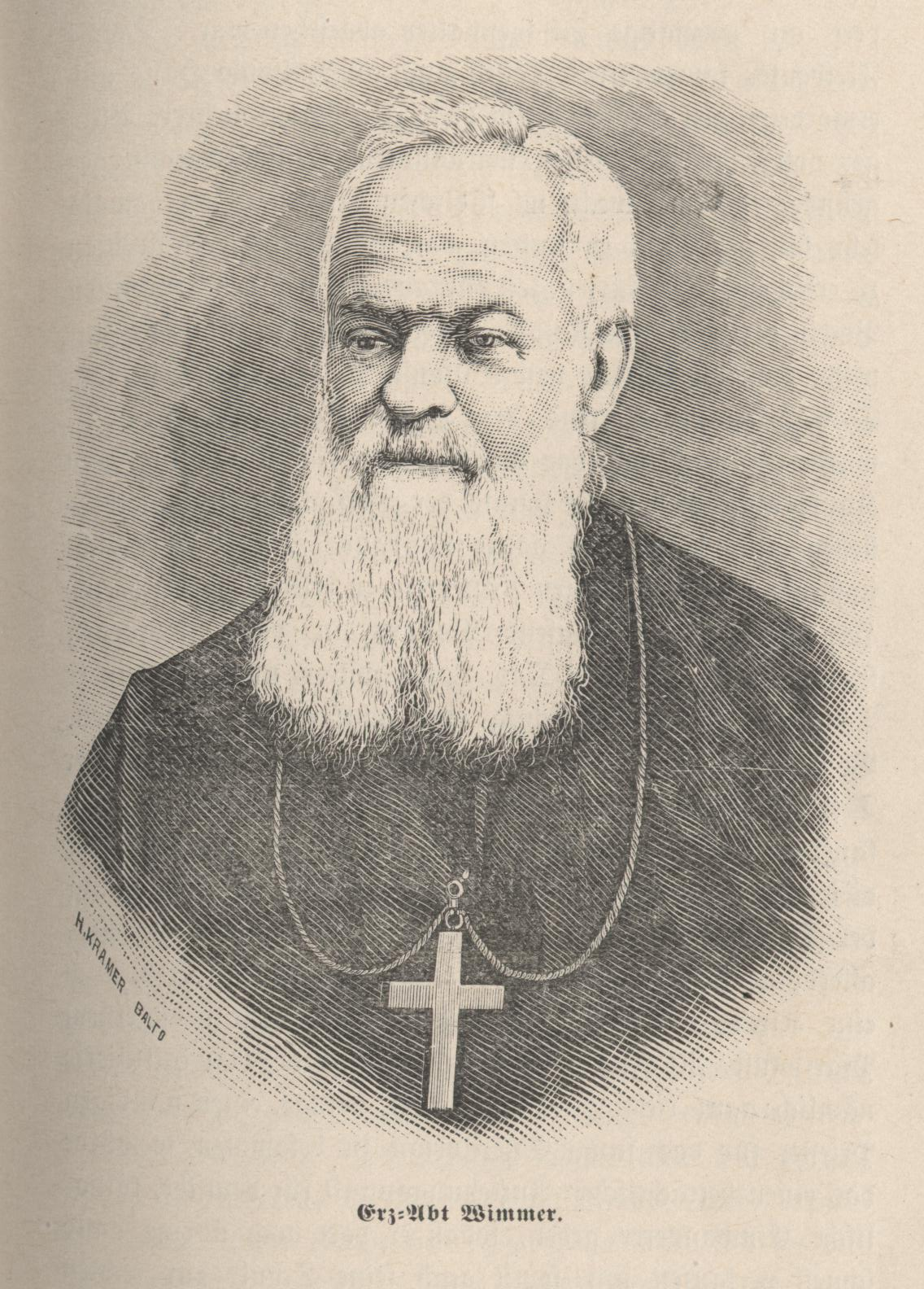
- Church: Catholic
- Appointed: 1851
- Successor: Andrew Hintenach

Orders
- Ordination: August 1, 1831

Personal details
- Born: January 14, 1809 Thalmassing, Kingdom of Bavaria
- Died: December 8, 1887 (aged 78) Latrobe, Pennsylvania, US
- Buried: Saint Vincent Cemetery
- Denomination: Catholic
- Education: Pontifical Gregorian University
- Motto: In Hoc Signo Vinces
- Coat of arms

Boniface Wimmer (1809–1887) was a German Catholic prelate who in 1846 founded the first Benedictine monastery in the United States, Saint Vincent Archabbey in Latrobe, Pennsylvania. The abbey was officially recognized in 1855, when Wimmer also founded the American-Cassinese Congregation of Benedictine Confederation. He served as abbot of Saint Vincent's from 1855 to 1883, and as archabbot from 1883 until his death in 1887.

== Early life ==
Wimmer was born January 14, 1809, in the hamlet of Thalmassing, Bavaria, Germany, and christened Sebastian Wimmer. His parents, Peter Wimmer and Elizabeth (née Lang) Wimmer were tavern keepers.

Sebastian believed he had a vocation to the priesthood from a young age. He studied law at the University of Regensburg (Ratisbon) and the Ludwig-Maximilians-Universität München. He finished his theological studies at the Gregorianum after he won a competitive exam for a scholarship. Wimmer was ordained a priest on August 1, 1831.

== Vocation ==
Following his ordination to the priesthood, Sebastian Wimmer served a year as curate at the Shrine of Our Lady of Altötting in Bavaria. It was also during this time that the King of Bavaria, Ludwig of the Royal House of Wittelsbach, began re-establishing the Bavarian Benedictine Monasteries that had been suppressed by Napoleon. One was the Benedictine foundation of Saint Michael Abbey in the town of Metten, Bavaria. Saint Michael Abbey, founded in 766 by Charlemagne with monks from the Archcenobium of Monte Cassino of the Italian province of Umbria, had been suppressed in 1803 by Napoleon. With its re-establishment, Wimmer sought to enter the newly formed monastery and discern a vocation to the Benedictine monastic life.

Upon entering the community at Metten, Wimmer was given the religious name, Boniface, after the great Apostle to Germany, Saint Boniface. He took solemn vows of obedience, stability and Conversatio Morum (conversion of life) on December 29, 1833. He was sent to teach at the Benedictine College of St. Stephen's in Augsburg, also newly established by Ludwig I of Bavaria.

In 1842 as a professor at the Ludwig-Maximilians-Universität München, he saw first-hand the early emigration to the United States.

Wimmer felt that he had an interior calling to be a missionary to those German people who had left their native land to pursue a better life in the United States. After reading about the condition of German immigrants in the United States, Wimmer took steps to transplant Benedictine missions there. He began by asking his superior for permission to go to the New World as a missionary. In 1846, he was granted permission to serve in a missionary capacity in the United States.

== Evangelism ==
Between 1830 and 1860, the majority of the 1.5 million German immigrants to the United States settled on the rural frontier. Wimmer came to serve these working-class Catholic immigrants, and for the next forty years, his evangelization efforts expanded to include Irish, African Americans, Native Americans, and immigrants from Eastern Europe. Thus he demonstrated a traditional Benedictine preference to establish monasteries and religious centers in farming regions and to work in rural areas rather than urban.

== Missionary ==
Wimmer and a band of 18 young aspirants to the Benedictine life left Rotterdam, the Netherlands in July 1846. The passage across the Atlantic Ocean on the steamship, U.S. Iowa, was turbulent. Upon his arrival in New York City, Wimmer was greeted with discouragement by several priests who tried to persuade him to abandon his plans.

Nevertheless, he went west to the newly organized Diocese of Pittsburgh, and accepted land which Father Peter Lemke, for years associated with the Rev. Prince Gallitzin, had offered. Conditions at this site in Carrolltown proved unfavorable. By late September 1846, Wimmer had received an invitation from Michael O'Connor, the first Bishop of Pittsburgh, asking him to take the pastoral responsibility of a small parish named Saint Vincent, about 40 miles southeast of Pittsburgh. Wimmer and his companions arrived at Saint Vincent on October 19, 1846. There they found only a small school house, a barn, a log cabin, and a small brick church. It was here that on October 24, 1846, Father Boniface Wimmer, O.S.B., was installed as pastor of Saint Vincent Parish and founded the first Benedictine Monastery in the United States.

By 1851, there were 100 professed monks at Saint Vincent. On August 24, 1855, Pope Pius IX, in his Apostolic Brief, Inter Ceteras, elevated Saint Vincent to the status of Abbey. Within the nine years of his arrival in the United States, Wimmer had built up a strong monastic foundation with over 200 professed monks. Wimmer became Abbot in 1855, and in 1883, was granted the title, Archabbot, by Pope Leo XIII, as well as the privilege of wearing the cappa magna. Abbot Wimmer was an active monk, rather than a contemplative. In addition to building up Saint Vincent, he developed a self-sufficient community that ground its own flour, raised its own crops, mined its own coal, and brewed its own beer.

== Later years ==
Boniface Wimmer died at St. Vincent's Abbey in Latrobe on December 8, 1887, and was succeeded as archabbot by Andrew Hintenach. At the time of his death, there were ten Benedictine Abbeys in the United States founded by him. In his lifetime, he founded 152 Catholic parishes, ten Abbeys and numerous schools. He was lauded by Sadliers Catholic Encyclopedia of 1888, as "The greatest American Missionary of the Nineteenth century. Today, there are over thirty Abbeys and monasteries that take their roots from Archabbot Boniface Wimmer, O.S.B."

His funeral services took place over a period of several days and were attended by many prominent religious figures and civic leaders from across the United States, as well as his current and former students. According to The Latrobe Advance, "The body of the Arch-Abbott lay in state in full pontifical robes in the apartments used by him during life until Sunday afternoon," December 11. That day, his body was carried to his church, where it "remained until the grand and impressive ceremonies preparatory to [it] being placed in the vault, [its] last resting place, were gone through with" on Tuesday, December 13. His former church "was filled to overflowing" during his funeral. "The Rt. Rev. K. Phelan, of Allegheny, was the celebrant of the solemn requiem, and Bishop William O'Hara, of Scranton, delivered a masterly sermon."

His nephew Sebastian Wimmer was a well-known Civil engineer who lived in St. Marys Pennsylvania. Sebastian kept a diary of his life daily for fifty years. The original diaries are at the St. Mary's historical society and were transcribed five years ago by Laura Woodrough Steneck.

== Quotations ==
"Forward, always forward, everywhere forward! We must not be held back by debts, bad years or by difficulties of the times. Man's adversity is God's opportunity."—Archabbot Boniface Wimmer, O.S.B.

"We belong to the whole world."—Archabbot Boniface Wimmer, O.S.B.

"People plant trees though they are certain that the fruit will benefit only the next generation."—Archabbot Boniface Wimmer, O.S.B.

== Sources ==
- Oetgen, Jerome (1997). An American Abbot: Boniface Wimmer, O.S.B., 1809-1887. Washington: Catholic University of America Press. ISBN 0-8132-0893-9.
- "Boniface Wimmer" by Patrick W. Carey in American National Biography. New York: Oxford University Press, 1999.
