= American-Cassinese Benedictine Congregation =

Association of Benedictine monasteries

American-Cassinese Congregation
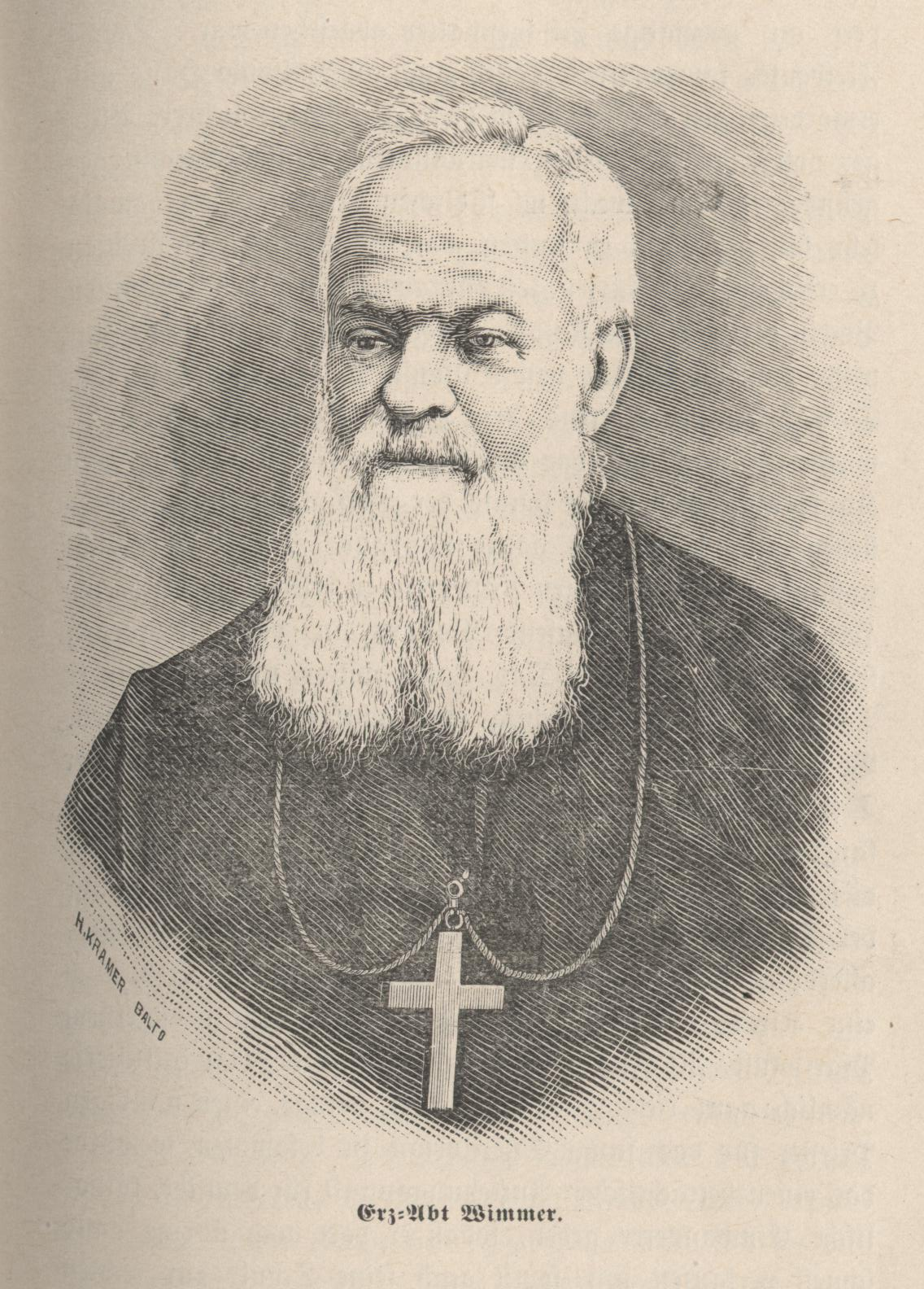
- Abbot Boniface Wimmer, O.S.B. (1809-1877)
- Abbreviation: Post-nominal letters: O.S.B.
- Nickname: Benedictines
- Formation: 24 August 1855; 171 years ago
- Founders: Abbot Boniface Wimmer, O.S.B.
- Founded at: Saint Vincent Archabbey
- Type: Benedictine Congregation
- Region served: United States, Brazil, Canada, Colombia, Mexico, Taiwan
- Members: 608 monks as of 2020
- Abbot President: Abbot Jonathan Licari, O.S.B.
- Affiliations: Roman Catholic Church Benedictine Confederation
- Website: Official website

The American-Cassinese Congregation is a Catholic association of Benedictine monasteries founded in 1855. The monasteries of the congregation follow the monastic way of life as outlined by St. Benedict of Nursia in his early 6th century Rule of Saint Benedict. The congregation is one of 19 congregations in the Benedictine Confederation and includes 25 monasteries: 19 autonomous abbeys and 6 dependent priories, located across 15 states and Puerto Rico, as well as Brazil, Canada, Colombia, Mexico, and Taiwan.

== History ==
In the eighteenth and early nineteenth centuries there was a general secularization and suppression of monasteries throughout Europe: "by 1810 fewer than thirty of the estimated 1500 European Benedictine monasteries that existed in the previous century remained." Slowly, there arose a Benedictine revival that saw old monasteries re-founded, new monasteries founded, and a missionary impulse that began to spread monasticism across the world. Autonomous monasteries began to join in collaborative efforts that would see the creation of "congregations" such as the French Solesmes Congregation in 1837, the Beuronese Congregation in 1868, the Subiaco Congregation in 1872, and the Swiss-American Congregation in 1881. It was in the midst of this revival that Abbot Boniface Wimmer, founder of Saint Vincent Archabbey in Latrobe, Pennsylvania, created the American-Cassinese congregation. Pope Pius IX erected the congregation with the decree Inter ceteras on 24 August 1855, placing the congregation under the patronage of the Holy Guardian Angels.

The American-Cassinese Congregation was the first Benedictine congregation to be established in North America, and after only a quarter-century of existence, had become the largest Benedictine congregation in the world.

== Presidents of the Congregation ==
These are the presidents of the congregation in order of election and years served:

1. Boniface Wimmer (1855-1887)
2. Alexius Edelbrock (1888-1890)
3. Leo Haid (1890-1896)
4. Innocent Wolf (1896-1902)
5. Peter Engel (1902-1914)
6. Ernest Helmstefter (1914-1932)
7. Alcuin Deutsch (1932-1944)
8. Mark Braun (1944-1953)
9. Denis Strittmatter (1953-1965)
10. Baldwin Dworschak (1965-1971)
11. Martin Burne (1971-1983)
12. John Eidenschink (1983-1989)
13. Melvin Valvano (1989-2001)
14. Timothy Kelly (2001-2010)
15. Hugh Anderson (2010-2016)
16. Elias R. Lorenzo (2016-2020)
17. John Klassen (2020-2022)
18. Jonathan Licari, OSB (2022–present)

== Monasteries in the Congregation ==
Monks from Metten Abbey in Bavaria founded St. Vincent Archabbey in Latrobe, Pennsylvania in 1846. Most, but not all, of the other monasteries in the American-Cassinese Congregation can trace their lineage back to Metten Abbey.

There are currently twenty-five monasteries in the American-Cassinese Congregation. In the list below, monasteries in bold are current monasteries, while monasteries in italics are houses which were once part of the congregation but are not longer in existence.

- **St. Vincent Archabbey** (Latrobe, Pennsylvania): founded in 1846; became an abbey in 1855; raised to the rank of an Archabbey in 1892. Located in the Diocese of Greensburg.
  - Holy Spirit Priory (Bahia de Caraquez, Ecuador): founded in 1888, suppressed in 1889.
  - **Benedictine Priory** (Savannah, Georgia): founded in 1902; became a conventual priory in 1961; became dependent on St. Vincent Archabbey in 1967. Located in the Diocese of Savannah.
  - Mosteiro de São Bento (Vinhedo, Brazil): founded in 1950, became a conventual priory of the Brazilian Congregation in 1925; became dependent on St. Vincent Archabbey in 1964. Located in the Archdiocese of Campinas.
  - Wimmer Priory (New Taipei, Republic of China): founded in 1964. Located in the Archdiocese of Taipei.
- **St. John's Abbey** (Collegeville, Minnesota): founded in 1856; became an abbey in 1866. Originally named St. Louis on the Lake Abbey. Located in the Diocese of St. Cloud under the patronage of St. John the Baptist.
  - Saint Augustine Monastery (Nassau, Bahamas): founded in 1947; suppressed in 2005.
  - Trinity Benedictine Monastery (Fujimi, Japan): founded in 1999; closed in 2016.
- **St. Benedict's Abbey** (Atchison, Kansas): founded in 1857; became an abbey in 1876. Located in the Archdiocese of Kansas City in Kansas.
  - Mosteiro São Jose (Mineiros, Goias, Brazil): founded in 1962.
  - St. Malachy's Priory (Creston, Iowa): founded in 1871 as a parish and monastic community for Irish-Americans. Suppressed as an independent priory in 1893 due to lack of vocations.
- St. Mary's Abbey (Morristown, New Jersey): founded in Newark, New Jersey in 1857; became an abbey in 1884. Abbey transferred to Morristown, New Jersey in 1956. Located in the Diocese of Paterson.
- **Newark Abbey** (Newark, New Jersey): founded in Newark, New Jersey in 1857; shared a common history with St. Mary's Abbey until 1968, when the monastic community remaining in Newark became independent, now known as Newark Abbey. Located in the Archdiocese of Newark under the patronage of the Immaculate Conception
  - St. Mark's Priory (Kentucky)
  - St. Maur Priory (Indianapolis, Indiana): founded by St. John's Abbey in 1947; transferred to Newark Abbey in 1990; suppressed in 2004.
- **St. Gregory Abbey** (Shawnee, Oklahoma): founded in Sacred Heart, Oklahoma in 1876; became an abbey in 1896; joined American-Cassinese Congregation in 1924; abbey transferred to Shawnee, Oklahoma in 1929. Located in the Archdiocese of Oklahoma City.
- **Mary Help of Christians Abbey aka Belmont Abbey** (Belmont, North Carolina): founded in 1876; became an abbey in 1884 (then known as Maryhelp Abbey); became an abbey nullius in 1910; incorporated in the Diocese of Charlotte in 1977.
- St. Procopius Abbey (Lisle, Illinois): founded in Chicago, Illinois in 1885 as a parish and community for Czech-Americans; became an abbey in 1894; transferred abbey to Lisle, Illinois in 1914. Located in the Diocese of Joliet.
  - (**Holy Trinity Priory** (1948; indep. monastery, 1955) Butler, Pennsylvania - sui juris, 1 October 2006)
  - Benedictine Priory (Chiayi, Taiwan, RC): founded in 1966.
- Holy Cross Abbey (Cañon City, Colorado): founded in 1886 as St. Leander's; transferred from Pueblo, Colorado to Canon City in 1923; name changed to Holy Cross in 1924; became an abbey in 1925; dissolved in 2005.
- Saint Anselm Abbey (Manchester, New Hampshire): founded in 1889; became an abbey in 1927. Located in the Diocese of Manchester.
  - Woodside Priory (Portola Valley, California): founded in 1957; became dependent of Saint Anselm Abbey in 1976. Located in the Archdiocese of San Francisco under the patronage of Saint Stephen of Hungary.
- **Saint Leo Abbey** (St. Leo, Florida): founded in 1889; became an abbey in 1902. Located in the Diocese of St. Petersburg.
- St. Bernard Abbey (Cullman, Alabama): founded in 1891 as a consolidation of various Benedictine missions in Alabama. Located in the Diocese of Birmingham in Alabama.
- St. Bede Abbey (Peru, Illinois): founded in 1891, became an abbey in 1910. Located in the Diocese of Peoria.
- **St. Peter's Abbey** (Muenster, Saskatchewan): founded in 1892 in Wetaug, Illinois under the name Cluny Priory; transferred to Muenster, Saskatchewan in 1903; became an abbey in 1911; made abbey nullius from 1921 until 1998. Located in Diocese of Saskatoon.
- **Assumption Abbey** (Richardton, North Dakota): founded in 1893 under the name St. Gall's; transferred to Richardton in 1899 and renamed St. Mary's; became an abbey in 1903; renamed Assumption Abbey in 1928; joined American-Cassinese Congregation in 1932. Located in the Diocese of Bismarck.
  - **Monasterio Benedictino de Tibati (Bogotá, D.C., Colombia)**
- **St. Martin's Abbey** (Lacey, Washington): founded in 1895; became an abbey in 1914. Located in the Archdiocese of Seattle.
- Mary Mother of the Church (Richmond, Virginia): founded in 1911; became an abbey in 1989. Located in the Diocese of Richmond.
- Saint Andrew Abbey (Cleveland, Ohio): founded in 1922; became an abbey in 1934. Located in the Diocese of Cleveland.
- **Abadía del Tepeyac** (Cuautitlán Izcalli, México): founded in 1946; became an abbey in 1971. Located in the Diocese of Izcalli.
- Abadía de San Antonio Abad (Humacao, Puerto Rico): founded in 1947; became an abbey in 1984. Located in the Diocese of Fajardo-Humancao.

== Schools Affiliated with the American-Cassinese Congregation ==
From the inception of the American-Cassinese Congregation, educational and parochial apostolates directed to the needs of Catholic immigrants in the United States formed the main works of American-Cassinese monks. Twenty educational apostolates founded by monasteries of the American-Cassinese Congregation continue to exist in 2022.

=== Colleges and Universities ===
- Belmont Abbey College in Belmont, North Carolina
- Benedictine College in Atchison, Kansas
- Benedictine University in Lisle, Illinois
- Saint Anselm College in Manchester, New Hampshire
- Saint John's University in Collegeville, Minnesota
- Saint Leo University in Saint Leo, Florida
- Saint Martin's University in Lacey, Washington
- Saint Vincent College in Latrobe, Pennsylvania
- St. Peter's College in Muenster, Saskatchewan

=== Secondary Schools ===
- Benet Academy in Lisle, Illinois
- Benedictine College Preparatory in Richmond, Virginia
- Benedictine High School in Cleveland, Ohio
- Benedictine Military School in Savannah, Georgia
- Centro Escolar del Lago in Cuautitlán Izcalli, México
- Delbarton School in Morristown, NJ
- Maur Hill-Mount Academy in Atchison, Kansas
- Saint John's Preparatory School in Collegeville, Minnesota
- St. Bede Academy in Peru, Illinois
- St. Benedict's Preparatory School in Newark, New Jersey
- St. Bernard Preparatory School in Cullman, Alabama
- Woodside Priory School in Portola Valley, California
