= Savannah Priory =

Benedictine monastery in Savannah, Georgia

Benedictine Priory of Savannah
- Location within Georgia Location within the United States
- Interactive map of Benedictine Priory of Savannah

Monastery information
- Other name: Savannah Priory
- Order: Benedictine
- Established: 1877; 149 years ago
- Mother house: Saint Vincent Archabbey, Latrobe, Pennsylvania
- Diocese: Savannah

People
- Founders: Abbot Nullius Leo Haid, O.S.B.
- Abbot: The Right Rev. Martin Bartel, O.S.B.
- Prior: Rev. David Klecker, O.S.B.

Architecture
- Functional status: Monastic
- Completion date: 1963; 63 years ago

Site
- Location: 6502 Seawright Drive, Savannah, Georgia 31406; United States
- Coordinates: 32°0′34″N 81°5′33″W

The Benedictine Priory of Savannah is a Catholic monastery of Benedictine monks located in Savannah, Georgia. The priory was founded in 1877, and is a dependency of Saint Vincent Archabbey in Latrobe, Pennsylvania, and thereby belongs to the American-Cassinese Congregation. It currently operates the Benedictine Military School for boys.

== History ==
=== First mission ===
In 1866, the Catholic bishops of the United States had met in Baltimore for the Second Plenary Council held there to continue providing order to the Catholic Church, which was still newly established in the nation. One of the decrees which resulted from that assembly was to call on all the bishops of the country to establish an outreach to the newly emancipated African-American slaves. In keeping with this mandate, William Hickley Gross, C.Ss.R., at that time the Roman Catholic Bishop of Savannah, invited the Benedictine monks of St. Vincent Abbey in Latrobe, Pennsylvania, to contribute priests to this mission in his diocese.

In response to his invitation, Abbot Boniface Wimmer, O.S.B., the founder of Benedictine life in the United States, sent two German-born monks to Savannah in 1874. The monks quickly began missionary work amongst newly freed slaves, opening St. Benedict Parish in the city that year, and a parochial school the following year.

Soon after settling there, the monks were able to obtain some parcels of land on the Isle of Hope, off the coast of Savannah, where they opened the first monastery in the Southern United States. Within a year, however, all the members of the monastic community had died of yellow fever.

=== Second mission ===
In 1877, the abbot sent a new group of monks to Georgia, under the leadership of Dom Oswald Moosmueller, O.S.B., to continue the mission to the former slaves. The monks bought 713 acres on Skidaway Island. At this site (now believed to be preserved, not part of a golf course, and is currently undergoing archaeological research) they built a new monastery and school. Unfortunately, in less than ten years, the project was abandoned as a failure because the monks could not attract enough interest among the African American community in their enterprise.

=== Benedictine Priory of Savannah ===
The ten monks of the mission, now operating under the authority of Belmont Abbey in North Carolina, made the decision to move to Savannah, where they established a monastery at 31st and Habersham Streets, adjacent to Sacred Heart Parish, which they then served. Recognizing the need for a Catholic boys' school, they established Benedictine College in 1902, later the Benedictine Military School, next to the church. In 1963, both the priory and the school moved to their current location on the southside of Savannah. Shortly after moving to the new location, the monastic community chose to return to the authority of St. Vincent Archabbey in Latrobe.

== Current status ==
Today the community consists of seven monks, all of whom serve on the staff of the school in various capacities. The monks also provide sacramental assistance in the Diocese of Savannah.

== See also ==
- Benedictine Military School
- Saint Vincent Archabbey
