= Benedictine Military School =

Catholic military high school for boys in Savannah, Georgia, United States

Location
- 6502 Seawright Drive; Savannah, Georgia 31406; United States; 32°0′34″N 81°5′33″W

Information
- Type: Private, day, college-prep, military
- Motto: Forward always forward
- Religious affiliation: Roman Catholic
- Established: 1902 (124 years ago)
- Sister school: St. Vincent's Academy
- Authority: Savannah Priory
- CEEB code: 112675
- Principal: Jacob T. Horne
- SAI: Lieutenant Colonel Stephen A. Suhr, U.S. Army (Retired)
- Headmaster: Chaplain (Colonel) Frank Ziemkiewicz, U.S. Army (Retired)
- Grades: 9–12
- Gender: Boys
- Enrollment: 400
- Colors: Maroon, white, grey
- Athletics conference: GHSA Region 3 – Class AAAA
- Sports: 13 sports + color guard and drill team
- Mascot: Cadets
- Team name: Cadets
- Accreditation: Southern Association of Colleges and Schools
- Yearbook: The Sabre
- Affiliation: Saint Vincent Archabbey National Catholic Educational Association
- Website: www.thebc400.com

Benedictine Military School (also referred to as Benedictine or BC) is a Catholic military high school for boys located in Savannah, Georgia, United States. It was founded in 1902 by the Benedictine monks of Savannah Priory, which still operates the school under the auspices of the Diocese of Savannah.

== History ==
Starting in 1874, Benedictine monks had gone to Georgia from St. Vincent Abbey in Latrobe, Pennsylvania, at the invitation of William Hickley Gross, C.Ss.R., at that time the Roman Catholic Bishop of Savannah. He was acting in response to a mandate given to all the Catholic bishops of the nation at the Second Plenary Council of Baltimore, held in 1866, to establish missions to the newly emancipated African American slaves. Two separate attempts were made to establish such a mission. By about 1900, both had failed.

Having decided to place themselves under the authority of Leo Haid, O.S.B., the Abbot Nullius of Belmont Abbey in North Carolina, ten monks established a monastery in the city at 31st and Habersham Streets, where they served Sacred Heart Parish. Recognizing the need for a Catholic boys' school, they established Benedictine College in 1902. In 1906, the groundbreaking ceremony was performed on the ground that would become the school's campus on Bull Street. In 1920, the school changed its name to Benedictine School because of the confusion that Benedictine was a college. However, the nickname "BC" stuck.

In 1963, the school moved to its current campus located on Seawright Drive on the south side of Savannah. Shortly after moving to the new location, the priory elected to return to the authority of St. Vincent Archabbey in Latrobe. Along with this change came the removal of the four year mandatory military program, with reduction to two years mandatory.

== Academics ==
Benedictine's curriculum is College Preparatory. Advanced Placement classes are offered in Language, Literature, Calculus, Environmental Science, Human Geography, Biology, Government, American History, Economics and European History, in conjunction with a religious curriculum that caters to Catholics.

The JROTC program at Benedictine, with over 350 cadets, is one of the largest in the Sixth ROTC Brigade.

== Student life ==
=== Athletics ===
Up until 2004, BC had always competed in Georgia's highest classification. In 2004, the school dropped to AAA. In 2008, to AA. In 2010, BC returned to Region 3-AAAAA. Currently, BC is in Region 3-AAAA of the GHSA.

The Cadet baseball team won state championships in 1961, 2014, and 2018.

The Cadet golf team won state championships in 1983, 1985, and 1993.

The Cadet football team won state championships in 2014 (AA), 2016 (AA), 2021 (AAAA), and 2022 (AAAA).

The Cadet soccer program won state championships in 2017 and 2018.

=== Student traditions ===
The Corps of Cadets has marched in every St. Patrick's Day parade in Savannah since 1903.

There has been a football rivalry with Savannah High School since the 1920s; a past tradition of many decades was the Thanksgiving Day contest between the two schools. However, they have not played since 2011 due to region alignments. The Cadets have begun a rivalry with various Savannah area high schools, such as Islands, since joining Region 3-AAAA in 2019.

George K. Gannam, a 1938 Benedictine graduate, was killed during the attack on Pearl Harbor and was the first Savannah resident to die during World War II. The school holds a military review and formal ceremony on or around Pearl Harbor Day (December 7) each year to commemorate Staff Sergeant Gannam. The American Legion Post 184, named in his honor, presents the Gannam Award to the most outstanding sophomore cadet, and the God and Country Award to an outstanding senior cadet. The school presents the Gannam family an American flag which, in turn, the Gannam family gives back to the school to fly on the flagpole for the following year.

The Benedictine fight song is sung to the tune of the Washington and Lee Swing. Upperclassmen expect freshmen to correctly recite the fight song within the first days of a new school year. The song is sung by students, alumni, and friends at almost every athletic and school sponsored events.

== Notable alumni ==
- LTC Thomas Nugent Courvoisie (1934), lieutenant colonel, United States Army. Mentor to author Pat Conroy and basis for the character Thomas "The Bear" Berrineau in Conroy's novel The Lords of Discipline.
- LTG John N. McLaughlin, USMC (1936), lieutenant general, United States Marine Corps.
- John "Hook" Dillon (1941) - basketball player
- Ken "Hawk" Harrelson (1959), former Major League Baseball player (1963–71) and former television broadcaster for the Chicago White Sox
- Mike Fitzgerald (1983), former Major League Baseball player for the St. Louis Cardinals. Selected by the San Francisco Giants in the first round of the 1983 MLB January Draft-Regular Phase, before electing to attend Middle Georgia State College. Was again selected the first round of the 1984 MLB June Draft-Secondary Phase by the St. Louis Cardinals and signed with the team
- Peter Roe Nugent, mayor of Savannah
- Barry Wilson, American football coach
- Luke Kromenhoek (2024), college football quarterback
- Josh Mallard (1997), former NFL defensive end for the Indianapolis Colts, Atlanta Falcons, Denver Broncos, and Cincinnati Bengals

== See also ==
- National Catholic Educational Association
