= Benedictine College Preparatory =

Catholic military school in Virginia, US

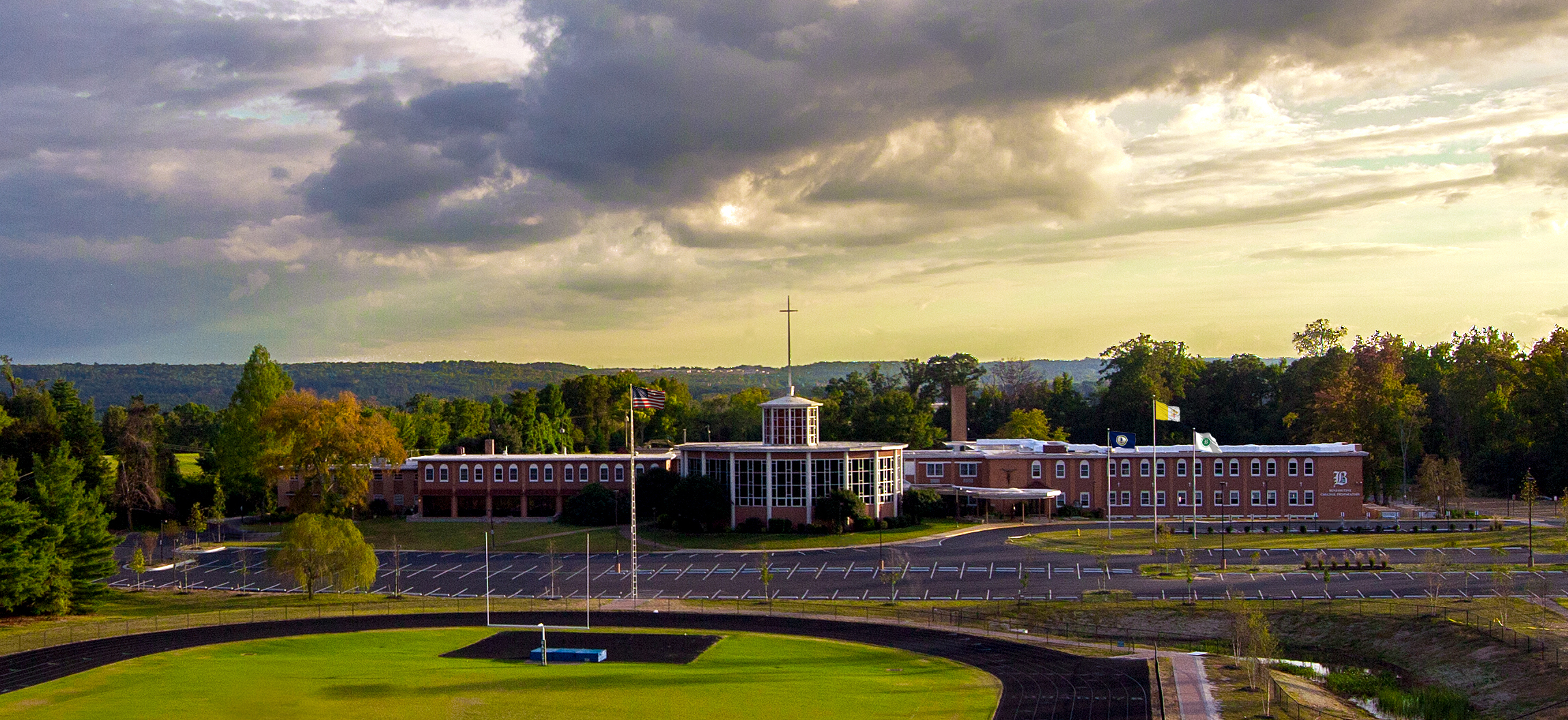

Location
- 12829 River Road; Richmond, Virginia 23238; United States; 37°34′50.3″N 77°40′28.42″W

Information
- School type: Private, Military, Day, College-prep
- Motto: Ecce Homo (Behold The Man)
- Religious affiliations: Catholic (Benedictine)
- Patron saint: St. Benedict
- Established: 1911
- Founder: Benedictine Monks
- Sister school: St. Gertrude High School
- President: Jesse Grapes
- Headmaster: Del Smith
- Commandant: Gray Walker (Interim)
- Grades: 9–12
- Gender: Boys
- Enrollment: 285 (2022–23)
- Campus: Suburban
- Colors: Green and white
- Nickname: Cadets
- Rivals: St. Christopher's; Collegiate School Trinity Episcopal School
- Accreditation: Virginia Association of Independent Schools
- Newspaper: The New Chevron
- Yearbook: The Cadet
- Tuition: $24,900 (2024-25)
- Website: http://www.benedictinecollegeprep.org

Benedictine College Preparatory is a private Catholic military high school in Goochland, Virginia. It is owned and operated by the Benedictine Society of Virginia, part of the American-Cassinese Congregation. Benedictine offers education through a private military institute model, which has long been a traditional form of education for young men in Virginia.

== History ==
Benedictine College Preparatory was founded in 1911 with 29 students, under the name of Benedictine College, by a group of Benedictine monks from Belmont Abbey in North Carolina. Seeking to continue the work of their founder by establishing learning and culture, they came to Richmond to establish a Catholic high school for boys. They adopted the military academy type model, which also meshed well with the monastic life of the monks. The order, discipline, and hierarchy of the military are very much analogous to the structures in the monastery and the Church.

In 2009, the school board was dissolved and Headmaster John McGinty was ousted by a vote of 11 senior monks of Mary Mother of the Church Abbey. Fr. Gregory Gresko, OSB, the second-in-charge of the abbey, said that McGinty's contract was not renewed for financial reasons. The school, whose enrollment under McGinty had risen to 267, was under financial stress and running on a deficit. Gresko took on the position of temporary headmaster, saying that having a Benedictine in a leadership position after years of absence was "returning to our roots."

On August 1, 2011, Benedictine High School changed its name to Benedictine College Preparatory "to reflect the school’s goal to become more academically rigorous."

In April 2011, Benedictine announced that it was selling the school's historic campus on Sheppard Street in Richmond's Museum District to the Catholic Diocese of Richmond. Later on, they planned to move forward with plans to move the school to Goochland, Virginia. The sale included a buy-back option for the school in case the plans to move the school fell through.

In the fall of the 2013–14 school year, Benedictine College Preparatory moved to the Mary Mother of the Church Abbey location and the sale of the Sheppard Street campus was finalized. The campus was sold to the Catholic Diocese of Richmond. The sale to the Diocese allowed for continued parking at the church during Sunday mass at the adjacently located St. Benedict's Parish, which was a continuation of a preexisting arrangement with the Parish. This also allowed for the renovation of the Mary Mother of the Church Abbey campus, which formerly served as home to St. John Vianney Seminary, for reinstalled educational use. Mary Mother of the Church Abbey is located in Goochland County and the school received backlash from some local residents and several alumni for the desire to sell the historic Sheppard Street campus and move so far from the urban campus that was the school's home for 100 years. The sale of the Shepard Street campus was estimated to be around $5.5 million and was used to renovate the Abbey campus, as well as to build additional facilities for the students at the new campus.

=== Leadership ===
Headmaster	Years	Principal	Years
Position created		Andrew T. Doris	1949–1959
Position created		Christopher Johann	1955–1956
Position created		Adrian W. Harmening	1962–1981
Position created		James N. McGinnis	1983–1989
Position created		David A. Bouton	1997–2000
Rickey A. Kolb	2000–2003	Position abolished	
John B. McGinty	2003–2009	Position abolished	
Gregory Gresko	2009–2010	Position abolished	
Jesse Grapes	2010–present	Position abolished	

== Student life ==
All students at Benedictine participate in the school's military leadership program. The students are known as the Corps of Cadets, and this inspired the school's athletic nickname: the Cadets. From the school's founding in 1911 through the late 1960s, the school employed a private military institute model and was not affiliated with any branch of the United States Armed Forces. Beginning in the 1960s, Benedictine adopted the U.S. Army JROTC program, which continued at the school until 2016. The JROTC program at Benedictine held the highest rating given by the U.S. Army – Honor Unit with Distinction – which allowed the school to nominate directly a student for appointment to a service academy or for an ROTC scholarship. Many Cadets have used this honor and attended the service academies and other military colleges (most notably Virginia Military Institute) to further their education. In 2016, Benedictine discontinued longstanding relationship with the U.S. Army JROTC program and returned to the private military institute model, however it is still modeled after the U.S Army. The military leadership program at Benedictine offers students the opportunity to participate in a number of activities including the Drill Team, Rifle Team, and the Pipe and Drum Corps, as well as the opportunity to hold leadership positions as cadet non-commissioned officers and cadet officers throughout the Corps.

Benedictine also offers a number of other clubs and organizations including a "Battle of the Brains" Quiz Bowl team, the National Honor Society, Model General Assembly, Model Judiciary, Student Council, Spanish Club, Latin Club, Key Club, Emmaus Group, RAMPS Community Service Club, Rugby Club, Fishing Club, and the Cadet Choir. The school also has a joint Drama Club with its sister school, St. Gertrude High School, hosts a number of military balls throughout the year, and puts on an annual Benedictine Art Show that showcases works by current Cadets.

== Military companies ==
=== Staff ===
Staff is Benedictine's commanding unit, composed of high ranking officers, and high ranking non commissioned officers, such as Master Sergeants. Staff was likely formed alongside Alpha Company in 1911. Staff's colors are Kelly Green, and White, sporting the colors of Benedictine.

=== Headquarters Company ===
Headquarters Company, formed in 1966, is a unit currently composed of senior privates, who are seniors without any rank. Headquarters colors are Red and Yellow Gold. Headquarters formerly housed assistants to members of Staff, recently in the early 2020's it was changed to be composed of senior privates. Headquarters Company is the first company in formation, the company behind Headquarters is Alpha.

=== Alpha Company ===
Alpha Company was Benedictine's first company, formed in 1911, Alpha is the schools longest serving company. Alpha Company sports the colors royal blue, and lemon yellow. Alpha Company comprises two platoons, each with four squads each. In formation Alpha Company forms in-between Headquarters Company, and Bravo Company.

=== Bravo Company ===
Bravo Company was the second formed company, formed in 1922. Bravo Company's colors are Burgundy Wine and Yellow Gold. Bravo Company is similar to Alpha in the way it is formed.

=== Charlie Company ===
Charlie Company, formed in 1939, was Benedictine's fourth company, formed after Band. Charlie Company's colors are Navy and Red. Charlie stands in-between Bravo and Delta in formation.

=== Delta Company ===
Delta company, which stands for delinquent sometimes, since the beginning of the 2024 school year. Delta's company colors are Powder Blue, or sometimes referred to as Carolina Blue, and White. Delta was formed in 1956, and was re-opened at the end of the 2023 school year, to serve as a company where the school's cadets who commonly would be written up would be sent to. The Delta Company Commander must recommend a cadet to be transferred out of Delta. Before its reformation at the end of the 2023 school year, Delta served as a normal company, with two platoons. Today Delta is formed of one platoon.

=== Band Company ===
Band Company is Benedictine's Pipe and Drum Corps. Band Company was formed in 1930 as a brass band. Sometime roughly from 2000-2011 the band would change from a brass band to a Pipe and Drum Corps. Band consists of a single platoon. The Band used to have members directly from the band class, but now some members are not in the band class. Band Company's colors are navy and white. Band members are given a blue cord, which has changed throughout time.

=== Honor Platoon ===
The Honor Platoon, formed in 1951, sporting Yellow Gold and Black as their colors is the only Company named after a fallen cadet. The Honor Platoon is named after Joseph Francis Black Junior, who was killed in a friendly fire incident during World War II. The Company, is Benedictine's ceremonial guard, drill team, and color guard. The Honor Platoon is awarded with a red cord, and burgundy berets, with the company's colors as the flash. The Honor Platoon is formed of one platoon. The Honor Platoon's drill team, has been the state champions from 2024-2025, and the drill team has placed fourth in the National high school drill team championships, in the late 1980's.

=== Echo, Foxtrot Company ===
Echo and Foxtrot Company are two companies that are currently not serving. Foxtrot was formed in 1973, and Echo in 1960.

== Athletics ==
=== Cadets basketball ===
Warren Rutledge was head coach of the Cadets for 43 years and amassed 949 total wins, making him the winningest high school coach in Virginia and eleventh in the nation. The Benedictine basketball program has won 25 Virginia State Catholic titles from 1959, 1961, 1964, 1965, 1967, 1968, 1970 through 1985, 1994, 1999, 2000 and 2003. The Cadets also hold five VISAA State Championships for Boys' Basketball for the 2003, 2007, 2008, 2011, and 2013 seasons. Since the early 1950s the Cadets have played home games on "Coach Rut Court" in the Memorial Gymnasium on the now former Benedictine campus. For three seasons, from 1951 to 1954, Benedictine's Memorial Gymnasium served as host to the University of Richmond's basketball team, before the opening of Richmond Arena. Also, since 1966 Benedictine has hosted an annual holiday boys' basketball tournament, the Benedictine Capital City Classic.

=== Cadets football ===
The football program won the VISAA Division III Championship in 2000 and 2001 and the VISAA Division I Championship in the 2014–2015, 2015-2016, 2019–2020, 2023-2024, and 2024-2025 season. The Cadets football team plays its home games at Bobby Ross Stadium which is located at the Mary Mother of the Church Abbey campus in front of the main academic building and chapel.

=== Cadets wrestling ===
The Benedictine wrestling program has won five total VISAA State Championships - 2014, 2015, 2016, and 2017, and 2020 and the team finished as State Runner-up in 2018, 2019, and 2022.

Since 2012, 39 Cadet Wrestlers have been crowned individual VISAA State Champions, and 29 have earned National Prep All-American status.

=== Other sports ===
The Cadets have earned VISAA State Championships in the following sports as well:

Baseball – 2000, 2010, 2017, 2019 (2010, 2017, and 2019); Cross Country – 1980; Soccer – 2001 & 2006

Benedictine also fields teams in lacrosse, golf, tennis, indoor & outdoor track & field, rugby, swimming, and fishing. Rather than do traditional fundraising methods, each year Benedictine hosts an athletic event known as the Benedictine Boxing Smoker which features several bouts of collegiate boxing and has included teams such as the Virginia Military Institute, Penn State, University of Maryland, Georgetown University, the University of North Carolina, East Carolina University, and Wake Forest University, among others.

Prominent graduates of the Benedictine athletic program include 2016 Olympic Gold Medalist swimmer Townley Haas, college and NFL Head Coach Bobby Ross, former NBA Head Coach John Kuester, former NFL offensive lineman Patrick Estes, NFL defensive linemen Nigel Williams & Clelin Ferrell, 2019 NFL 1st round draft pick (#4) by the Oakland Raiders(now Las Vegas Raiders), NBA forward Ed Davis, and NBA guard Michael Gbinije.

=== Athletic directors ===
Athletic Director	Years
Patrick Donahue, OSB	1953–1956
Courtney Driscoll	1956–1957
Warren S. Rutledge	1967–1999
Wes Hamner	1999–2004
W. Barry Gibrall	2004–2013
Ryan Hall	2013–2018
John Fogarty	2018–2020
Fran Pochily	2020–present

== Notable alumni ==
- Stephen K. Bannon — former White House chief strategist, senior counselor (2017) to former president Donald Trump
- Thomas J. Bliley Jr. — former U.S. Representative
- Mark Crow — former American basketball player
- Ed Davis — current professional basketball player, formerly with the Utah Jazz
- Patrick Estes — former NFL player, San Francisco 49ers
- Clelin Ferrell, current NFL player, Washington Commanders
- Michael Gbinije — current professional basketball player, formerly with the Detroit Pistons
- Townley Haas — American swimmer, won gold during the 4 × 200 metre freestyle at the 2016 Rio Olympics
- Granny Hamner — former MLB player, Philadelphia Phillies
- John Kuester — former American basketball coach and scout
- Bobby Ross — former college and NFL coach
- Joseph R. Swedish, CEO of Anthem Inc.
- Tracy Woodson — former MLB player, current head coach at the University of Richmond
- Frank Carpin - former MLB player for the Pittsburgh Pirates and Houston Astros. Went to Notre Dame

== Gallery ==
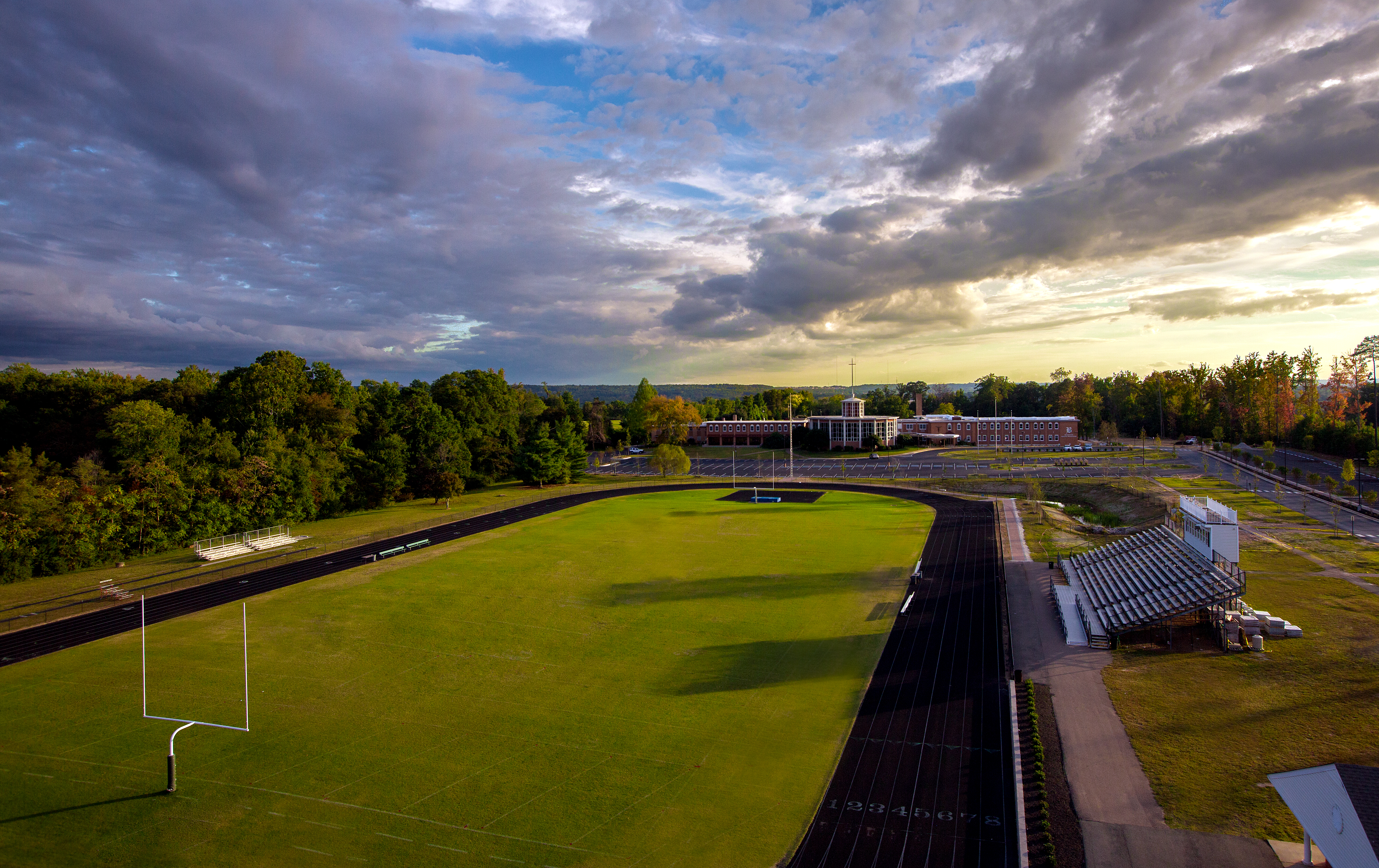
Additional aerial view of football field and campus in Goochland.

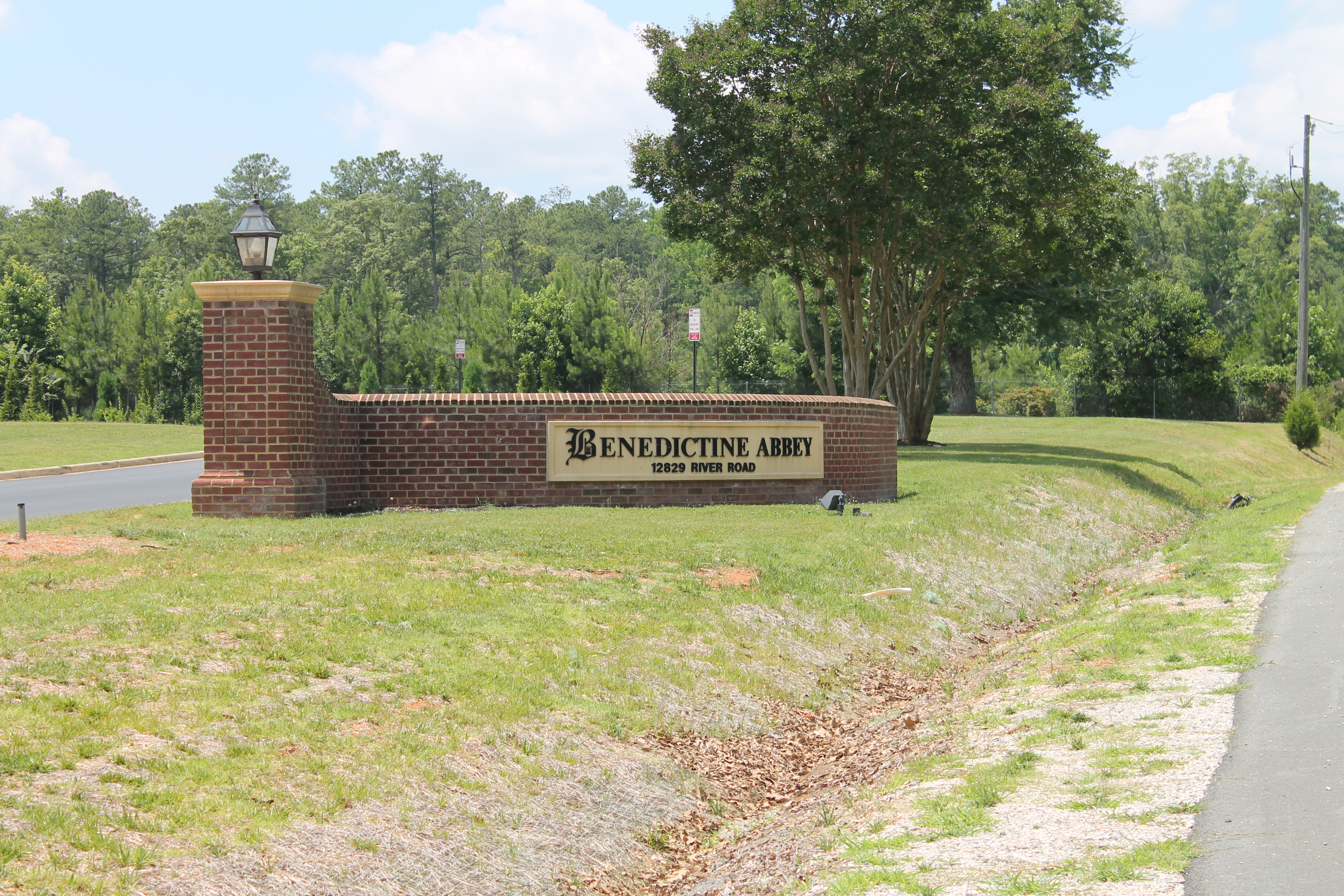
Entrance at the Goochland campus.

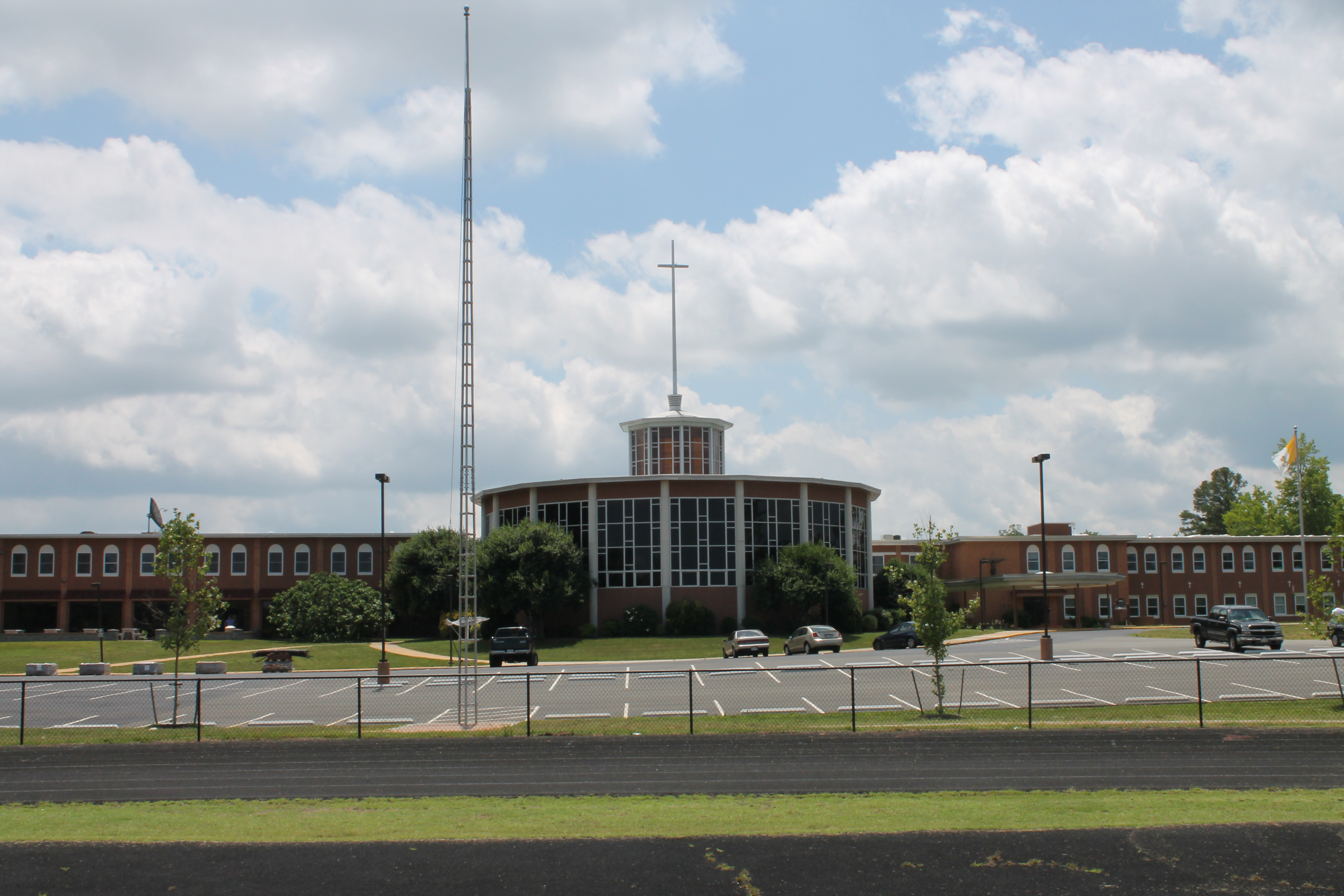
The Goochland campus main building.

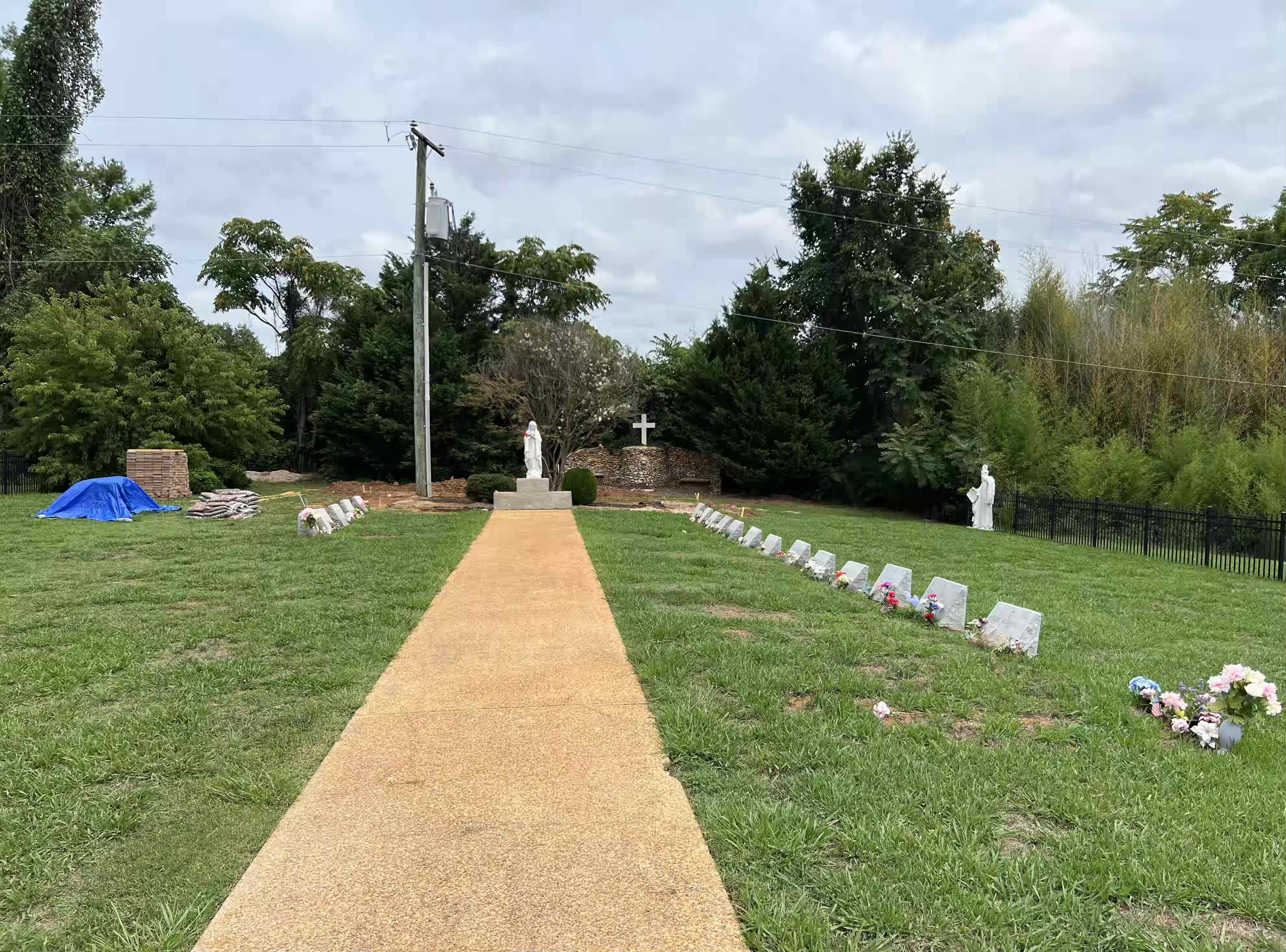
Cemetery on the Goochland campus, for the Mary Mother of the Church Abbey.

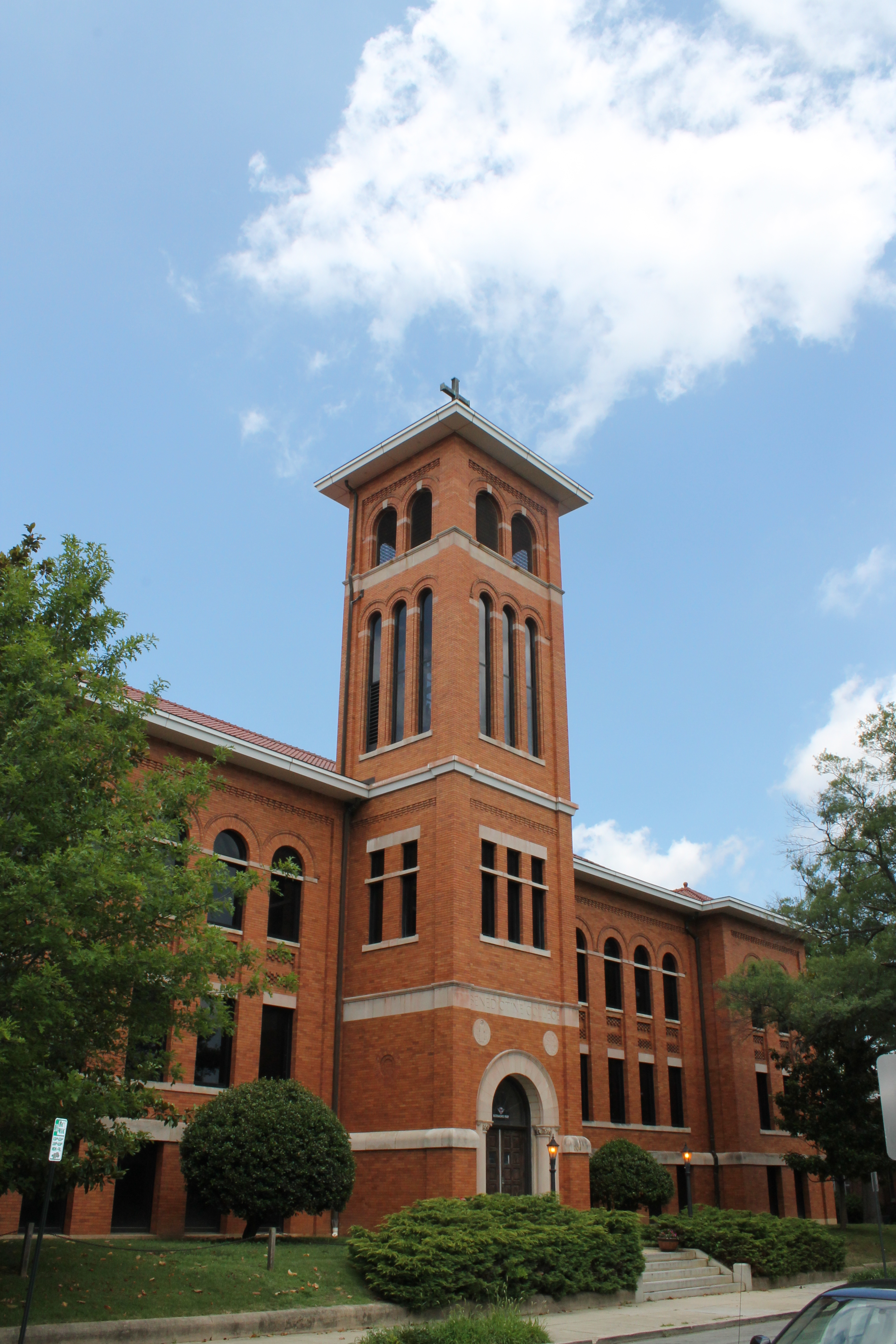
The bell tower at the former Richmond campus.

== See also ==
- Bishop Ireton High School – Formerly an all-boys' school in Virginia
