= Leo Haid =

American Benedictine abbot and Catholic bishop

His Excellency, The Most Reverend Leo Haid OSB
- Abbot nullius of Belmont Abbey & Vicar Apostolic of North Carolina
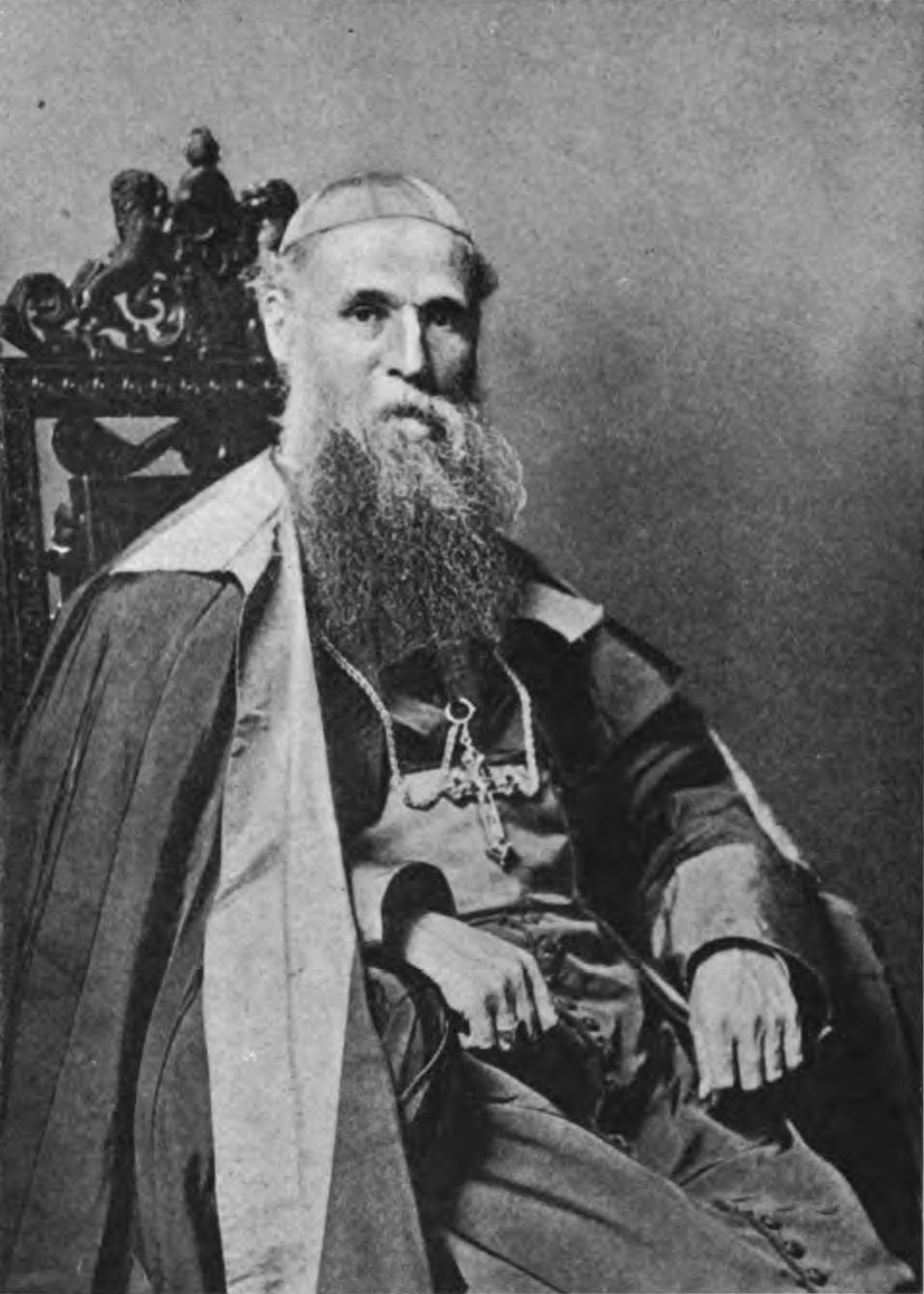
- Church: Latin Church
- Other post: Titular bishop of Messene

Orders
- Ordination: December 21, 1872 by Michael Domenec
- Consecration: July 1, 1888 by James Gibbons

Personal details
- Born: Michael Haid; July 15, 1849 Latrobe, Pennsylvania, US
- Died: July 24, 1924 (aged 75) Belmont, North Carolina, US
- Buried: Belmont Abbey Cemetery, Belmont, North Carolina, US
- Denomination: Roman Catholic
- Education: Saint Vincent Seminary
- Motto: Crescat (Let it grow)

Styles of Leo Haid
- Reference style: His Excellency; The Most Reverend
- Spoken style: Your Excellency
- Religious style: Bishop

Leo Haid OSB (born Michael; July 15, 1849 – July 24, 1924) was an American Benedictine abbot and prelate who served as abbot of the Belmont Abbey in North Carolina from 1885 to 1924. He also served as vicar apostolic of North Carolina from 1888 to 1910 and territorial abbot from 1910 to 1924.

== Biography ==
=== Early life ===
Haid was born on July 15, 1849, near Latrobe, Pennsylvania, to German immigrants John and Mary A. Stader Haid. He studied at Saint Vincent Seminary in Latrobe and there became a novice of the Benedictine Archabbey of Saint Vincent in 1868. He made first profession as a monk on September 17, 1869. He adopted the first name of Leo.

=== Priesthood ===
Haid was ordained a priest by Bishop Michael Domenec for the Benedictine Order on December 21, 1872. He then served the monastery college as a professor and chaplain. On July 13, 1885, Haid was elected as first abbot of Mary Help of Christians Abbey (known as Belmont Abbey) in Belmont, North Carolina. Travelling there in 1886, he founded a seminary at the abbey.

=== Vicar Apostolic of North Carolina ===
On February 4, 1888, Pope Leo XIII appointed Haid as apostolic vicar of North Carolina; he was consecrated bishop at the Baltimore Cathedral by Archbishop Cardinal James Gibbons on July 1, 1888, The co-consecrators were Bishops John Kain and Thomas Becker. Haid became the first American abbot-bishop.

Haid served as president of the American Cassinese Congregation from 1890 to 1902 and was a prominent authority on monastic life in the United States. He helped establish and supervise the Benedictine College Preparatory in Richmond, Virginia, the Savannah Priory in Savannah, Georgia and St Leo University in St. Leo, Florida.

On August 27, 1899, Haid dedicated St. Nicholas' Catholic Church in Zanesville, Ohio. In 1909, Haid laid the cornerstone of the St. Mary Catholic Church in Wilmington, North Carolina.

=== Territorial Abbot of Belmont ===
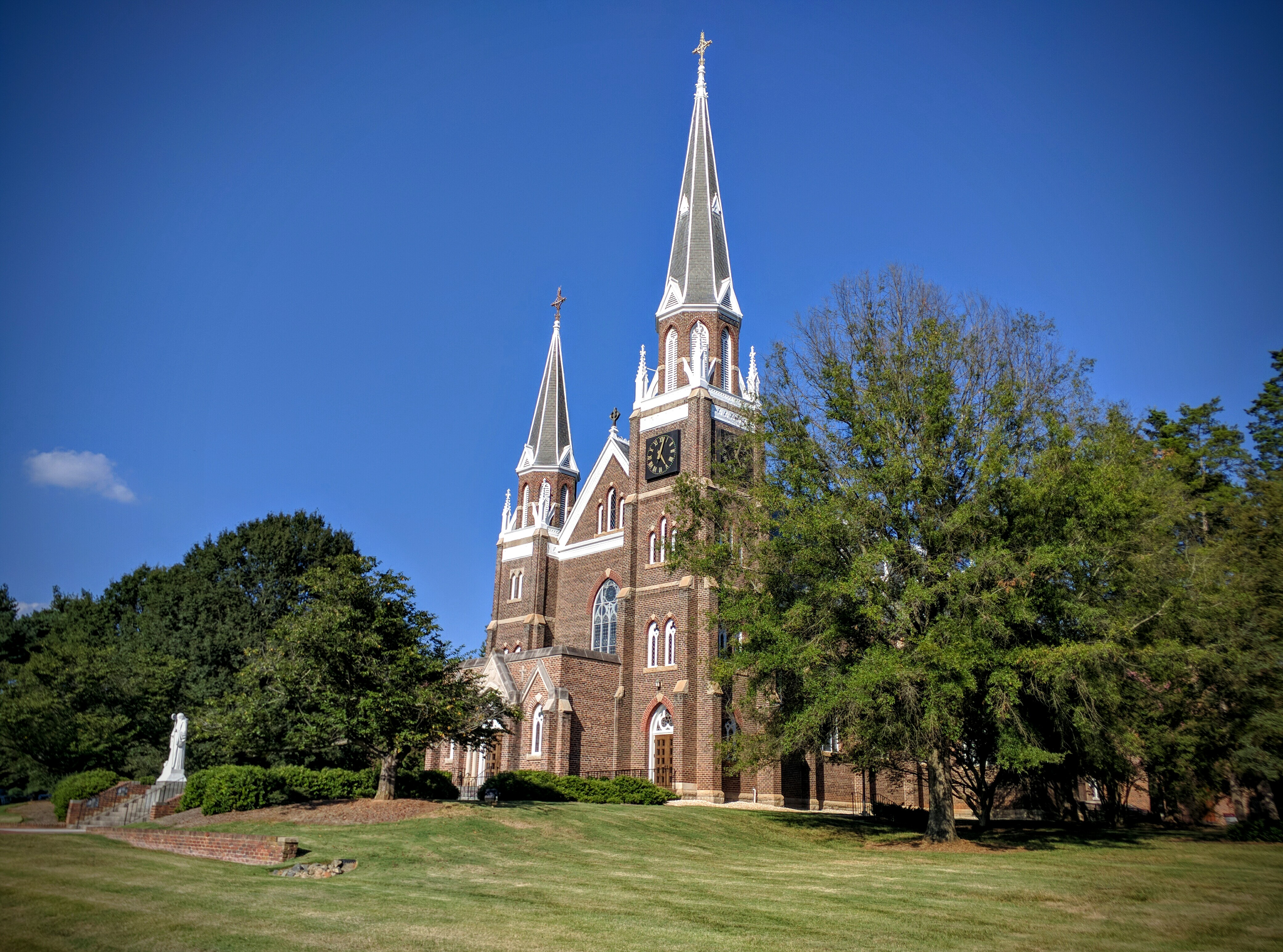
Cathedral at Belmont Abbey College, Belmont, North Carolina (2016)

On June 8, 1910 Pope Pius X erected Belmont Abbey as a territorial abbey and appointed Haid as abbot nullius, with canonical jurisdiction over eight counties in North Carolina (Gaston, Catawba, Cleveland, Burke, Lincoln, McDowell, Polk, and Rutherford).

==== Death and legacy ====
Leo Haid died at Belmont Abbey on July 24, 1924, at age 75, and was buried in the abbey cemetery.Haid Theater at Belmont Abbey College is named after Leo Haid.

== Sources ==
- Territorial Abbey of Belmont-Mary Help of Christians on Catholic-Hierarchy.org
- Anthony D. Andreassi "Leo Michael Haid" in Michael Glazier and Thomas J. Shelley (eds.) The Encyclopedia of American Catholic History The Liturgical Press: Collegeville, Minnesota 1997.
- Paschal Baumstein My Lord of Belmont: A Biography of Leo Haid Belmont, NC 1985.
