= Floyd Conway =

American politician (1929–2007)

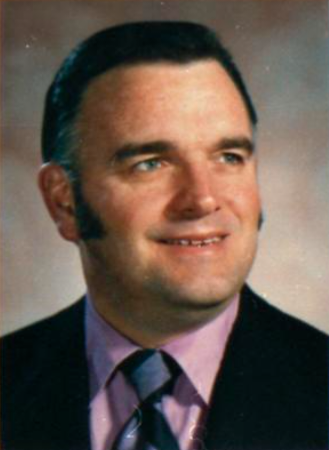
- Conway in 1971

Member of the Washington House of Representatives from the 22nd district
- In office 1969–1973

Personal details
- Born: November 7, 1929 Grays Harbor County, Washington, U.S.
- Died: October 26, 2007 (aged 77)
- Party: Republican
- Spouse: Joan Carol Barker
- Children: 5
- Education: Saint Martin's University

Floyd Conway (November 7, 1929 – October 26, 2007) was an American politician. He served as a Republican member for the 22nd district of the Washington House of Representatives.

== Life and career ==
Conway was born in Grays Harbor County, Washington. He attended Wishkah High School and Saint Martin's University.

Conway served in the Washington House of Representatives from 1969 to 1973.

Conway died in October 2007, at the age of 77.
