= St. Martin's Abbey, Washington =

Benedictine abbey in Washington State

Saint Martin's Abbey
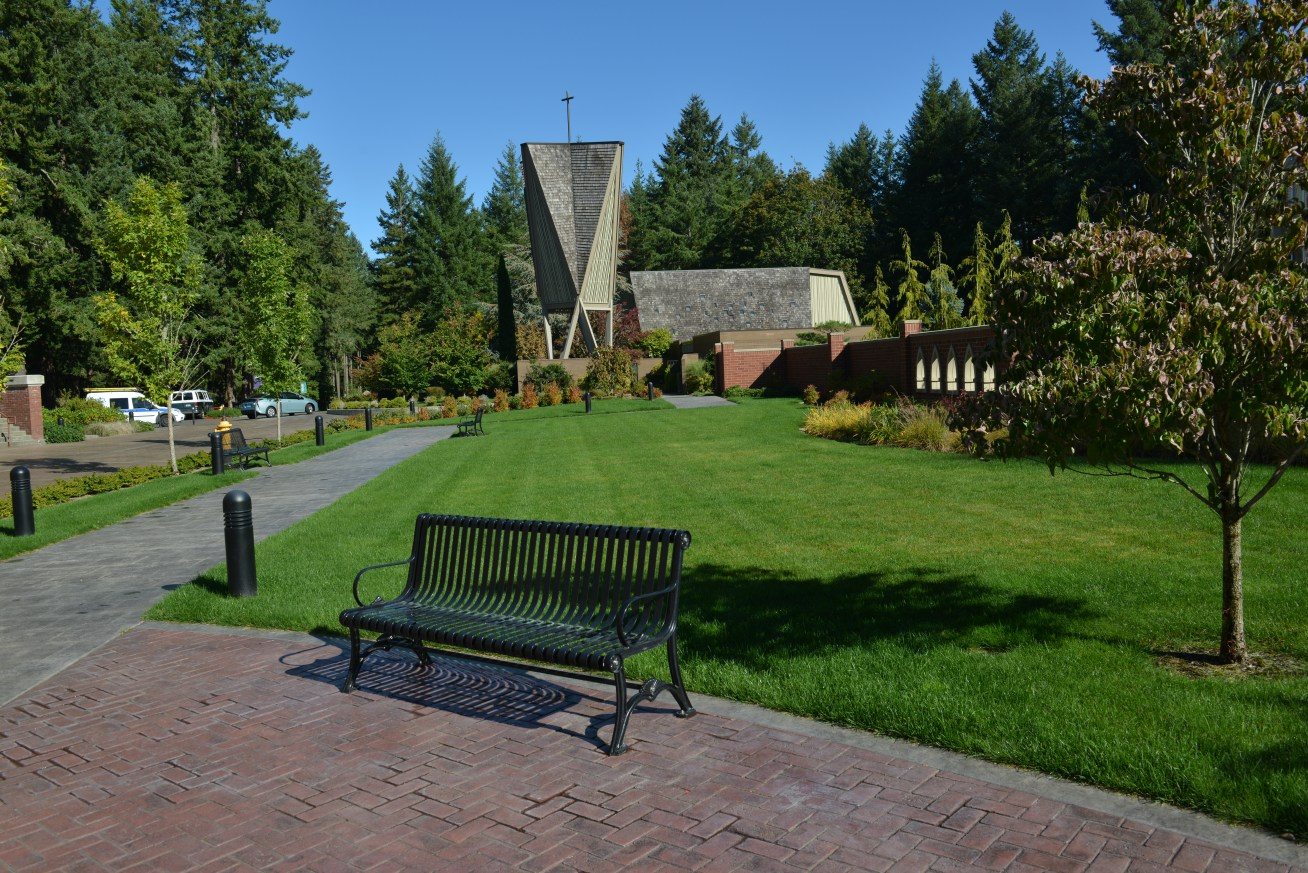

- Location in Washington Saint Martin's Abbey (the United States)
- 47.04070429731035°N 122.81458779492304°W
- Location: 5000 Abbey Way SE; Lacey, WA 98503-3200
- Country: United States
- Denomination: Roman Catholic
- Religious order: Benedictines
- Website: Saint Martin's Abbey

History
- Status: Abbey
- Founded: 1895
- Founder: Saint John's Abbey, Collegeville

Administration
- Diocese: Archdiocese of Seattle

Clergy
- Archbishop: Most Rev. Paul D. Etienne, D.D.
- Abbot: Rt. Rev. Marion Nguyen, O.S.B.

Saint Martin's Abbey is a Benedictine abbey in Lacey, Washington. Founded as a priory in 1895, the abbey is part of the American-Cassinese Benedictine Congregation and the Benedictine Confederation. As of 2020, the monastic community had 20 monks.

== History ==
In 1891, monks from Saint John's Abbey, Collegeville, Minnesota, first began pastoral ministry at "Holy Rosary Catholic Church" in Tacoma, Washington. In 1894, additional monks would be sent and the Abbot of Saint John's Abbey would purchase land at a public auction for the new priory about 50 miles south of Seattle, Washington, in Thurston County. 571 acres known as section 16 were purchased for the amount of $6,920 in what is now Lacey, Washington. Following the monastic tradition of their mother abbey, the monks began work in parishes and immediately founded an educational institution named in honor of Saint Martin of Tours. The monastic community was designated a dependent priory in 1895, then an independent priory in 1904 with Father Demetrius Juenemann, O.S.B., as the first elected Prior, and then raised to the status of an abbey in 1914.

=== University ===
As the monks founded St. Martin's Priory in 1895, they also founded as their main apostolate an educational institution known as "Saint Martin's College." In the early years they oversaw this all-boys grade school, a high school, and a two-year college housed in the one building known as "Old Main." Within forty years those smaller schools would cease and a four year college would continue and then expand to offer co-educational instruction. As part of its ongoing expansion, the college would later be designated in 2005 as a "university" now known as "St. Martin's University."

=== Abbey Church ===
The abbey church was designed by Bennett, Johnson, and Associates of Olympia, Washington, with construction completed in 1971. It features an octagonal shape worship space and is constructed mostly of brick and western red cedar. The entrance passes through an atrium and fountain area, directed toward a distinct cross topped tower, and followed by an entrance into the central liturgical space centered around a moveable altar with chairs for the congregation. With its unique design, there are no traditional church pews, but rather chairs that allow for flexible usage of the area.

=== Abbots ===
- 1914-1928 Rt. Rev. Oswald Baran, O.S.B.
- 1928-1943 Rt. Rev. Lambert Burton, O.S.B.
- 1943-1964 Rt. Rev. Raphael Heider, O.S.B.
- 1964-1972 Rt. Rev. Gerald Desmond, O.S.B.
- 1972-1977 Rt. Rev. Dunstan Curtis, O.S.B.
- 1977-1986 Rt. Rev. Adrian Parcher, O.S.B.
- 1986-1993 Rt. Rev. Conrad Rausch, O.S.B.
- 1993-2020 Rt. Rev. Neal Roth, O.S.B.
- 2020–present Rt. Rev. Marion Qui-Thac Nguyen, O.S.B.

== Present ==
The monks of Saint Martin's Abbey, like all Benedictine monks, hold the public communal prayer of the Church (the Opus Dei or Work of God) at the center of their lives. In common with other monasteries of the Benedictine Confederation, their monastic tradition also places stress on daily periods of individual prayer known as Lectio Divina (the prayerful reading of scripture). Communal prayers are open to the public as they are prayed in the abbey church. Their primary work apostolate remains St. Martin's University.

== Gallery ==
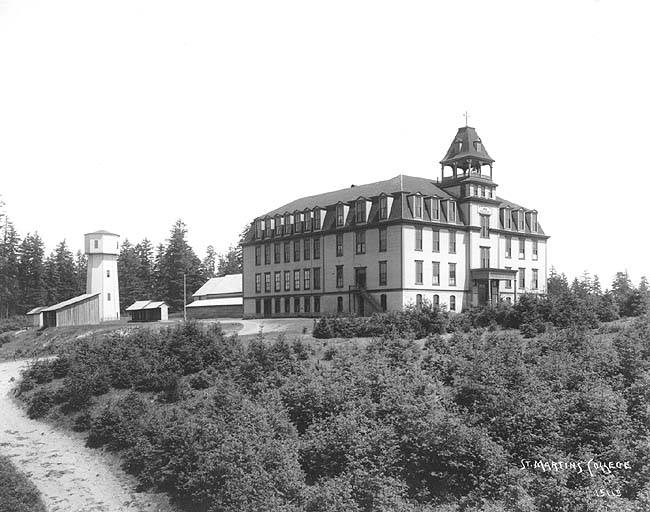

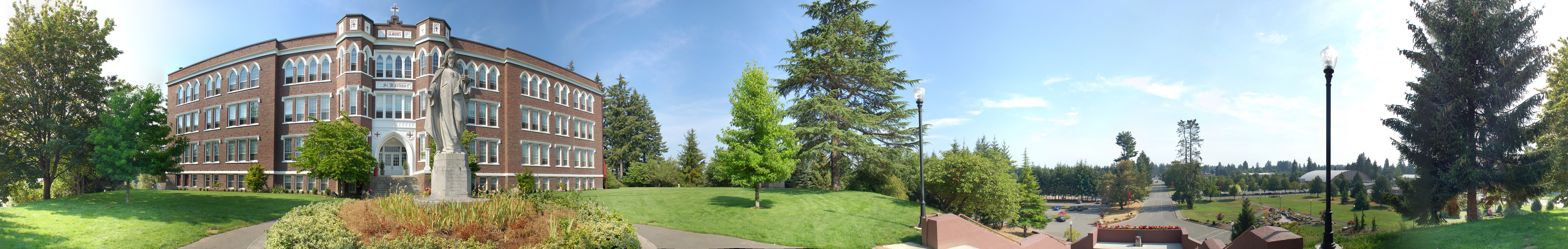
