= Douglas Robert Nowicki =

American Benedictine abbot and priest (1945–2024)

The Right Reverend Douglas R. Nowicki, O.S.B.
- Archabbot of Saint Vincent Archabbey
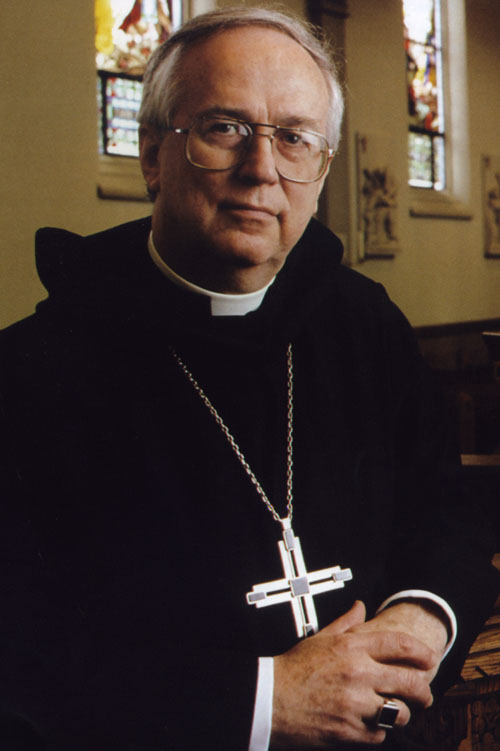
- Elected: March 1, 1991 - June 2020
- Predecessor: Paul Maher
- Successor: Martin Bartel

Orders
- Ordination: May 21, 1972 by William G. Connare

Personal details
- Born: May 8, 1945 Everson, Pennsylvania, United States
- Died: July 23, 2024 (aged 79) Allegheny General Hospital, Pittsburgh, Pennsylvania United States
- Buried: Saint Vincent Cemetery, Latrobe, Pennsylvania United States
- Denomination: Catholic
- Parents: Sylvester Nowicki & Evelyn Jackamonis
- Occupation: Priest, Archabbot
- Education: Saint Vincent College, Saint Vincent Seminary, University of Tennessee
- Motto: Cor ad Cor Loquitur (Heart speaks to Heart)
- Coat of arms

Douglas Robert Nowicki, O.S.B. (May 8, 1945 - July 23, 2024) was an American Benedictine monk and Catholic priest. From 1991 to 2020, he served as the 11th Archabbot of Saint Vincent Archabbey in Latrobe, Pennsylvania, and by extension, the Chancellor of Saint Vincent College and the Chancellor of Saint Vincent Seminary. Nowicki became solemnly professed on July 11, 1966, and was ordained a priest on May 21, 1972. He served the monastic community and the Diocese of Pittsburgh in various capacities before his election as archabbot in 1991.

== Early life and education ==
Nowicki was born in Everson, Pennsylvania, on May 8, 1945, the son of Sylvester and Evelyn (Jackamonis) Nowicki. He was one of four children.

Nowicki attended Catholic grade schools at Saint Joseph, Everson, and Holy Cross, Youngwood, Pennsylvania. He earned a Bachelor of Arts degree in philosophy from Saint Vincent College in 1968, a Master of Divinity from Saint Vincent Seminary in 1971 and a doctorate in clinical psychology from the University of Tennessee in 1977.

== Priesthood ==
Nowicki was professed as a Benedictine on July 11, 1966, and ordained to the priesthood at the Archabbey Basilica on May 21, 1972, by Bishop William G. Connare of Greensburg. Prior to his election as Archabbot, Nowicki had served for five years as Secretary for Education of the Diocese of Pittsburgh from 1986 to 1991 and Pastor of Our Lady, Queen of Peace Parish, North Side, Pittsburgh from 1984 to 1986. At Saint Vincent College he served as Chairman of the Department of Psychology from 1979 to 1984 and Associate Academic Dean from 1983 to 1984. From 1978 through 1983, he was a member of the staff in the Behavioral Science Department at Children's Hospital of Pittsburgh. Nowicki also served as a psychological consultant to Mister Rogers' Neighborhood from 1978 to 1984.

== Abbacy ==
Styles of Douglas R. Nowicki
- Reference style: The Right Reverend
- Spoken style: Archabbot
- Religious style: Father Abbot
- Posthumous style: not applicable

Nowicki was first elected by his fellow monks on January 8, 1991, to become the eleventh Archabbot of Saint Vincent. On March 1, 1991, he received the Abbatial Blessing from Anthony G. Bosco, Bishop of Greensburg.

Under Nowicki, Saint Vincent Archabbey, College, Seminary and Parish underwent major developments, including a new bypass and entrance road to the Saint Vincent campus, the Winnie Palmer Nature Reserve, the Fred M. Rogers Center for Early Learning and Children's Media, the Carey Student Center, the Elizabeth Roderick Center and the John and Annette Brownfield Center, a new apse organ in the Archabbey Basilica along with restoration of the Basilica Crypt, the construction of two college dormitories, Rooney Hall and Saint Benedict Hall, the renovation/restoration of the Archabbey Basilica, construction of a new parish center for Saint Vincent Parish, renovation of Prep Hall and the Latimer Family Library, the establishment of a minority scholarship program named in his honor and the construction of the $40 million Sis and Herman Dupré Science Pavilion.

== Coat of arms ==
Coat of arms of Douglas Robert Nowicki
Notes Archabbot Douglas Nowicki's coat of arms combines his own design with the design of Saint Vincent Archabbey. The left side of the shield displays the archabbatial design while the right side contains a reference to the Archabbot's motto. Adopted 8 March 1991 Escutcheon Imposed on the right are the coat of arms of Saint Vincent Archabbey. On the right are three yellow hearts imposed on a red field. Motto Cor ad Cor Loquitur (the same motto as John Henry Cardinal Newman) Symbolism "Galero": an abbatial crozier veiled with a "sudarium" by a black galero, or wide-brimmed hat, signifies the rank of abbot. The blue and white field represents the flag of Bavaria, the country from which founder of the abbey, Abbot Boniface Wimmer, came, while the "V" represents Saint Vincent de Paul, the patron saint of the Archabbey. The three yellow hearts imposed on a red field are representative of the archabbot's personal motto, "Heart speaks to heart."

== Death ==
Archabbot Douglas Nowicki died on Tuesday, July 23, 2024, in Allegheny General Hospital in Pittsburgh, Pennsylvania, following a brief illness.
