= Patrick Estes =

American football player (born 1983)

No. 78, 88
- Position: Offensive tackle

Personal information
- Born: February 4, 1983 (age 43); Richmond, Virginia, U.S.
- Listed height: 6 ft 7 in (2.01 m)
- Listed weight: 310 lb (141 kg)

Career information
- High school: Benedictine (Richmond)
- College: Virginia (2001-2004)
- NFL draft: 2005: 7th round, 248th overall pick

Career history
- San Francisco 49ers (2005–2007); Berlin Thunder (2006); Buffalo Bills (2007)

Career NFL statistics
- Games played: 8
- Stats at Pro Football Reference

Patrick Brion Estes (born February 4, 1983) is an American former professional football player who was an offensive tackle in the National Football League (NFL). He played college football for the Virginia Cavaliers. He was selected by the San Francisco 49ers in the seventh round of the 2005 NFL draft with the 248th overall pick.

== Early life ==
Estes played high school football in Richmond, Virginia, for the Benedictine Cadets. He also was a stand out basketball player there.

He played in the first ever U.S. Army All-American Bowl game on December 30, 2000.

== College career ==
Estes, who was considered one of the top recruits in the country at tight end, spent his career as a backup to Virginia's All-American Heath Miller but received frequent playing time particularly as a blocker. In a game against South Carolina in 2002, he caught a touchdown pass from Miller. Though he played as a tight end in college he was converted to offensive tackle by the 49ers.

== Professional career ==
=== Career transactions ===
- Released by the 49ers on September 5, 2007.
- Signed by the 49ers on October 2, 2007.
- Released by the 49ers on October 9, 2007.
- Signed by the 49ers on November 8, 2007.
- Released by the 49ers on December 18, 2007.
- Claimed off waivers by the Buffalo Bills on December 19, 2007.
- Released by the Buffalo Bills on August 30, 2008.

== Personal life ==
Patrick became the athletic director at The Covenant School (Charlottesville, Virginia) in July 2024. He announced his candidacy for the Democratic Nomination for Albemarle County Sheriff in February 2019.
