= Joseph R. Swedish =

American businessman (born 1951)

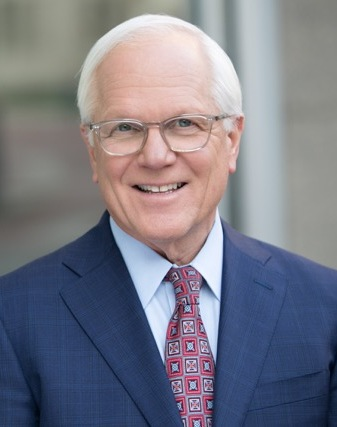
- Born: May 17, 1951 (age 75); Richmond, Virginia, United States
- Education: University of North Carolina at Charlotte; Duke University
- Occupations: American Healthcare and Insurance Executive
- Title: Former Chairman, President and CEO, Anthem, Inc.
- Spouse: Gene N. Swedish
- Children: 3

Joseph Robert Swedish (born 1951) is an American healthcare executive and leader. He is a former senior adviser to the board of directors at Anthem, Inc., a Fortune 29 company, and was the CEO of Anthem, Inc. from 2013 to 2017. For 12 years in a row Swedish was named Modern Healthcare’s one of the 100 Most Influential People in Healthcare.

== Early life and education ==
Swedish is the son of Eastern European immigrants. His father changed the family name from "Szwedzicki" to "Swedish" upon emigration through Ellis Island in 1949 from post WW II Europe as Displaced Persons. He was born in Richmond, Virginia and attended elementary school at an orphanage while growing up on his parents’ farm in Virginia. Swedish also attended a Catholic ROTC military college preparatory high school.

Swedish received his bachelor's degree from the University of North Carolina at Charlotte, and then a master's degree in health administration from Duke University.

== Business career ==
=== Anthem, Inc. ===
From 2013 to 2018, Swedish served as chairman, president and CEO of Anthem, Inc. Under Mr. Swedish's leadership, the company experienced remarkably strong financial performance and growth. As CEO, Anthem's membership grew by four million, or 11 percent, the average share price nearly quadrupled from approximately $60 per share to $250 per share, and operating revenue increased 39 percent to over $89 billion. Core strategic imperatives included improving medical costs, working with physicians to improve healthcare quality and access, and improving the consumer experience. During his tenure, Swedish reinvigorated Anthem's culture by aligning the company's leadership to create a unified, inclusive and values-centered culture where associates are committed to an authentic mission.

=== Trinity Health ===
From 2005 to 2013, Swedish served as president and CEO of Trinity Health, a 22-state integrated healthcare delivery system. Under Swedish's direction, the healthcare system operated 47 acute-care hospitals, 423 outpatient facilities, 32 long-term care facilities, and 34 home health offices and hospice programs. During his tenure, he led the development of the nation's first large scale electronic medical records system, and accelerated its financial and operational performance, growing revenue by nearly 50 percent from less than $6 billion to approximately $9 billion in 2012. He successfully managed the merger with Catholic Healthcare East in 2012 to create the then second largest Catholic healthcare system in the United States.

=== Centura Health ===
From 1999 to 2005, Swedish served as president and CEO of Colorado's Centura Health, which was the state's largest hospital system and fourth largest private employer. Under his leadership, Centura improved its financial stability, strengthened its voice on healthcare policy issues, and made major investments in system expansion with strategic capital deployment to grow, to scale and improve the quality of care and services.

=== Hospital Corporation of America ===
From 1994 to 1998, Swedish served as president and CEO for the Central Florida Division and East Florida Division of Hospital Corporation of America, which consisted of 21 hospitals and 12 joint ventured ambulatory surgery centers in six markets from Orlando to South Florida (Miami, Fort Lauderdale, Palm Beach).

=== Additional CEO positions ===
Prior to 1994, Swedish held several leadership positions including serving as the president and CEO of Winter Park Memorial Hospital and Park Health Corp, in Winter Park Florida; president and CEO of Mary Washington Hospital, in Fredericksburg, Virginia; and CEO of Horizon HealthCorp. subsidiary of Memorial Mission Medical Center in Asheville, North Carolina.

Business positions
| | President and CEO for the Central Florida Division and East Florida Division of Hospital Corporation of America 1994–1998 | Succeeded by Chuck Hall |
| Preceded by Gary Susnara | President and CEO of Centura Health 1999–2005 | Succeeded by Gregory Burfitt |
| Preceded by Judy Pelham | Trinity Health 2005–2013 | Succeeded by Dr. Richard Gilfillan |
| Preceded by Angela Braly | Chairman, president and CEO of Anthem, Inc. March 2013 – May 2018 | Succeeded by Gail Boudreaux |

== Board roles ==
- Concord Health Partners, LLC, original co-founder & partner; currently Partner Emeritus
- IBM, former member of board of directors
- CDW, board of directors
- Mesoblast, former member of board of directors and past chairman of the board
- Centrexion Therapeutics, board of directors
- Navitus Health Solutions, board of directors
- Trout Unlimited, board of trustees
- The Nature Conservancy (Colorado Chapter), board of trustees
- Previous Anthem, Inc., executive chairman, president and CEO, Anthem Board of Directors
- Previous chairman of America's Health Insurance Plans (AHIP)
- Previous chairman of the board, Catholic Health Association
- Duke University's Fuqua School of Business board of visitors, member and past chairman of the board
- Swedish has also held board and advisory positions with American Hospital Association; Coventry Health Care, RehabCare Group, Inc.; BankFIRST, Cross Country, Inc;, National Quality Forum; Winter Park Health Foundation; and Loyola University Chicago

== Awards and recognition ==
- Under Swedish's CEO leadership, Anthem was recognized by Ethisphere on the 2018 list of World's Most Ethical Companies
- 2005–2017 Modern Healthcare’s 100 Most Influential People in Healthcare
- 2016 Crain Communications’ Top 100 Innovators list
- 2003 Ernst & Young Entrepreneur of the Year—Rocky Mountain Region award, regarded as one of the most prestigious business award programs in the country
- University Medal, board of regents, University of Colorado
- Fellow, American College of Healthcare Executives
