= Martin Bartel =

American monk and priest (born 1955)

The Right Reverend Martin de Porres Bartel OSB
- Archabbot of Saint Vincent Archabbey
- Diocese: Diocese of Greensburg
- Elected: June 23, 2020
- Predecessor: Douglas Robert Nowicki
- Previous post: President of Saint Vincent College

Orders
- Ordination: May 25, 1985 by William G. Connare

Personal details
- Born: November 14, 1955 (age 70) Barberton, Ohio, United States
- Denomination: Catholic
- Education: University of Akron
- Motto: Brothers together as one Psalm 132/133
- Coat of arms

Martin de Porres Bartel OSB (born 1955) is an American Benedictine monk and Catholic priest, elected in 2020 to serve as the twelfth Archabbot of Saint Vincent Archabbey in Latrobe, Pennsylvania.

== Life and career ==
Born on November 14, 1955, in Barberton, Ohio to Robert and Clara (née Weigand) Bartel Sr., the second-youngest of ten children. He graduated from Barberton High School in 1974 and Temple University in 1979. Bartel made his simple profession of vows as a monk of Saint Vincent Archabbey on July 10, 1980, solemn profession of vows on July 11, 1983, and was ordained a priest on May 25, 1985, by Bishop William G. Connare of the Diocese of Greensburg. He served in various administrative roles at St. Vincent College, including as assistant controller, assistant treasurer, and acting academic dean. On June 23, 2020, he was elected archabbot to succeed Douglas Robert Nowicki. His abbatial motto is "Brothers together as one", from Psalm 132/133. Previously, Bartel had served as pastor of several parishes in the Diocese of Pittsburgh and the Diocese of Greensburg. He previously served as the President of Saint Vincent College from 1995 to 2000, and also sat on the board of directors of Serra Catholic High School in McKeesport, Pennsylvania.
