= Saint Vincent Archabbey =

Benedictine monastery in Pennsylvania

- Location within Pennsylvania Location within the United States
- Interactive map of Saint Vincent Archabbey

Monastery information
- Order: Benedictine
- Established: October 24, 1846
- Mother house: Metten Abbey (Founded 766)
- Diocese: Diocese of Greensburg

People
- Founders: Archabbot Boniface Wimmer, OSB
- Abbot: Rt. Rev. Martin Bartel, OSB
- Prior: Rev. Maximilian Maxwell, OSB

Site
- Location: Latrobe, Pennsylvania, U.S.
- Coordinates: 40°17′34″N 79°24′03″W
- Public access: Yes
- Website: www.saintvincentarchabbey.org

Saint Vincent Archabbey is a Benedictine monastery in Westmoreland County, Pennsylvania in the city of Latrobe. A member of the American-Cassinese Congregation, it is the oldest Benedictine monastery in the United States and the largest in the Western Hemisphere. The shrine is dedicated to Saint Vincent de Paul.

Pope Pius XII raised the monastery church to the status of a Minor basilica via his decree Quasi fons lucis on 25 August 1955.

== Activities ==
The Benedictine monks of Saint Vincent operate and teach at Saint Vincent Basilica Parish, Saint Vincent College, and Saint Vincent Seminary. The monks also provide pastoral care for Catholics in the dioceses of Baltimore, Greensburg, Pittsburgh, Harrisburg, Altoona-Johnstown, and Richmond. The monks also run a military school from the Savannah Priory in Savannah, Georgia (Benedictine Military School). The archabbey also oversees Wimmer Priory in Taiwan, and Saint Benedict Priory in Brazil.

The original abbey structures, including the present church, were designed by the German-American architect J. William Schickel and built between 1891 and 1905. The archabbey church was dedicated by bishop Regis Canevin of Pittsburgh on August 24, 1905 and declared a minor basilica by Pius XII on the same date in 1955.

The monks operate St. Vincent Archabbey Gristmill, listed on the National Register of Historic Places in 1978.

Monks from the abbey founded Holy Cross Abbey (Cañon City, Colorado), Newark Abbey (Newark, New Jersey) (founded as St Mary's), Saint John's Abbey (Collegeville, Minnesota), Saint Bernard Abbey (Cullman, Alabama), Saint Benedict Abbey (Atchison, Kansas), Saint Mary's Abbey (Morristown, New Jersey), Saint Bede Abbey (Peru, Illinois), Saint Procopius Abbey (Lisle, Illinois), and Mary Help of Christians Abbey (Belmont, North Carolina).

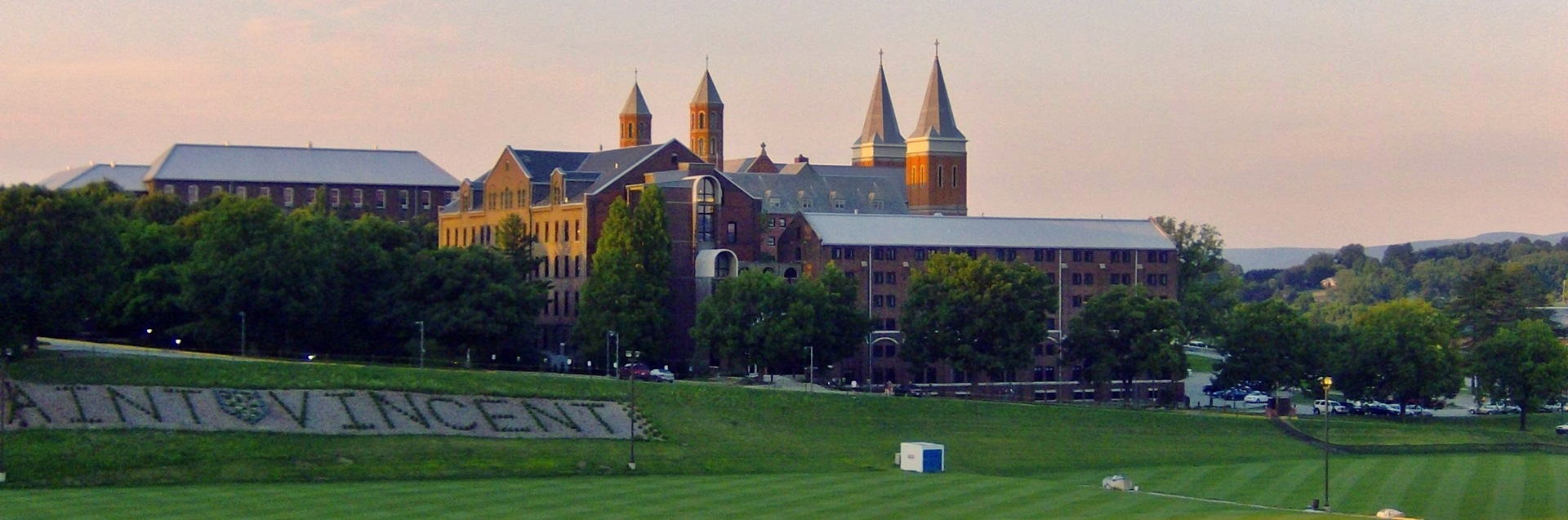
Saint Vincent's Basilica Panorama

== Leadership ==
The current archabbot of St. Vincent Archabbey is Martin de Porres Bartel, who was elected by the monastic community on June 23, 2020. He is the twelfth archabbot of Saint Vincent. Bartel succeeded the Rt. Rev. Douglas R. Nowicki.

Over its almost 200 years of existence, the archabbey has had twelve archabbots:

- Boniface Wimmer (1855 to 1887)
- Andrew Hintenach (1888 to 1892)
- Leander Schnerr (1892 to 1918)
- Aurelius Stehle (1918 to 1930)
- Alfred Koch (1930 to 1949)
- Denis Strittmatter (1949 to 1963)
- Rembert Weakland (1963 to 1967)
- Egbert Donovan (1967 to 1979)
- Leopold Krul (1979 to 1983)
- Paul Maher (1983 to 1991)
- Douglas R. Nowicki (1991 to 2020)
- Martin Bartel (2020 to present)
