= National High School Drill Team Championships =

The National High School Drill Team Championships is a Drill Team Competition, held in Daytona Beach, Florida, in the month of May each year at the ocean center. The Drill teams from across the nation converge to compete in both the Master's and the Challenge level competitions. This event is currently the largest centralized drill team event. The company which runs the competition is Sports Network International (SNI), which hosts football and other Junior ROTC events as well. Although it has been held since 1982, it only became an official when the Army Cadet Command became the sponsor in 1988.

== History ==
The National High School Drill Team Championships began in 1982 by Bill Squires, a Drill Team Instructor of Fort Knox High School in Fort Knox, Kentucky. He traveled to Florida to observe quality of other athletic competition, from Sports Network International (SNI). The first competition was then held in Orlando, Florida, in 1983 with invited teams. Over the early years, it was then spread about the Nationals to the teams across the United States. As the number of team members increased, the competition got expanded even bigger, and more expert teams in the United States worked hard, in order to participate in the Nationals.

== Recognition ==
After spending four years in Orlando, the National Team moved out to their home in Daytona Beach, Florida in 1986. Ever since the move to Daytona Beach, The National High School Drill Team Championships event has been completely filled up every year, while in Online every team slot is opened. In October 1987, SNI made the publication called IDR (Infantry Drill Regulation), through the sponsorship of Embry-Riddle. This time period is distributed to over 2,500 JROTC and non-affiliated drill teams throughout the world. IDR contains big highlights and statistics, including interviews of excellent drill teams and cadets. SNI continued the commitment to IDR, ensuring every JROTC unit will keep continuing to receive periodical featuring in the state of competition drills and ceremonies.

== Promotion ==
"The Nationals" quickly became word within the entire drill community through their fame. In the fall of 1988, SNI got contacted by the U.S. Army Cadet Command through the possibility of collaborating themselves as the sole military sponsor of the now-famous drill competition. Within the NHSDTC goals being strongly rooted in the place of allowing each Cadet to "be the best they can be", the marriage is a natural. The Cadet Command then soon became the event's main primary sponsor. This has led to several long projects, most notably remain the sending of educational and instructional videotapes, and the start of the National Capital Drill Classic in Washington, DC (a regional Drill event that began in 1992).

== Competition ==
On May 3, 2002, the MCJROTC cadets of Kubasaki High School in Okinawa, Japan achieved the Challenge Level Armed Division title at the 20th annual National High School Drill Team Championships in Daytona Beach, Florida. One of the students at Kubasaki High School, who is a Junior and a Cadet major, quoted "We're not used to losing", who is also an executive officer of the Kubasaki Marine Corps Junior Reserve Officers' Training Corps unit. With those words in mind, the MCJROTC Cadets of Kubasaki High School train themselves to prepare the 2002 National High School Drill Team Championships. The Dragons then defeated 46 schools from 34 states, with Puerto Rico and Japan getting to the finals to win the Challenge Level Armed Division title for the 20th annual championship at Daytona Beach, Florida. Japan ended up being the winner, and the team came home with a national championship, and multiple collection of trophies, putting them in three out of the competition's four events. The Dragons took top honor's in regular drills while also doing inspection, and the team took third place in Color Guard competition.

== Plan ==
The Nationals are connected with many different groups that help in the production of the event every year. These groups include The Marine Corps League, the USMC Delayed Entry Program (DEPP) recruits, and other Daytona Beach area military organizations being retired. In 1997, the Nationals will feature an expansion schedule that will allow a big competition field that will make the event better and entertaining. It will also include a single day, Challenge Level drill competition immediately after the two-day master's Level competition that will schedule the following day. This will provide a bigger number of schools to also participate in the event, while also keeping the number of schools who would like to participate on attending but can't be due to space limitations to a minimum. The Western Division of the NHSDTC continues to be a long-term goal of SNI. With the scheduled expansion in 1997, the Western Division expansion is expected in 2000 as the start date.

== Present Day ==
Today, many of the members continue to increase their enrollment through the NHSDTC Program, and people have been so overly positive on this Program, they decided to support their causes even more than in the past years. As people keep staying in the teams, more people end up feeling happy and cheerful than they were before. The NHSDTC went to multiple events and locations and had some wins and losses over time. Many of the parent's would agree that this is for the best on their children, since teaches them the effort of improving your skills through hard work, and to end up reaching their full potential when the time is right. They support not just their team, but to serve their duty to their nation under good cause.
