= Trinity Benedictine Monastery =

Community of monks in Nagano Prefecture, Japan

Coordinates: 35°54′39.0″N 138°13′44.2″E

Religion
- Affiliation: Roman Catholic Church
- Leadership: Prior Roman Paur

Location
- Location: Fujimi, Suwa District, Nagano Prefecture, Japan
- Interactive map of Trinity Benedictine Monastery

Website
- http://www.osb.or.jp/

Trinity Benedictine Monastery was a small community of Benedictine monks in the town of Fujimi, Nagano Prefecture, Japan. The monastery was started in 1999, before which the Benedictines used Saint Anselm's parish and priory (Meguro Church) in Tokyo.

The premises held a chapel, a chapter house, library, dining and leisure space, and rooms for monks and guests. As it was located in Japan all prayers were held in Japanese. The monastery closed permanently in October 2016.
