= Saint Martin's University =

Benedictine university in Lacey, Washington, US

Coordinates: 47°02′26″N 122°48′56″W

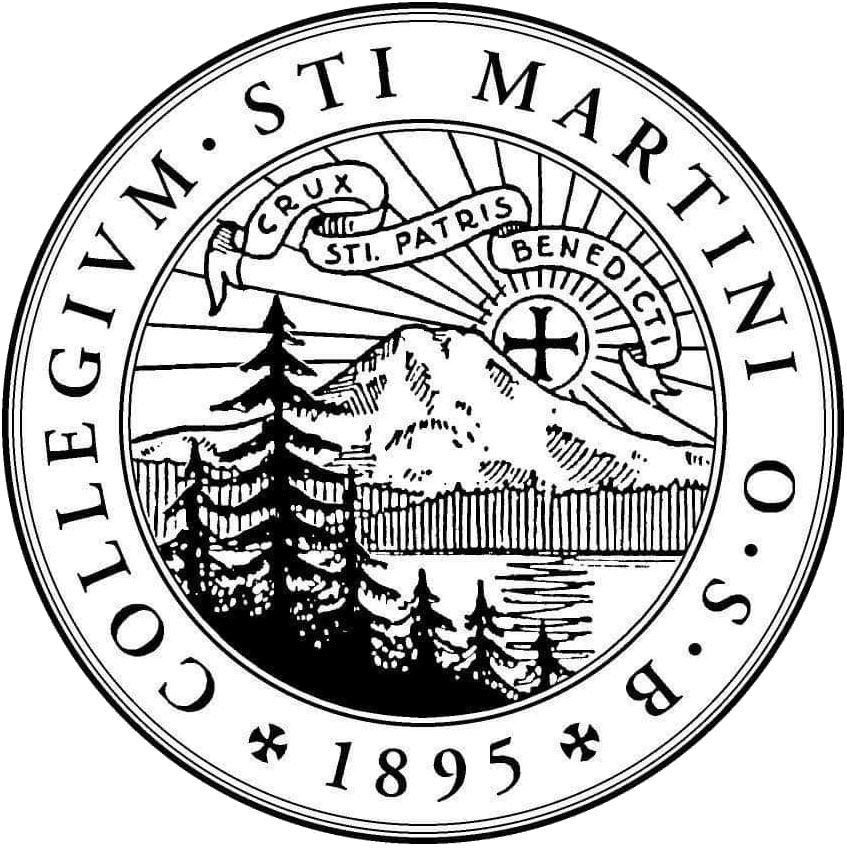
- Former name: Saint Martin's College (1895–2005)
- Motto: "Think with heart"
- Type: Private university
- Established: 1895; 131 years ago
- Religious affiliation: Roman Catholic (Benedictine)
- President: Bill Brownsberger
- Students: 1,387 (fall 2024)
- Undergraduates: 1,186 (fall 2024)
- Postgraduates: 201 (fall 2024)
- Location: Lacey, Washington, United States
- Campus: Suburban, 380 acres (1.5 km^{2})
- Colors: (Red, white, and black)
- Nickname: Saints
- Website: stmartin.edu

Saint Martin's University is a private Benedictine university in Lacey, Washington. It was founded in 1895 as a boys' boarding school run by the monks of St. Martin's Abbey, Washington. Saint Martin's began offering college-level courses in 1900 and became a degree-granting institution in 1940. The college became coeducational in 1965. In 2005, it changed its name from Saint Martin's College to Saint Martin's University. The abbey is on the campus grounds and some members of the monastic community serve as professors.

== History ==
Saint Martin's patron saint is Saint Martin of Tours, a fourth-century monk and missionary. The university and its founder, Saint Martin's Abbey, sit on 300 acres (1.2 km^{2}) of woodlands, trees, rocks, and meandering trails. The site was selected in 1894 by Abbot Bernard Locnikar of Saint John's Abbey, Collegeville, Minnesota, which was the mother abbey of St. Martin's Abbey. At a public auction on April 21, 1894, the wooded parcel that would become the Saint Martin's campus was purchased for $6,920.

Work began on Saint Martin's first building in January 1895. By late summer, a four-story structure housing both the school and a monastery was completed. The school at that time offered preparatory classes for boys, plus commercial and classical education for older boys and young men. Boarding students who came from outside of town also were housed in the campus' one large building. Today, that structure is referred to as Old Main and continues to house many of the university's classrooms and offices.

=== Presidents ===
- 1955–1959 Damian Glenn
- 1959–1964 Dunstan Curtis
- 1964–1971 Michael Feeney
- 1971–1975 Matthew Naumes
- 1975–1980 John Scott
- 1980–1984 John Ishii
- 1984–2005 David Spangler
- 2005–2008 Douglas Astolfi
- 2008–2008 David Spangler (interim)
- 2009–2022 Roy F. Heynderickx
- 2022–2023 Jennifer Bonds-Raacke
- 2023–2024 Kilian Malvey and Roy F. Henderickx as interim co-presidents
- 2024– Bill Brownsberger

== Academics ==
The college offers 28 baccalaureate programs and fourteen graduate degree programs. The university offers programs and courses at Joint Base Lewis-McChord and Centralia College.

=== Colleges and schools ===
- College of Arts and Sciences
- College of Education and Counseling
- Hal and Inge Marcus School of Engineering
- School of Business

== Sister schools ==
Saint Martin's has agreements of cooperation with four Korean universities; Sogang University, Konkuk University, Cheongju University and Sangmyung University. Saint Martin's also has sister universities in Japan (including Mukogawa Women's University and Reitaku University), three in China (including Shanghai Maritime University), and one in Taiwan (Chung Shan Medical University).

== Student life ==
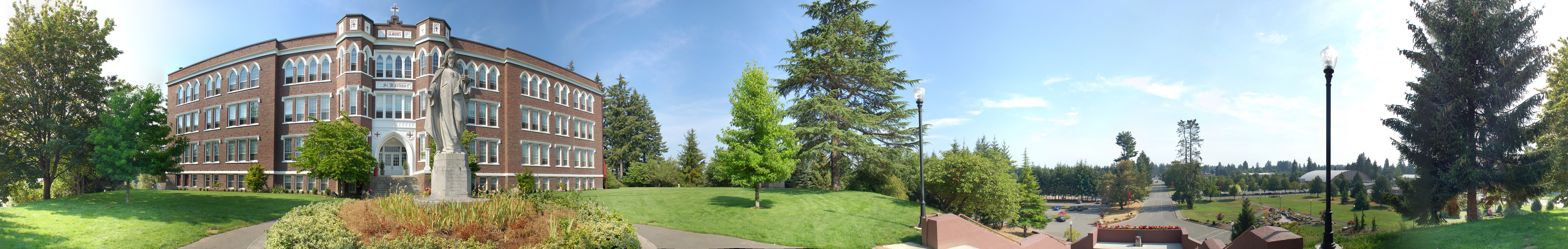
180° panorama on the campus of Saint Martin's University, Lacey, Washington on a sunny August afternoon.

=== Sustainability and technology ===
In the fall semester, 2012, a new 22,000+ square foot engineering building, Cebula Hall, opened. The Learning Garden was started at SMU in 2010.

== Athletics ==
The school's sports teams participate in the NCAA's Great Northwest Athletic Conference at the Division II level. The women's basketball team qualified for the NCAA Division II tournament in 1992 and 2008. In the 1940s and 1950s, Saint Martin's had a men's college football team and a boys' high school football team, which won the Washington Class A championship. In the 1990s, the name of the mascot was almost changed to the Ravens. In 2008, the men's basketball team defeated Division I Colorado State Rams men's basketball, making it Saint Martin's first major publicized victory over a D-1 opponent. In 2009, the Men's Soccer team seized the first team title in any sport for Saint Martin's University, winning the Great Northwest Athletic Conference.

== Notable people ==
=== Alumni ===
- Jill Lannan, brigadier general
- Kyle Sokol, bass guitarist for Rude Squad
- Baseball players Justin Leone and Dick Ward
- Mike Thibault, NBA and WNBA coach

=== Faculty ===
- Amanie Abdelmessih, mechanical engineer (1997–2002)
- David Price, anthropologist
