= Belmont Abbey, North Carolina =

Catholic abbey and basilica in North Carolina, US

The Minor Basilica and Abbey of Mary Help of Christians The Abbey of Belmont
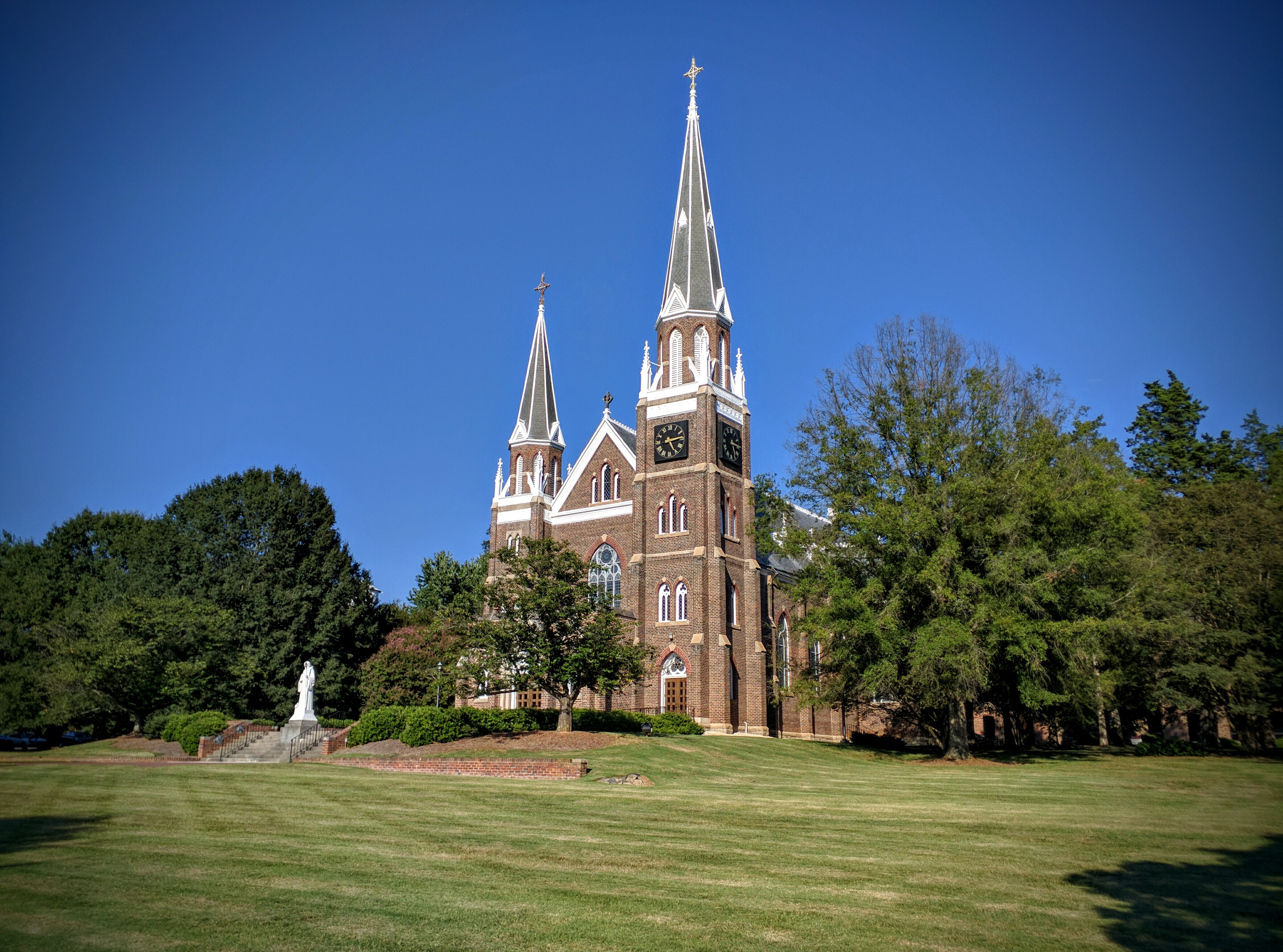
- The Abbey Basilica in 2009

- Location within North Carolina Location within the United States

Monastery information
- Full name: Abbey Basilica of Mary, Help of Christians
- Order: Benedictines
- Established: April 1876
- Mother house: Saint Vincent Archabbey
- Dedication: Mary, Help of Christians
- Diocese: Charlotte
- Controlled churches: Cathedral Basilica of St. Mary

People
- Founders: Dom Herman Wolfe, O.S.B.
- Abbot: The Rt. Rev. Placid Solari, O.S.B.
- Important associated figures: Abbot-Bishop Leo Haid, O.S.B.

Architecture
- Status: active
- Heritage designation: National Register of Historic Places
- Style: Gothic Revival

Site
- Location: Belmont, North Carolina, United States
- Coordinates: 35.2613°N 81.0438°W
- Website: www.belmontabbey.org

- Belmont Abbey Cathedral
- U.S. National Register of Historic Places
- NRHP reference No.: 73001343
- Added to NRHP: April 11, 1973

Belmont Abbey is a Catholic Benedictine monastery and in Belmont, North Carolina. Home to the Abbey Basilica of Mary Help of Christians, the abbey was listed on the National Register of Historic Places in 1973. It is administered by the American-Cassinese Benedictine Congregation and the abbey monks administer Belmont Abbey College.

Pope Leo XIII officially declared the monastery an abbey on December 19, 1884. Pope Pius XII declared Mary Help of Christians its patroness via his decree Perfugium Rebus on December 5, 1957. Pope John Paul II raised the shrine to the status of minor basilica via the pontifical decree Sacras Ædes on July 27, 1998.

== History ==
The Catholic priest, Father Jeremiah O'Connell O.S.B. was a Christian missionary who had built Saint Mary's College in Columbia, South Carolina, but it had been destroyed during the American Civil War. In 1876 he bought the 500-acre former Caldwell farm and donated it to the Benedictines of Saint Vincent Archabbey in Latrobe, Pennsylvania in hopes they would establish an educational institution in North Carolina. Under the direction of Abbot Boniface Wimmer of St. Vincent, the Benedictines set about to establish a monastery and college. The monks constructed the buildings from red clay.

Pope Leo XIII issued a decree on December 19, 1884, raising the priory monastery to an abbey, under the patronage of Mary Help of Christians, and Fr Leo Haid was elected the first abbot, a position he held until his death in 1924. In July 1886, the first three novices professed vows and an alumnus of the college became a novice. That same year, Haid founded a seminary at Belmont. On February 4, 1888, he was appointed Vicar Apostolic of North Carolina and was consecrated bishop at the Baltimore Cathedral by Cardinal James Gibbons on July 1, 1888, becoming the first American abbot-bishop.

In May 1891 the Grotto of Our Lady of Lourdes was dedicated as a pilgrimage shrine by Abbot Haid. Katharine Drexel, a benefactor of the monastery and college, visited Belmont Abbey in 1904.

=== Territorial abbey ===
From 1910 through 1977, Belmont Abbey was a territorial abbey, exercising some functions of a diocese. It had responsibility for parishes in the North Carolina counties of Gaston, Catawba, Cleveland, Burke, Lincoln, McDowell, Polk, and Rutherford. In 1944, its territory, except for Gaston County, was given to the Diocese of Raleigh. Pope Pius XII declared Mary Help of Christians the abbey's patroness via his decree Perfugium Rebus on December 5, 1957.

In July 1960, Gaston County too was placed under the Diocese of Raleigh. In 1977, its status as a territorial abbey was suppressed under the Diocese of Charlotte.

The coat of arms of the former Territorial Abbey of Mary Help of Christians (Belmont Abbey).

=== Abbey Basilica of Mary Help of Christians ===
Construction began on the Abbey Church of Mary Help of Christians in 1892 and was completed in 1894. The Abbey Church was dedicated April 11, 1894. The church is a large cruciform plan, Gothic Revival style brick church. It has a steep gable roof and the front facade features two towers of unequal size. Pope John Paul II raised the shrine to the status of minor basilica via the pontifical decree Sacras Ædes on July 27, 1998. The church features a baptismal font carved from a stone upon which African American slaves were once sold on the North Carolina market.

=== Saint Mary's College ===
Father Herman Wolfe, O.S.B. and two students arrived in April 1876. The first students graduated in 1878. In April 1886 the state of North Carolina issued Saint Mary's College a charter authorizing the abbey/school to grant degrees. Two-thirds of the College Building was destroyed by fire in 1900. Rebuilding began immediately. In 1913 Saint Mary's adopted the Belmont Abbey name.

On June 20, 2011, Belmont Abbey College broke ground for a residences for female students with or expecting children—regardless of religious affiliation—that can hold 15 babies, 15 women (who can stay for up to two years), and 8 toddlers at a time, with a shared living room, dining room, and laundry room. The residence, called "Room at the Inn" is operated by a Charlotte, North Carolina-based maternity and aftercare center of the same name.

In May 2020, the college announced it was starting a nursing program to address the continuing healthcare needs in Gaston County.

On July 14, 1993, the central campus was entered on the National Register of Historic Places as the "Belmont Abbey National Historic District."

== Present day ==
The abbey is the motherhouse to Saint Leo Abbey in St. Leo, Florida, as well as Mary Mother of the Church Abbey in Richmond, Virginia. The monks also are the benefactors of Belmont Abbey College, a four-year Catholic liberal arts school. As of 2020, there are about twenty monks at Belmont Abbey.

== See also ==
- List of Catholic cathedrals in the United States
