= Territorial abbey =

Religious community

The coat of arms of a territorial abbot are distinguished by a green galero with twelve tassels and a gold crozier with a veil attached

A territorial abbey (or territorial abbacy) is a particular church of the Catholic Church comprising defined territory which is not part of a diocese but surrounds an abbey or monastery whose abbot or superior functions as ordinary for all Catholics and parishes in the territory. Such an abbot is called a territorial abbot or abbot nullius diœceseos (abbreviated abbot nullius and Latin for "abbot of no diocese"). A territorial abbot thus differs from an ordinary abbot, who exercises authority only within the monastery's walls or to monks or canons who have taken their vows there. A territorial abbot is equivalent to a diocesan bishop in Catholic canon law.

While most belong to the Latin Church, and usually to the Benedictine or Cistercian Orders, there is one Eastern Catholic territorial abbey: the Italo-Albanian Greek Catholic Abbey of Grottaferrata. The closest equivalent in the Eastern Orthodox Church would be a stauropegion (e.g. most famously, Mount Athos).

== History ==
Though territorial (like other) abbots are elected by the monks of their abbey, a territorial abbot can only receive the abbatial blessing and be installed under a mandate from the pope, just as a bishop cannot be ordained and installed as ordinary of a diocese without such a mandate.

After the Second Vatican Council, more emphasis has been placed on the unique nature of the episcopacy and on the traditional organization of the church into dioceses under bishops. Abbeys nullius have been phased out in favour of the erection of new dioceses or the absorption of the territory into an existing diocese. A few ancient territorial abbeys still exist in Europe, and there is one in Korea.

== Present territorial abbeys ==
There are eleven remaining territorial abbeys, as listed by the Holy See in the Annuario Pontificio:

Austria

- Wettingen-Mehrerau

Hungary

- Pannonhalma

Italy

- Monte Oliveto Maggiore
- Montevergine
- Santa Maria di Grottaferrata
- Santissima Trinità di Cava de’ Tirreni
- Abbey of Saint Scholastica, Subiaco (lost most of its territory to neighbouring dioceses)
- Monte Cassino (lost most of its territory to the Diocese of Sora-Aquino-Pontecorvo)

Korea

- Tŏkwon (덕원), North Korea
  - Tŏkwon (currently the only territorial abbey outside Europe) has been vacant for many years. The Abbot of Waegwan is its present apostolic administrator. It has not been united with any Korean diocese on account of the effective vacancy of the dioceses of North Korea and the lack of effective jurisdiction exercised by the Church based in South Korea.

Switzerland

- Saint-Maurice d’Agaune
- Einsiedeln

== Other historical territorial abbeys ==
Historically there have been more, such as:

=== Americas ===
- in North America :
  - Belmont Abbey – Mary, Help of Christians, which was the jurisdiction governing half of North Carolina from 1910 until 1960, when it lost its last piece of territory. The jurisdiction as a territorial abbey was formally suppressed in 1977, and the house is now a normal monastery located within the Diocese of Charlotte.
  - St. Peter-Muenster, which from 1921 until 1998 served a remote area of Saskatchewan, Canada. The abbey still exists as a normal monastery, but its territorial jurisdiction was absorbed by the Diocese of Saskatoon.

=== Asia ===
- in Southeast Asia:
  - Abbacy Nullius of Cebu (1565-1578) - an abbacy vere nullius dioecesis [Eng. "of no diocese"], which is a kind of abbacy where the religious superior has jurisdiction over the clergy and laity of a district or territory which forms no part whatever of any diocese, was established in 1565 by the Augustinian missionaries to the Philippines who came with the Legazpi expedition to evangelize the natives of the islands. The Augustinians were led by their superior, Andrés de Urdaneta, who consequently became the first prelate of Cebu. The territory of the abbacy covered the entirety of the Spanish East Indies which included the Philippine Islands and other Pacific Islands. The abbacy ceased to exist with the establishment of the Diocese of Manila in 1578 which took over the same territory.
