= Christine Vladimiroff =

American Catholic nun and prioress (1940–2014)

Sister Christine Vladimiroff OSB

Personal life
- Born: January 12, 1940 Erie, Pennsylvania, U.S.
- Died: September 25, 2014 (aged 74) Mount Saint Benedict Monastery, Erie, Pennsylvania
- Resting place: Trinity Cemetery, Erie, Pennsylvania
- Parent(s): John Vladimiroff and Agnes (Olszewski) Vladimiroff
- Education: St. Benedict Academy (Erie, Pennsylvania); Doctor of Philosophy, Universidad Internacional in Mexico City, Mexico

Religious life
- Religion: Roman Catholic
- Denomination: Order of Saint Benedict
- Ordination: 1962

Senior posting
- Predecessor: Joan Chittister

Sister Christine Vladimiroff, OSB (January 12, 1940 – September 25, 2014) was the prioress of the Benedictine Sisters of Erie from 1998 to 2010. In 2004, she was also president of the Leadership Conference of Women Religious, USA.

== Formative years and family ==
Born in Erie, Pennsylvania on January 12, 1940, Christine Vladimiroff was the oldest child of John Vladimiroff and Agnes (Olszewski) Vladimiroff. She graduated from St. Ann's Parish School and St. Benedict Academy in Erie, and then entered the Benedictine Sisters of Erie in 1957, where she took her final vows in 1962.

She subsequently pursued higher education studies, first at Mercyhurst University in Erie, which led to her earning her Doctor of Philosophy degree at the Universidad Internacional in Mexico City, Mexico, and on to postgraduate work at Fordham University, Georgetown University, Edinboro University, St. Bonaventure University, and Gannon University.

== Career ==
Early in her professional life, Vladimiroff was employed as an educator at the elementary, secondary, and college levels, as well as an administrator at those same levels. In 1981, she was appointed as the multicultural coordinator for the Diocese of Cleveland; from 1983 to 1991, she served as secretary of education for the Cleveland diocese.

In 1991, she was appointed as president and chief executive officer of the Second Harvest national food bank network in Chicago, Illinois, and continued in that role until 1998, when she was elected as prioress of her religious community. In 1997, she was appointed co-chair of the Advisory Committee on Food Security by the Clinton administration.

Vladimiroff celebrated her golden jubilee in 2009.

After completing her term as prioress of her order in 2010, Vladimiroff was appointed as the executive director of St. Benedict Education Center, which offered language instruction and job training to refugees and others in need of assistance.

=== Other leadership roles ===
Vladimiroff was a member of the leadership team of the Leadership Conference of Women Religious from 2003 to 2006 and served as the organization's president from 2004 to 2005. She then served as president of the Conference of American Benedictine Prioresses from 2009 to 2013. In addition, she was a delegate to the International Organization of Benedictine Women, Communio Internationalis Benedictinarum.

== 2001 Vatican refusal ==
On June 26, 2001, Vladimiroff called the members of her order together to announce at she would refuse a directive from the Vatican to prohibit Sister Joan Chittister, a member of the Benedictine Order for half a century and feminist who had become famous for her advocacy on behalf of women who wanted to be ordained as priests, from attending a conference on women's ordination in Dublin, Ireland. Chittister went on to speak at that conference, and, although both nuns were threatened with disciplinary action, neither was expelled from the church. Their actions generated "worldwide headlines and more than 1,000 letters and emails from across the globe," the majority of which "hailed the women as symbols of conscience against the Vatican's escalating moves to control dissent."

The announcement followed months of prayer vigils, periods of fasting, and meetings that Vladimiroff held with the members of her order to debate the directive that had been issued in March of that year by a department in the Vatican that was responsible for oversight of religious communities across the globe. Vladimiroff had also even traveled to Rome in May, "accompanied by two Benedictine experts in canon law, to argue that Chittister's appearance would not flout rules against 'teaching against the authority of the pope,'" but was unsuccessful in convincing Vatican officials to reverse their decision. Following her announcement to her order, she issued her own letter, informing the Vatican "that the Benedictine idea of authority and obedience differed from 'that which is being used by the Vatican to exert power and control and prompt a false sense of unity inspired by fear."

On February 21, 2007, the Erie City Council issued special proclamations recognizing women religious, including Vladimiroff, in three Erie area communities, for making a difference in Erie through their respective ministries.

== Illness, death and interment ==
In declining health during her final years, Vladimiroff died at the age of seventy-four at Mount Saint Benedict Monastery in Erie on September 25, 2014. Her funeral services were held at the monastery on September 29 and 30. Her remains were then interred in Trinity Cemetery on October 1.

== Awards and other honors ==
Named a Distinguished Daughter of Pennsylvania by the Governor of Pennsylvania in 2013, Vladimiroff was the recipient of multiple awards throughout her professional and religious life, including the:

- Adrian Dominican Educational Leadership Award, Barry University, Miami, Florida (1990);
- Catholic Woman of Achievement Award, College of St. Elizabeth, Convent Station, New Jersey (1997);
- Distinguished Alumna and Sister Carolyn Hermann Award for Outstanding Community Service, Mercyhurst University (1997);
- Leadership Award, Second Harvest National Network (1998);
- Archbishop Oscar Romero Award, Mercyhurst University (1999);
- Distinguished Pennsylvanian, Gannon University (2001); and the
- Hunger Hero Award, Bread for the World (2004).
