= Mary Lou Kownacki =

Nun, peace activist, and writer (1941–2023)

Sister Mary Lou Kownacki
- Born: November 29, 1941; Erie, Pennsylvania, U.S.
- Died: January 6, 2023 (aged 81); Erie, Pennsylvania
- Education: Antioch University (B.A., 1977; M.A., 1979)
- Occupations: Nun, activist, writer
- Organization: Benedictine Sisters of Erie

Sister Mary Lou Kownacki (November 29, 1941 – January 6, 2023) was a Roman Catholic Benedictine nun, peace activist, and writer. She was a close friend and collaborator of fellow nun and activist Joan Chittister. Kownacki was arrested 13 times over the course of her life for activism-related offenses.

== Life ==
Kownacki was born in Erie to Polish-American residents Mary (nee Krzyzan) and Edward Kownacki. She was raised in Erie, where she attended St. Benedict Academy. As a student, she often got into trouble and was once nearly expelled. That she remained in school was credited to her father's pleas with school officials, and her ability as a basketball player on the school's team. In her biography, Kownacki wrote that at age 16 she saw an angel in her bedroom after returning home from a party. She confessed to it that she thought she was making a "real mess" of her life, and the angel told her to "go to the convent". Despite believing she was "not the type," Kownacki accepted the idea and joined the vocation club.

She entered the Benedictine Sisters of Erie in 1959, at age 17. As a novice, she became interested in peace activism while reading All Quiet on the Western Front. Over time, and after reading Christian authors such as Daniel Berrigan and Thomas Merton, Kownacki developed a belief "in the complete incompatibility of Christianity and war". In 1965, she made her final profession, taking the name Sister Mary Sebastian. Kownacki worked as an educator in Erie, Sharon, Oil City, and Fryburg for her first few years as a sister.

In 1967, Kownacki took a year away from the priory, after being "shaken by the implications" of the assassination of Robert F. Kennedy. During her year away, she worked as a reporter for the Erie Daily Times. After returning, she sought to found the PAX Center, a "quasi-monastic peace and justice center" in Erie; this idea came to fruition in 1970. The center provided services to the public, serving as a soup kitchen and women's shelter. It also hosted a store "selling goods from Third World artists and craftspersons," and published a newsletter about issues related to peace and justice.

In 1971 and 1972, Kownacki returned to her reporter position at the Erie Daily Times. In 1972, she was a member of the Harrisburg Defense Committee, a group which raised funds for the trial of antiwar activist Phillip Berrigan. That same year, she was arrested for the first time, after trespassing to pray at the trial of the Harrisburg Seven. After spending almost a week in jail, she was released on April 2, Easter Sunday. In 1973, Kownacki and two other women from Erie were arrested for praying at the White House as part of a protest against the bombing of Cambodia. In 1976, she was arrested following a sit-in at the Rockwell International offices in Pittsburgh. Kownacki also joined Pax Christi in the 1970s, following the establishment of a branch in the United States. In the late 1970s, Kownacki studied Peace Studies at Antioch University, where she earned a B.A. (1977) and an M.A. (1979).

In 1980, Kownacki organized a week-long series of anti-war demonstrations at the Pentagon, in honor of the 1500th anniversary of Benedictism. She served as national coordinator of Benedictines for Peace from 1980 until 1985. In 1982, she was part of a group of a dozen nuns, including three other nuns from Erie, who were arrested for holding a prayer vigil in the Capitol rotunda for the 1980 murders of four Catholics missionaries in El Salvador. In 1985, she organized Peace Pentecost, another anti-war demonstration in Washington, D.C., during which 270 of 1,500 participants were arrested for trespassing to pray in off-limits areas. Later that year, she was arrested again for trespassing during a protest at a government atomic weapons testing site in Nevada. She served as a national coordinator at Pax Christi from 1985 until 1991, during which she voiced support for the anti-nuclear movement.

From 1992 until 2002, Kownacki was the director of development and communications for the Benedictine Sisters of Erie. In 1992, she founded Benetvision Publishing. In 1995, Kownacki founded the Benedicta Riepp Neighborhood Art House in Erie, which hosts after-school and summer arts programs.

From 1991 until 2002, she served as executive director for the Alliance for International Monasticism. In 2008, she released her autobiography, A Monk in the Inner City: The ABCs of a Spiritual Journey. In 2012, she established Monasteries of the Heart, an online monastic community. In 2017, she attended the Women's March in Washington, D.C.

Kownacki died at age 81, on January 6, 2023, after three years with uveal cancer. Her funeral was held on January 10.

== Awards ==
- Alexis de Tocqueville Society Award for outstanding community service (2004)
- Independent Publisher Book Award (2005), for Between Two Souls: Conversations with Ryokan
- Manhattan Institute Social Entrepreneurship Award (2006)
- Pax Christi USA Teacher of Peace (2006)
- Romero Award (2013), from Mercyhurst University

== Publications ==
- Peace Is Our Calling: Contemporary Monasticism and the Peace Movement (1981)
- Kownacki, Mary Lou (1992). The Fire of Peace: A Prayer Book. Pax Christi USA. ISBN 978-0-9666285-7-9.
- The Nonviolent Moment (2002)
- Kownacki, Mary Lou (2004). Between Two Souls: Conversations with Ryōkan. Wm. B. Eerdmans Publishing. ISBN 978-0-8028-2809-5.
- Kownacki, Mary Lou (2008). A Monk in the Inner City: The ABCs of a Spiritual Journey. Orbis Books. ISBN 978-1-60833-050-8.
- Kownacki, Mary Lou (2012). Old Monk. Benetvision. ISBN 978-1-890890-84-1.

=== Poetry collections ===
- The Blue Heron and Thirty-Seven Other Miracles
- Prayers for a New Millennium
