= Pauline Fréchette =

Canadian writer

Soeur Marie-Pauline
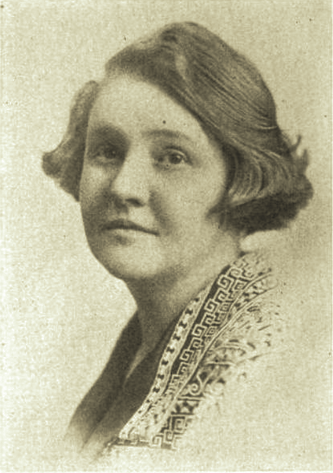
- Fréchette in 1925

Personal life
- Born: Pauline Fréchette; 16 October 1889 Montreal, Canada
- Died: 5 January 1943 (aged 53) Launay, France
- Spouse: Joseph Azarie Handfield (m. 1910; div. 1926)
- Parent: Louis-Honoré Fréchette (father)
- Education: Villa Maria Convent
- Other name: Pauline Fréchette-Handfield
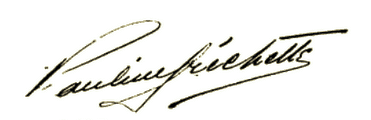
- Signature

Religious life
- Religion: Roman Catholic
- Denomination: Benedictine Sisters of Jesus Crucified
- Institute: l'Institut de Jésus Crucifié
- Profession: writer

Pauline Fréchette (after marriage, Fréchette-Handfield; religious name, Soeur Marie-Pauline; 16 October 1889 – 5 January 1943) was a Canadian poet, dramatist, journalist, and lecturer. After marriage and divorce in Canada, she removed to France and became a Roman Catholic religious sister.

== Early life and education ==
Marie-Emma-Pauline-Adine ("Pauline") Frechette was born in Montreal, Canada on 16 October 1889. She was the youngest daughter of Louis-Honoré Fréchette and Marie-Emma (Beaudry) Fréchette (died 1922). Her siblings from this marriage included, Jean-Baptiste-Louis-Joseph Fréchette, Marie-Jeanne-Emma Fréchette, Marie-Desiree-Louise-Alexandrine Fréchette, and Charles-Auguste-Jean-Louis Fréchette.

She received her education at Villa Maria Convent, C.N.D., whence she graduated in 1908.

== Career ==
In addition to the volume of verse, Tu m'as donné le plus doux rêve, with a preface by Hon. Gonzalve Desaulniers, she was the author of a work in prose entitled L’Art d'être une bonne Mère, which was highly praised in medical circles and was honored by a long study from Leon Berthaut, of Paris. Many of Fréchette's poems were set to music in Montreal and in Paris. She was fond of travel and gave the press racy descriptions of her journeys. She was frequently called upon to give public readings of her poems. She resided at Ville de Léry, Chateauguay County, Quebec, near Montreal. Fréchette published a collection of her father's works under the title of Centmorceaux choisis de Louis Fréchette, with a preface by Senator L. O. David.

The Duke of Bauffremont, who specialized in French-Canadian literature, said of Fréchette, "She does not lack of inspiration and originality. These verses are from a poet, a real poet. Poetry does not consist in putting rhymes in line and in using rare words: poetry is the way of feeling and thinking and in the way of seeing things--qualities that Mrs. Fréchette possesses in a supreme degree." Henri d'Arles wrote an extensive criticism of her volume of verses. In Nos Poetes, of Paris, he stated:— "One finds in Mrs. Fréchette's works the sincerity of inspiration and the sensibility which are so fascinating in Louis Fréchette's poetry. It is like a charming inheritance which the author of 'Tu m'as donné le plus doux rêve' has put in value."

== Personal life ==
On 22 September 1910, in Montreal, she married Dr. Joseph Azarie Handfield (1873–1935), a physician of Montreal. In 1926, he petitioned for a dissolution of marriage.

Pauline Fréchette, now Soeur (Sister) Marie-Pauline, died at the l'Institut de Jésus Crucifié, in Launay, France, 5 January 1943.

== Selected works ==
- L'art d'être une bonne mère: notions d'hygiène, de physiologie et de psychologie pour les jeunes mères, 1922
- L’Art d'être une bonne Mère, 1923
- Centmorceaux choisis de Louis Fréchette, 1924
- Tu m'as donné le plus doux rêve, 1924
