= Joe Ramirez =

American visual artist

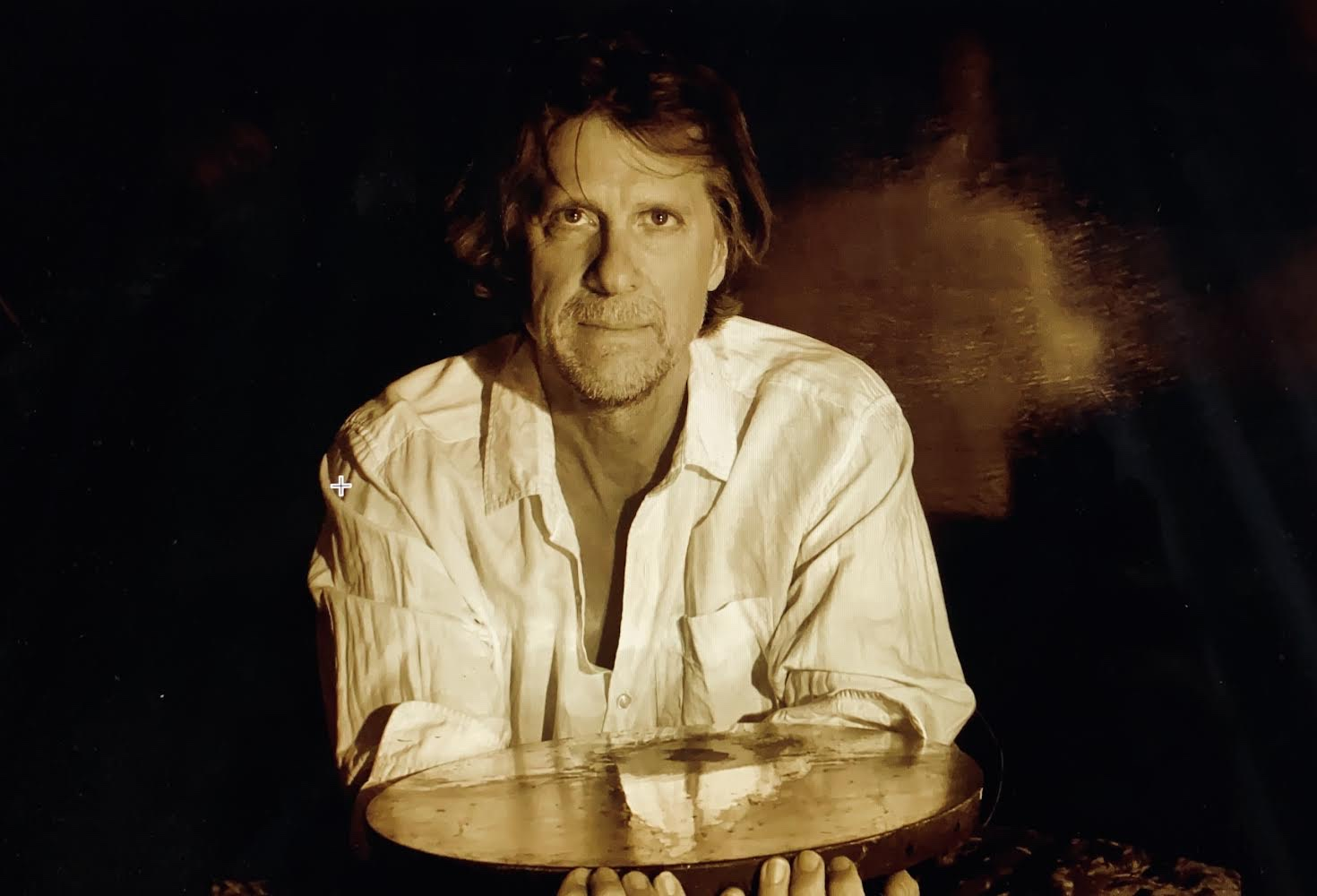
- Joe Ramirez, 2023
- Born: Joseph Ramirez; San Francisco, California, U.S.
- Notable work: The Gold Projections

Joe Ramirez is an American visual artist known for his work at the intersection of painting and moving image, which is called The Gold Projections. Bringing together processes from both domains, he projects his films on to gilded discs to create "fresco cinema". Since 2007, he has lived and worked in Berlin.

== Early life and education ==
Ramirez was born and raised in San Francisco. He studied painting and film at the Art Institute of Chicago and sculpture at the Royal College of Art in London. During his time in Chicago, he immersed himself in the aesthetics of Andy Warhol's Screen Tests and Andrei Tarkovsky films. The Sacrifice (1986 film) in particular had a large influence and led him to travel to Moscow to study the Russian more closely, shortly before the 1989 revolutions. In 1994, Ramirez directed Viridian based on poems by Paul Hoover (poet), starring Diane Weyermann. He caught the attention of American film critic Jonathan Rosenbaum, who remarked that he weaved meditative moods and reflections around the marriage of lonely figures and landscapes, reminding Rosenbaum at times of the best features of Jon Jost.

== Career ==
"I leave it to you whether you want to call this a process of unconsciousness, or of dreaming, or of imagination; whether you think it is related more to painting, or more to photography, or to cinematography, whether it is utterly complex or of the purest simplicity. All I know is: there's nothing like it."

— Wim Wenders, A Logic of Dreams

Ramirez began his career as a fresco painter, spending seven years restoring St. Scholastica's Monastery Chapel for the Benedictine Sisters of Chicago. When the Sistine Chapel was being renovated, he had the rare chance to see the ceiling frescos by Michelangelo up close. Inspired by this experience, Ramirez worked for many years, fusing hand-tooled surfaces, painting, and cinema into the language of dreams, which he titled The Gold Projections. Art historian Mark Gisbourne, in an essay titled "The Alchemical Presence", described the projections as an expanded alchemical imagination grounded in a highly personal and original aesthetic through Ramirez's use of the relationship of light as material and material as light.

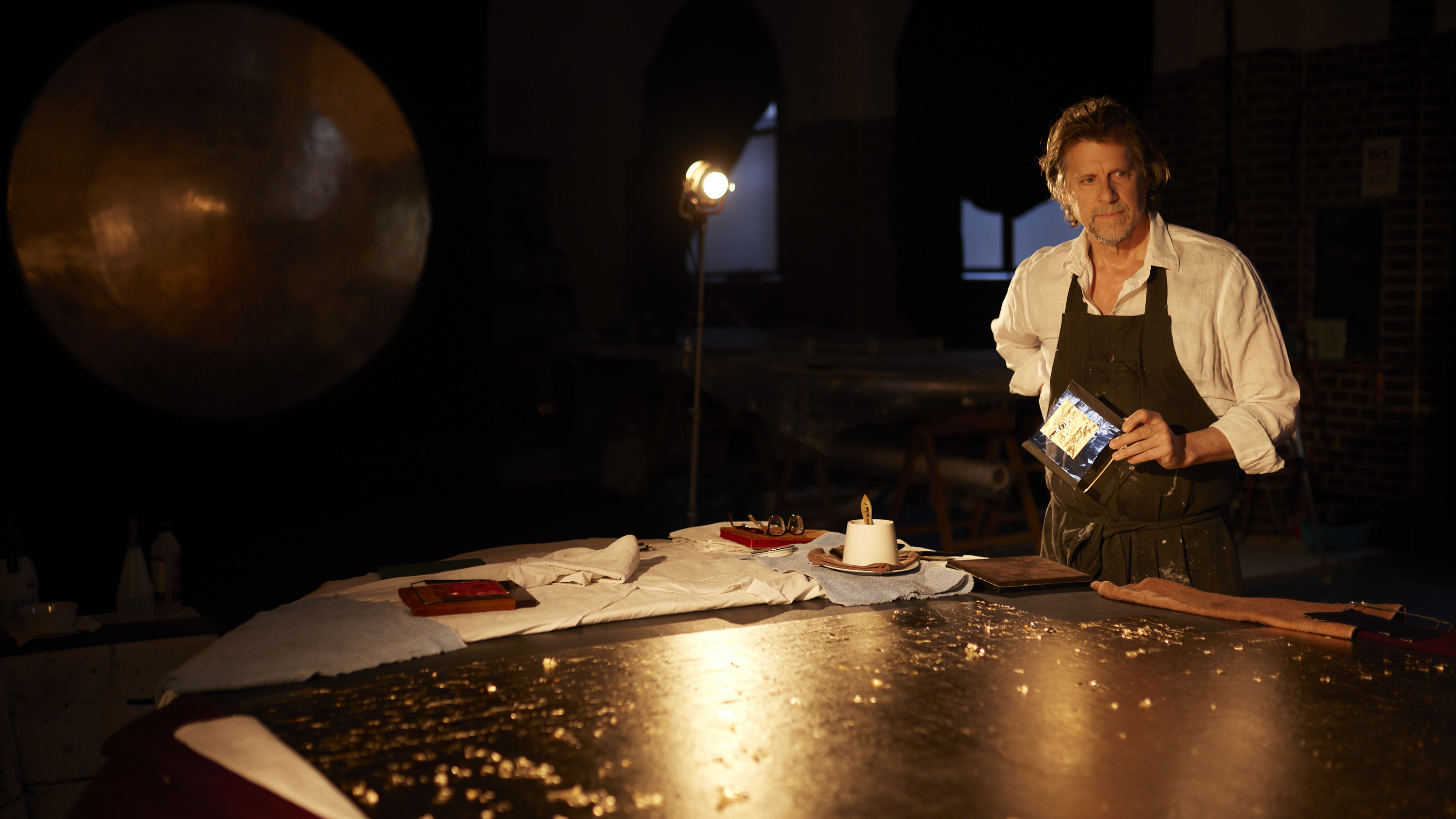
Joe Ramirez, 2023

In February 2017, he debuted The Gold Projections with the film Somnium, produced by Wim Wenders, at the Kulturforum during the 67th Berlinale. Somnium was shown to the public for a second time at the Gemäldegalerie as part Alchemy. The Great Art, a collaborative exhibition with the Getty Museum in April 2017. The curator of the show, Dr. Jörg Völlnagel, said Ramirez opened up a "whole new way of seeing", positioning him in the tradition of Gordon Matta Clark's disruptive use of space and James Turrell's feel for the chromatics of light.

The Pierre Boulez Saal hosted the third and most recent public exhibition to date in August 2019. All three installations featured the film Somnium, which was "narrated" by Patti Smith, who compared it to the monolith in 2001: A Space Odyssey (film). The third exhibition also featured the film Vermilion. Artist and film maker Louis Benassi was struck by the intensity of the projected light as it reflects and fluctuates between opacity and translucency. Ramirez himself sees The Gold Projections as trails into a sublime landscape of dreams that is about "breathing light".

"It’s a chance to let go ... I am a painter; I come at it as film through painting ... I remember a long time ago I saw Pollock’s Lavender Mist at MOMA and I had never seen the original and had seen it in books for years. But, when I stood in front of it, the thing was just moving and breathing in every direction and the colour harmony is a total masterpiece. That’s the feeling that I really want."

— Joe Ramirez, Joe Ramirez's exhibition spun gold at Frank Gehry's Pierre Boulez Saal in Berlin

In December 2020, it was announced that Ramirez was working on his next Gold Projections film, titled The Fourth Garden
