= Clown ministry =

Christian ministry involving clowns

Clown ministry is a type of Christian ministry involving clowns. It is primarily found in North American churches.

== Theology ==
Participants in clown ministry have pointed to multiple rationale to explain and justify clown ministry. One such rationale is the idea of foolishness for Christ, in which social expectations are subverted in order to further Christian ideals or proselytism.

== Activities ==
Clown ministry can take multiple forms, including taking part in Sunday services, visits to nursing homes, hospitals, and prisons, and appearance in festivals and parades. Clowns involved often take part in traditional clown activities, such as creating balloon animals and performing skits, although often using Christian symbolism, stories, or themes.

== History ==
Clown ministry largely dates back to the 1970s and early 1980s, with clowns such as Floyd Shaffer and the publication of Janet Litherland's The Clown Ministry Handbook in 1982. However, it retains influences from historical European tropes such as the holy Fool, "the country bumpkin, Commedia dell'arte figures, and the court jester". In the late 1970s, Franklin & Marshall College in Pennsylvania began hosting the National Clown, Mime, Puppet and Dance Ministry workshop. Their July 1983 iteration saw more than 700 people attend the week-long workshop.

In 1983, the Associated Press estimated that thousands of clown ministry groups had been founded in the United States since 1973, and that 50,000 Americans were involved with a clown ministry group. Spin-off groups, such as those using pantomime in ministry, also formed.

The 1980s and 90s saw clown ministry groups formed at churches, on college campuses, and, in the case of the Benedictine Sisters of Erie, Pennsylvania, religious communities.
