= Benedictine Sisters of Elk County =

Benedictine monastery in Marienstadt, Pennsylvania

Coordinates: 41°25′41.5″N 78°34′10.4″W

The Benedictines Sisters of Elk County were a religious congregation established in Marienstadt, Pennsylvania in 1852 by three sisters from Saint Walburge Abbey in Bavaria. There they established St. Joseph Monastery, the first convent of Benedictine Sisters in North America. They opened a school for girls, St. Benedict Academy, and in 1933 expanded their apostolate into healthcare, becoming the owner and operator of Andrew Kaul Memorial Hospital in St. Marys.

Daughter houses were established in Erie, Pennsylvania (Mount St. Benedict Monastery - 1856), Newark, New Jersey (St. Gertrude Monastery - 1857), and St. Cloud, Minnesota (Saint Benedict's Monastery) which became separate congregations in their own right.

Over time the members of the congregation aged while fewer candidates entered the community; the monastery itself was in need of repair. In January 2014, the 17 nuns remaining voted to dissolve the community. They then dispersed to either assisted living facilities or to some other Benedictine monasteries.

The Benedictines Sisters of Elk County are the foundational community of the Congregation of St. Scholastica, a federation of the monasteries which trace their heritage to St. Joseph Monastery,

== History ==
=== Benedicta Riepp O.S.B. ===
Sybilla Riepp was born in Waal, Bavaria, on June 28, 1825, one of four daughters born to John and Catherine Riepp. Her father was a glassblower. In January 1844, she entered St. Walburg Convent in Eichstätt, Bavaria, and received the name Benedicta. She professed solemn vows on July 9, 1849, at the age of twenty-four. Sister Benedicta taught in the girls’ school of Eichstätt during the eight years she lived there. She also served as novice mistress.

Around 1848, the School Sisters of Notre Dame had settled in Marienstadt (St. Mary's, Pennsylvania); but left the following year to settle elsewhere. Bishop Michael O'Connor of Pittsburgh asked Boniface Wimmer of the Monastery of Saint Vincent in Latrobe to take over the mission at St. Mary's. In 1851, Wimmer, who was originally from Bavaria, sent a request to St. Walburg Convent for sisters to teach the children of German immigrants.

Sister Benedicta was among those who volunteered, and was appointed superior. She and her two companions left from Bremen and sailed from Southampton, arriving in New York, on the steamer Washington, on the evening of July 3, 1852. They reached Saint Vincent Abbey in Latrobe, Pennsylvania on July 8. A family by the name of Head extended hospitality, and after a week's rest, the sisters proceeded to St. Marys, Pennsylvania, arriving on July 22. There they established St. Joseph Monastery, the first convent of Benedictine Sisters in North America.

Two more sisters arrived from Eichstätt the following year. With a small addition added to the convent, the sisters were able to take in a few boarders and orphans. Their food consisted mostly of potatoes, rye bread, buckwheat cakes, and thin soup. There numbers increased, both from local applicants and additional sisters from Eichstätt. In total, St. Walburga's monastery contributed thirteen sisters to the American foundation.

The six years Mother Benedicta spent as Superior at Saint Joseph Monastery in St. Marys were filled with physical hardship and misunderstandings between herself and Prior Wimmer of St. Vincent's. Funds sent by King Ludwig for the convent were redirected toward two mills, one at St. Mary and the second at the priory. As she understood St. Joseph Monastery to be an autonomous Benedictine community under the jurisdiction of the local bishop, she resisted Wimmer's interference in the internal matters of the women's community. He, having been made abbot in 1855, questioned her authority as the Superior of the convents she founded. The dispute over jurisdiction seems to have caused some turmoil in the St. Joseph's community. Nevertheless, her leadership during those years resulted in the establishment of three new foundations: Mount St. Benedict Monastery in Erie, Pennsylvania (1856), St. Gertrude Monastery in Newark, New Jersey (1857), and Saint Benedict's Monastery in St. Cloud, Minnesota (1857). Convents in Covington (1859) and Chicago (1861) branched off from Erie.

In 1857, Mother Benedicta travelled to Europe. She hoped her superiors in Eichstätt and Rome would help her resolve the controversy surrounding the independence of the new convents in North America. As the American congregation was expected to separate from the Motherhouse, she and her companion were no longer considered members of Eichstätt and were not welcomed. They were prevented from traveling to Rome to present her case before the Pope.

Mother Benedicta returned to the United States in 1858, broken in spirit and failing in health. Due to Wimmer's influence, she was no longer welcome in the convents she had founded in the eastern U.S. At the invitation of Mother Willibalda Scherbauer in St. Cloud, she moved to the Minnesota city in the spring of 1858. In 1859, a decree from Rome placed the convents in Erie and Newark under the jurisdiction of their respective ordinaries. On March 15, 1862 Benedicta died of tuberculosis. In 1884, her remains were transferred from St. Cloud to the convent cemetery in St. Joseph.

=== St. Joseph Monastery ===
St. Joseph Monastery was the first Benedictine monastery for women to be founded in the United States. The monastery operated until 2014.

The monastery was founded by Mother Benedicta Riepp, O.S.B., who was sent, along with two companions, from St. Walburga Abbey in Eichstätt, in the Kingdom of Bavaria. They had come at the invitation of Abbot Boniface Wimmer, O.S.B., who had founded the first monastery of the Benedictine monks in the country in Latrobe, Pennsylvania. He determined a need in the small town heavily populated with Bavarian Roman Catholic immigrants for religious presence and support, as well as an opportunity for the nuns to teach the children of these immigrants.

Soon after their arrival, a girls' school was entrusted to them; two years later they took charge of the boys' school. the sisters also taught in the public schools until 1895. At one time the monastery was largely self-sufficient, raising its own crops and livestock. In 1964, Sister Augustine was taught ceramics by Rita Jane (Cassady) Selle, an alumna of St. Benedict's Academy, and started St. Joseph Ceramics and became known for her nativity sets. She continued crafting pieces, which became collectibles, well into her nineties. Author John Schlimm wrote about Sr. Augustine and her work in his book Five Years in Heaven.

==== New foundations ====
Daughter houses were established in Erie, Pennsylvania (Mount St. Benedict Monastery - 1856), Newark, New Jersey (St. Gertrude Monastery - 1857), and St. Cloud, Minnesota (Saint Benedict's Monastery) which became separate congregations in their own right.

==== Andrew Kaul Memorial Hospital ====
From these beginnings, and as the community grew, so too did the mission of the Sisters. They expanded into health care and operated the Andrew Kaul Memorial Hospital in the town. The hospital was created in the aftermath 1918 Influenza epidemic of 1918 by the three daughters of St. Marys businessman Andrew Kaul. They converted the dormant men's Benedictine monastery into a local hospital. It was turned over to the Sisters from St. Joseph's in 1933. In November 1934 a fire destroyed everything but the stone walls. The sisters closed their girls school, St. Benedict's Academy and converted it to a temporary hospital until a new one could be completed in 1941. The sisters owned and operated the hospital until 1978 when it was turned over to a public-not-for -profit corporation.

== Dissolution ==
At its peak between the 1930s and 1950s, the monastery had 125 sisters. In January 2014, it was announced that the 17 nuns, ranging in age from 58 to 91, had voted to dissolve the community. "The closure was prompted by declining health and number of members, combined with outdated facilities, retired Erie Bishop Donald Trautman said. The nuns planned to disperse, some to assisted living facilities, and others to other Benedictine monasteries. In 2018, St. Mary’s Parish reached an agreement with the Benedictine Sisters of Elk County to transfer ownership of their St. Joseph Monastery lands to the parish.

== Legacy ==
The only extant writings of Mother Benedicta are fourteen letters written between the years 1852 and 1861. These letters reveal her conviction that her Benedictine vocation was a privilege.

- Three federations of Benedictine women in North America, totaling about two thousand members in the early 2000s, remain the legacy of Benedictine Sisters of Elk County.
- The Benedicta Arts Center at the College of St. Benedict in St. Cloud, Minnesota is named for Mother Benedicta Riepp.
- The Benedicta Riepp Award is presented by the Sisters of the Order of St. Benedict of St. Benedict's Monastery in St. Cloud "to a woman who exemplifies Benedictine and Gospel values in her daily life."
- The Benedicta-Riepp-Weg in Waal, Bavaria is named for her.
- The Benedicta Riepp Inner-City Neighborhood Art House, a ministry of the Benedictine Sisters of Erie, is named for her. The Neighborhood Art House provides free education in arts, dance, music, and environmental science to low-income and at-risk children, at no cost.

St. Joseph Monastery is considered the foundation of the Congregation of St. Scholastica, a federation of the monasteries which trace their heritage from St. Joseph Monastery, which received the approval of the Holy See in 1922 (later renamed the Federation of St. Scholastica in 1974). Originally it consisted of ten houses in seven states; now, it encompasses 22 monasteries in 15 states, Mexico and Brazil.

== See also ==
- Benedictine Sisters of St. Walburg Monastery -Covington, Kentucky (1859)
- Benedictine Sisters of Chicago (1860)
- Sisters of St. Benedict of Ferdinand, Indiana (1867)
- Benedictine Sisters of Elizabeth, NJ (1868)
- Benedictine Sisters of Florida (1889)
