= Benedictine Sisters of St. Walburg Monastery =

The Benedictine Sisters of St. Walburg Monastery is a Catholic congregation of women. whose motherhouse, St. Walburg Monastery, is located at Villa Madonna, in Villa Hills, Kentucky. It was founded in 1859 by three sisters of the Benedictine congregation of Mount St. Benedict Monastery in Erie, Pennsylvania, who came to Covington to teach the German-speaking children of St. Joseph's parish. They became an independent congregation in 1867. Villa Madonna Academy, a private, Catholic K-12 school is part of the sisters' ministry in Kentucky. Besides operating the Academy, the sisters taught in parish schools and staffed St. John's Orphanage.

== Background ==
In 1852, Benedictine Mother Benedicta Riepp and two sisters left St. Walburga Abbey in Eichstätt, in the Kingdom of Bavaria to establish St. Joseph Monastery in Marienstadt in Elk County, Pennsylvania. As the Congregation of the Benedictine Sisters of Elk County grew, a daughter house was established in June 1856, when Mother Benedicta Rapp and five sisters arrived in Erie, Pennsylvania. This was the first foundation established from the original Motherhouse in America. The community increased such that it not only became an independent congregation, but in 1859 established its own first daughter house in Covington, Kentucky.

== St. Walburg Monastery ==
Benedictine Louis Mary Fink, a monk from the Monastery of Saint Vincent in Latrobe, and future bishop of Leavenworth, Kansas was pastor of St. Joseph's in Covington, Kentucky. He requested sisters from Mount St. Benedict Monastery in Erie, Pennsylvania to come to Covington to teach the German-speaking students of the parish school. Three sisters arrived in June 1859, led by Mother Alexia Lechner. Their first small monastery was built on Twelfth Street and dedicated to St. Walburg. In 1863, St. Walburg Academy for boarders and day students was established. The academy operated as an elementary school for young women. Later, a high school program was added. Income from the Academy helped support the sisters apostolate in the parish schools.

Villa Madonna Academy
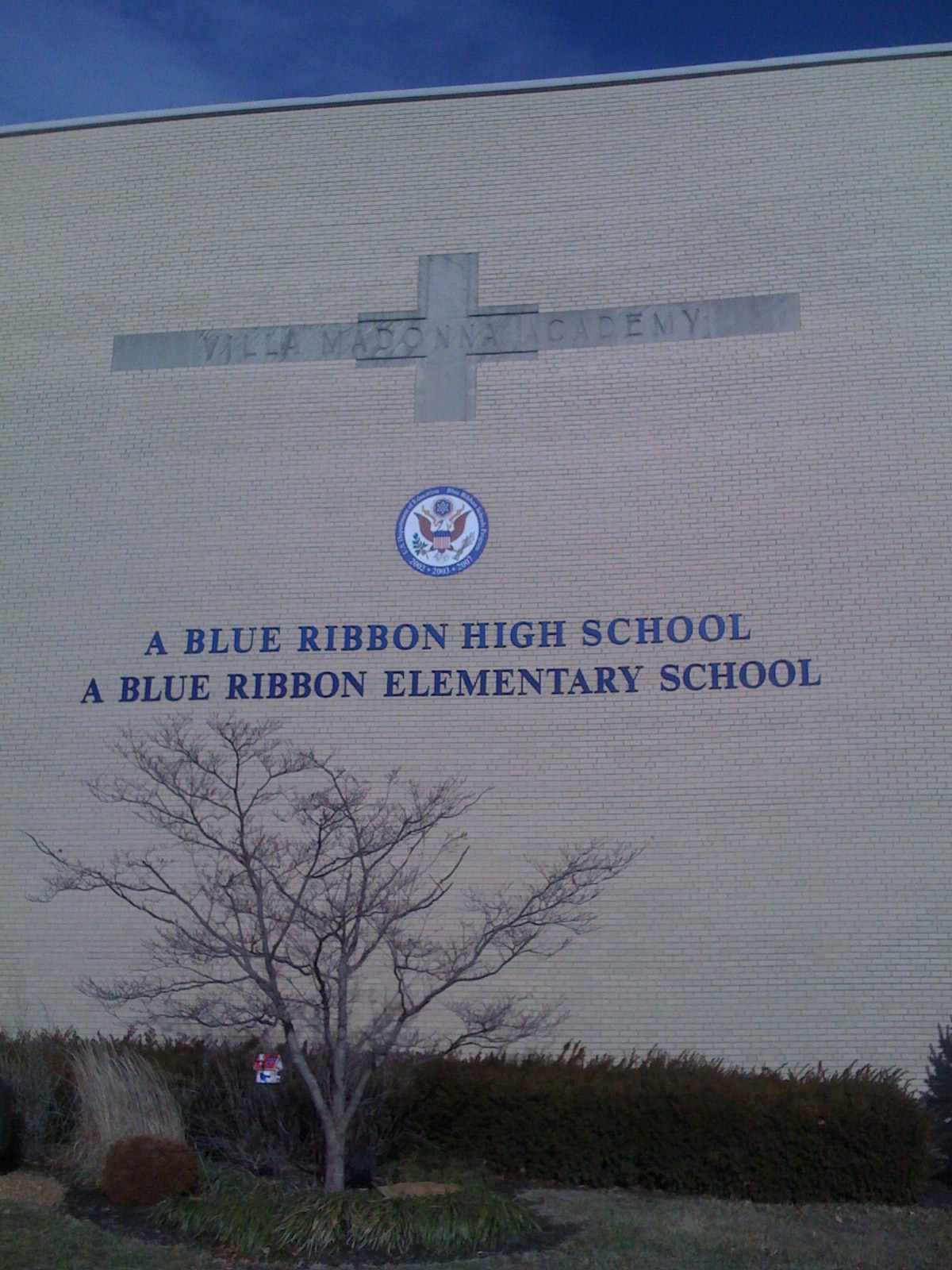

Location
- 2500 Amsterdam Road; Villa Hills, Kentucky 41017; United States
- Coordinates: 39°4′4″N 84°35′42″W

Information
- Type: Private, Day, College-prep
- Motto: Challenging Minds, Strengthening Spirits
- Religious affiliations: Catholic (Benedictines)
- Established: 1904
- Principal: Pamela McQueen (High School/Jr. High); Shoshana Bosley (Elementary)
- Grades: Kindergarten–12
- Gender: Coeducational
- Colors: Blue and White
- Nickname: Vikings
- Accreditation: Southern Association of Colleges and Schools
- Website: www.villamadonna.org

In 1867 that same year, a group of sisters was sent to establish a community in Ferdinand, Indiana. Three years later, nine Covington Benedictines established an independent community in New Orleans. In 1880, sisters were sent to take charge of schools in Alabama; this resulted in the founding of a separate congregation at the Convent of the Sacred Heart in Cullman, Alabama.

In 1871 the sisters began to staff St. John Orphanage in Fort Mitchell.

== Villa Madonna ==
In 1903, the Sisters of St. Benedict of St. Walburg's Monastery purchased the eighty-six acre W.C. Collins farm and residence about nine miles from Covington. The Property was named Villa Madonna and placed under the patronage of Our Lady of Good Counsel. In 1916, the novitiate moved from Covington to Villa Madonna, and the motherhouse in 1922. The sisters gather together at regular times to pray the Liturgy of the hours.

In 1918, they were dispatched to Covington and rural eastern Kentucky to tend to those suffering from influenza. The Sisters were also involved in nursing, and administering hospitals from 1946 to 1986. In 1947 the sisters took over operation of Mount Mary Hospital in Hazard, Kentucky. In 1977, Sr. Sylvester Shea taught ESL to Vietnamese refugees for Catholic Social Services. Sr. Andrea Collopy served for ten years as a volunteer EMT with the Crescent Springs Fire Department. At its height in the early sixties, the number of sisters was just over 270.

In 1921, the Sisters opened Villa Madonna College as a Normal school at Villa Madonna property; in 1929 it became a diocesan teachers college, sharing administration and instruction with the Sisters of Notre Dame, and the Congregation of Divine Providence, and moved to the St. Walburg Academy property in Covington as it was centrally located and on the streetcar line. St. Walburg Academy closed in 1931 to make room for the growing college program. The old St. Walburg Convent on East 12 Street in Covington was used as a convent for the sisters working at St. Joseph School and Villa Madonna College. Villa Madonna College was renamed Thomas More College in 1968 and relocated to its present site in Crestview Hills, Kentucky. That same year, St. Walburg convent and the college building on W 12th St. were demolished. In 2018, it became Thomas More University.

Villa Daycare and Villa Montessori School are also located on the 30-acre campus.

== Villa Madonna Academy ==
Villa Madonna Academy ("VMA") is a private, Catholic K-12 school in Villa Hills, Kentucky. It is located in the Diocese of Covington and founded by the Benedictine Sisters

Villa Madonna Academy opened in the Collins House, which housed both students and teachers. Ten boarders transferred from St. Walburg Academy in Covington. The cornerstone of the new Academy was laid by Bishop Camillus Paul Maes on March 24, 1906. The Villa Madonna Academy building was completed and the school opened in September 1907. By 1909, enrollment had reached 100 students. During the Ohio River flood of 1937, the school became a Red Cross station. During World War II, students served as members of the military, knitting clothing for the troops, and collecting milkweed pods used in making life jackets. A new building was dedicated in 1957. In 1969 a parking lot replaced the sheep pasture. The boarding school was discontinued in the 1970s. The high school became co-educational in the 1990s.

The school offers a K-12 curriculum. The elementary school consists of grades K–6, and the high school consists of a junior high (grades 7–8) and a high school (grades 9–12). The Academy is accredited by the Kentucky State Department of Education, and both the high school/junior high and elementary schools are accredited by Cognia and are Cognia Schools of Distinction. The high school/junior high and elementary school both have three National Blue Ribbon School awards, and the high school/junior high is also a Blue Ribbon Schools of Excellence Lighthouse School – the highest possible designation.
