= Hill-Murray School =

Location
- 2625 East Larpenteur Avenue; Maplewood, (Ramsey County), Minnesota 55109-5098; United States; 44°59′36″N 92°59′25″W

Information
- Type: Private, Coeducational
- Motto: Hill-Murray empowers students to reach their fullest potential by inspiring them to utilize their God-given strengths to become leaders who will make a positive difference in the world.
- Religious affiliation: Roman Catholic
- Established: Archbishop Murray (1958); Hill High (1959) consolidated (1971); Middle School (1989)
- President: Melissa Dan
- Principal: Elizabeth Marin
- Grades: 6–12
- Campus: Suburban
- Colors: Green, white and black
- Sports: Hockey, basketball, football, lacrosse, soccer, tennis, baseball, softball, swimming, golf
- Nickname: Pios
- Team name: Pioneers
- Rival: White Bear Lake Area High School
- Accreditation: Lumen Accreditation, Cognia Accreditation, National Association of Independent Schools
- www.hill-murray.org

Hill-Murray School is a coeducational private Catholic school serving grades 6–12. It is on a 40-acre (16 ha) site in Maplewood, Minnesota, United States, a suburb of Saint Paul. Located in the Archdiocese of Saint Paul and Minneapolis, it was established in 1971 as a result of the consolidation of Archbishop Murray Memorial High School and Hill High School. The student population is drawn from the Twin Cities, surrounding suburban areas, and nearby Wisconsin communities. Hill-Murray is one of 21 Minnesota high schools accredited by the North Central Association of Colleges and Schools.

== History ==
The Benedictine Sisters of St. Paul's Monastery founded Archbishop Murray in 1958 as a school for young women. It was named after Archbisop John Murray. The Christian Brothers established Hill High in 1959 as a school for young men. The school was named after James J. Hill, whose will left $400,000 "for a high school to be conducted by the Christian Brothers under the supervision of the Archdiocese of St. Paul." The two schools, merged in 1971. The Hill High school location is now the Mounds Park academy. The middle school was added in 1989.

== Athletics ==
Hill-Murray is a member of the Metro East Conference in the Minnesota State High School League. There are 24 varsity sports teams for men and women. The athletic department is known for its boys' hockey team, led by head coach Bill Lechner. The Pioneers have won four MSHSL state championships and have a record of 277–90–15. The school's hockey rivalry with White Bear Lake has deep roots and is considered the most intense and most watched rivalry in the state, routinely drawing sold-out crowds in the thousands to Aldrich Arena.

State Championships
Season	Sport	Number of Championships	Year
Fall	Soccer, Boys	1	2023
Winter	Hockey, Boys	6	1970, 1972, 1983, 1991, 2008, 2020
Winter	Hockey, Girls	3	2014, 2015, 2025, 2026
Winter	Alpine Skiing, Girls	3	2023, 2025, 2026
Spring	Baseball, Boys	2	1972, 1976
Spring	Softball, Girls	1	1983
Total		10	

- Hill (1970) and Hill-Murray (1972) won Independent (non-MSHSL) State Hockey Titles
- Hill-Murray (1972) won Independent (non-MSHSL) State Baseball Title
- The Pioneers won state titles in several sports prior to joining the MSHSL in 1974/75

== Performing arts ==
Hill-Murray is well known for its various performing arts programs. It has eight different bands, five choirs, and the theatre department produces six shows each year.

Performing Arts Awards and Accomplishments
Department	Production/Student	Title
Theatre	The Great Gatsby (One Act, 2015)	Section 4AA Conference Champions; State One Act Festival Starred Performance

== Academics ==
Hill-Murray High School Courses
Category	Number of Courses
Business	7
English	12
Family and Consumer Science	4
Fine Arts	20
Learning Resources	2
Math	15
Physical Education and Health	7
Religious Studies	9
Science	11
Levels of French and Spanish	5
Social Studies	13
Technology Education	2

On Niche, the school has a grade of A.

For dual credit, the school offers College in the Schools (CIS) and six Advanced Placement (AP) courses.

== Demographics ==
Hill-Murray has a diverse student background, including different cultures, faiths, and economic backgrounds,. The school draws students from 110 different middle and elementary schools. 10% of students are students of color, 80% are Catholic, and 96% participate in at least one co-curricular activity. The student body comes from all over the metro area, including parts of Wisconsin.

The school served grades 7-12 until the 2015–16 school year, when a 6th grade was added.

As of the 2024–2025 school year, the school has a yearly tuition of $16,151, with 30% of students on financial aid.

== Notable alumni ==
- Joey Anderson, professional hockey player for the New Jersey Devils.
- Mikey Anderson, professional hockey player for the Los Angeles Kings.
- Hannah Brandt, olympic hockey player Team USA, 2018 Pyeongchang Winter Olympics, US National Team member
- Marissa Brandt, olympic hockey player Team Korea, 2018 Pyeongchang Winter Olympics
- Jack Cichy, professional football player for the Tampa Bay Buccaneers, Super Bowl LV winner
- Mike Gibbons, professional hockey player and coach.
- Jake Guentzel, professional ice hockey player for the Carolina Hurricanes.
- Mike Hoeffel, professional ice hockey player
- Steve Janaszak, professional ice hockey player, 1980 Olympic "Miracle On Ice" Team
- Craig Johnson, professional ice hockey player
- Reed Kelly, Survivor: San Juan del Sur cast member and Broadway performer.
- Dave Langevin, professional ice hockey player, member of 4 New York Islanders Stanley Cup Championship teams
- Devoney Looser, literary critic and Jane Austen scholar.
- Frannie Marin, Survivor 44 cast member.
- Robb Quinlan, professional baseball player for the Anaheim Angels from 2003 to 2010. Current Minnesota Golden Gophers 1st base coach.
- Tom Quinlan, baseball player for the Minnesota Twins & Toronto Blue Jays
- Lino Rulli, Emmy Award-winning producer and radio host (The Catholic Guy)
- Joe Soucheray, syndicated talk show host
- David Tanabe, professional ice hockey player
