= Mary Louise St. John =

Benedictine nun

Sister Mary Louise St. John, O.S.B. (March 13, 1943 – September 14, 2003), was a Benedictine nun and a member of the Benedictine Sisters of Erie, Pennsylvania. She was an advocate for the rights of people with physical disabilities, as well as for the gay community.

== Life ==
Born on March 13, 1943, in Glens Falls, New York, Mary Louise St. John was a daughter of Joseph St. John and Alvarez DeMarsh. She had two sisters, Maria and Murial. As a child she developed muscular dystrophy, a lifelong condition. Her mother had to fight to provide her with a decent education due to the discrimination children with disabilities faced.

In 1970, Mary Louise St. John entered the Benedictine Sisters of Jesus Crucified at their now-defunct Regina Mundi Priory in Devon, Pennsylvania. It was an enclosed religious order dedicated to making the contemplative life possible for women with physical disabilities. In 1978, she transferred to the Erie Benedictine congregation and professed her perpetual monastic vows at their motherhouse, Mount St. Benedict, in 1982.

St. John worked as a cytotechnologist at Regina Mundi in Devon from 1974 to 1976 and as a tutor there from 1976 to 1978. She also tutored students at Mount St. Benedict from 1979 to 1983, served as the business manager of the monastery's Benet Press from 1980 to 1985 and had ministered as a retreat guide and spiritual companion to gays and lesbians since 1985.

St. John was an advocate for the rights of people with physical disabilities, as well as the gay community while serving on the board of directors of Community Resources for Independence in Erie. She helped create the Womynspace Coffeehouse in 1989, and she spoke at the 1998 Erie Gay Pride Rally.

In 1989, St. John attended a conference in Garrison, New York on "homosexuality among priests, nuns and religious brothers". While at the conference, she spoke on a panel, during which she said "to alienate my lesbian identity from the identity of the Godness within me would be to dismember myself". However, St. John clarified she did keep her vow of celibacy.

== Death ==
Sister Mary Louise died on September 14, 2003, at the age of 60, from complications of muscular dystrophy.
