= St. Paul's Monastery =

Benedictine monastery in Minnesota

- Interactive map of St. Paul's Monastery

Monastery information
- Denomination: Benedictine (Catholic)
- Established: 1948

Site
- Location: Maplewood, Minnesota
- Country: United States
- Coordinates: 44.9953°N 92.9872°W

St. Paul’s Monastery is a Benedictine women’s monastic community located in Maplewood, Minnesota. Founded in 1948 as St. Paul’s Priory in St. Paul, Minnesota, the community was established by sisters from Saint Benedict’s Monastery in St. Joseph, Minnesota, and was renamed St. Paul’s Monastery in 1997.

The community is part of the Monastic Congregation of St. Benedict, also known as the Federation of St. Benedict.

== Background and founding ==
The congregation’s American roots trace to mid-19th-century Benedictine activity in the United States. Abbot Boniface Wimmer's’s 1846 mission and subsequent recruitment of sisters from Bavaria contributed to the establishment of Benedictine women’s houses in the United States.

Mother Benedicta Riepp and companions from Eichstätt were central to founding the first Benedictine women’s communities in North America, including those later established in Minnesota.

The women of St. Benedict’s Monastery in St. Joseph initially focused on elementary education and domestic training during the 19th century and expanded into secondary and collegiate education in the 20th century.

In 1948, 178 sisters from St. Benedict’s Monastery founded St. Paul’s Priory at 301 Summit Avenue in St. Paul, at the invitation of Archbishop John Gregory Murray. Mother Loraine Tracy served as the community’s first prioress and was succeeded by Mother Marcelline Jung in 1954.

== Mid-20th-century growth and relocation ==
Following postwar growth, the sisters purchased approximately 80 acres in Maplewood in 1965 and constructed a modernist priory building designed by Minnesota architect Val Michelson. The relocation and construction were reported in regional press coverage at the time.

The Summit Avenue building was subsequently sold to the Germanic-American Institute in 1965.

The Maplewood complex later housed Archbishop Murray Memorial High School, a girls’ school founded by the Benedictine community in 1958. The school merged in 1971 with Hill High School (founded 1959) to form the coeducational Hill-Murray School. The priory building has been recognized by the City of Maplewood for its architectural significance and is considered eligible for listing on the National Register of Historic Places.

== Ministries, outreach, and later developments ==
St. Paul’s Monastery expanded its ministries in the late 20th and early 21st centuries. The Benedictine Center, founded in 1983, is closely associated with St. Paul’s Monastery and serves as a retreat center offering spiritual direction, retreats, workshops, and programs rooted in Benedictine spirituality.

From 1993 to 2003, the sisters operated a downtown Benedictine Meditation Center; this program was later continued by Minnesota Contemplative Outreach. In 1996, the community initiated an interfaith residential experiment known as Peace Dwelling, and in the late 1990s formally adopted the name St. Paul’s Monastery.

The Maplewood campus includes a Chartres-style outdoor walking labyrinth and the Maple Tree Childcare Center, which opened in 1991 and continues to serve local families.

== Property transitions and partnerships ==
In 2006, the sisters sold the Michelson building in Maplewood to Tubman (formerly Tubman Family Alliance) for use as services supporting survivors of domestic violence.

That same year, additional land was sold to CommonBond Communities for affordable and senior housing development. In 2009, a new monastery building was constructed on the Maplewood site.
