= Villa Hills, Kentucky =

- City
- Location of Villa Hills in Kenton County, Kentucky.
- Coordinates: 39°03′56″N 84°35′42″W
- Country: United States
- State: Kentucky
- County: Kenton
- Established: June 7, 1962

Government
  - Type: Mayor-Council
  - Mayor: Heather Jansen

Area
  - Total: 4.36 sq mi (11.29 km^{2})
  - Land: 3.60 sq mi (9.33 km^{2})
  - Water: 0.76 sq mi (1.96 km^{2})
- Elevation: 886 ft (270 m)

Population (2020)
  - Total: 7,310
  - Estimate (2025): 7,797
  - Density: 2,030/sq mi (783.7/km^{2})
- Time zone: UTC-5 (Eastern (EST))
  - Summer (DST): UTC-4 (EDT)
- ZIP code: 41017
- Area code: 859
- FIPS code: 21-79698
- GNIS feature ID: 2405652
- Website: villahillsky.org

Villa Hills is a home rule-class city in Kenton County, Kentucky along the Ohio River. The population was 7,310 at the 2020 census.

== Geography ==
According to the United States Census Bureau, the city has a total area of 4.4 square miles (11 km^{2}), of which 3.7 square miles (9.6 km^{2}) is land and 0.8 square miles (2.1 km^{2}) (16.85%) is water.

== Demographics ==
=== 2020 census ===
As of the 2020 census, Villa Hills had a population of 7,310. The median age was 47.6 years. 20.5% of residents were under the age of 18 and 25.2% of residents were 65 years of age or older. For every 100 females there were 92.6 males, and for every 100 females age 18 and over there were 90.4 males age 18 and over.

100.0% of residents lived in urban areas, while 0.0% lived in rural areas.

There were 2,888 households in Villa Hills, of which 27.7% had children under the age of 18 living in them. Of all households, 61.7% were married-couple households, 12.2% were households with a male householder and no spouse or partner present, and 21.2% were households with a female householder and no spouse or partner present. About 23.3% of all households were made up of individuals and 11.8% had someone living alone who was 65 years of age or older.

There were 2,967 housing units, of which 2.7% were vacant. The homeowner vacancy rate was 0.5% and the rental vacancy rate was 2.2%.

Racial composition as of the 2020 census
Race	Number	Percent
White	6,579	90.0%
Black or African American	48	0.7%
American Indian and Alaska Native	11	0.2%
Asian	318	4.4%
Native Hawaiian and Other Pacific Islander	1	0.0%
Some other race	44	0.6%
Two or more races	309	4.2%
Hispanic or Latino (of any race)	136	1.9%

=== 2000 census ===
As of the census of 2000, there were 7,948 people, 2,808 households, and 2,209 families residing in the city. The population density was 2,144.3 inhabitants per square mile (827.9/km^{2}). There were 2,855 housing units at an average density of 770.2 per square mile (297.4/km^{2}). The racial makeup of the city was 97.52% White, 0.45% African American, 0.16% Native American, 0.94% Asian, 0.16% from other races, and 0.75% from two or more races. Hispanic or Latino of any race were 0.84% of the population.

There were 2,808 households, out of which 38.9% had children under the age of 18 living with them, 69.6% were married couples living together, 7.1% had a female householder with no husband present, and 21.3% were non-families. 18.4% of all households were made up of individuals, and 5.8% had someone living alone who was 65 years of age or older. The average household size was 2.78 and the average family size was 3.20.

In the city, the population was spread out, with 26.7% under the age of 18, 7.9% from 18 to 24, 26.3% from 25 to 44, 29.1% from 45 to 64, and 10.0% who were 65 years of age or older. The median age was 39 years. For every 100 females, there were 96.2 males. For every 100 females age 18 and over, there were 89.8 males.

Historical population
Census	Pop.	Note	%±
1970	1,647		—
1980	4,384		166.2%
1990	7,739		76.5%
2000	7,948		2.7%
2010	7,489		−5.8%
2020	7,310		−2.4%
2025 (est.)	7,797		6.7%
U.S. Decennial Census

=== Income and poverty ===
The median income for a household in the city was $73,523, and the median income for a family was $79,810. Males had a median income of $60,792 versus $34,949 for females. The per capita income for the city was $34,373. About 1.5% of families and 2.5% of the population were below the poverty line, including 2.1% of those under age 18 and 9.3% of those age 65 or over.

== Education ==
There are two schools in Villa Hills currently. River Ridge Elementary is the local public elementary school, and Villa Madonna Academy, for which the town was named, is the local K-12 Roman Catholic school.

== See also ==
- List of cities and towns along the Ohio River
