= St. Croix River Hounds =

Collegiate summer baseball team in the Northwoods League

Coordinates: 44°56′48″N 92°43′32″W

- Logo

Information
- League: Northwoods League
- Location: 2200 Carmichael Rd. Hudson, WI 54016
- Ballpark: New Hudson Ballpark
- Founded: 2017
- Mascot: Hudson, a retired racing greyhound
- Ownership: Klint Klaas, CEO/Owner; Tom Quinlan, Robb Quinlan, Andy Persby, Steve Fleischhacker, Kevin McMann, Owners
- Management: President/General Manager

The St. Croix River Hounds was a planned collegiate summer baseball team intended to play in the Northwoods League. The team ownership group included former Major League Baseball players Tom Quinlan and Robb Quinlan.

It was first reported in July 2017 that the team could begin play in the 2018 season. In October 2017, that slipped to 2019; in October 2018, to 2020; and in October 2019, to 2021. As of April 29, 2021, ballpark construction had not begun, but the team still expressed "the intention to begin the build this year." In July 2022, a revised development plan was presented that would call for a 1,400 seat facility that could open as soon as June 2023. The River Hounds were still not listed in the Northwoods League schedule for 2023.

In October 2023, the team was removed from the Northwoods League website as a future club, with the team's website linking back to the Northwoods League homepage. In February 2025, a league spokesman said that was due to "a redesign of the site. I think that was more of taking the logo down without knowing exactly when they were hoping to break ground and have a facility. That was the only reason that was taken down." He added that "the intention is for the River Hounds to play in 2026." The team was not included in the 2026 league schedule, with the travel-only Minnesota Mud Puppies returning to balance the Great Plains Division schedule.
