= Robb Quinlan =

American baseball player (born 1977)

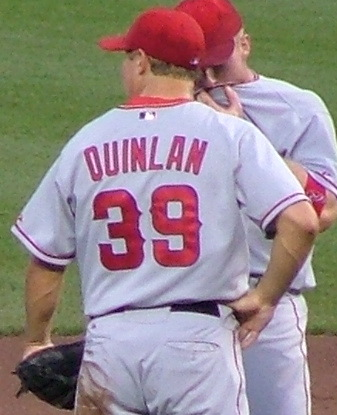
- Quinlan with the Los Angeles Angels in 2004
- First baseman / Third baseman
- Born: March 17, 1977 (age 48); St. Paul, Minnesota, U.S.
- Batted: Right Threw: Right

MLB debut
- July 28, 2003, for the Anaheim Angels

Last MLB appearance
- June 25, 2010, for the Los Angeles Angels of Anaheim

MLB statistics
- Batting average: .276
- Home runs: 25
- Runs batted in: 121
- Stats at Baseball Reference

Teams
- Anaheim Angels / Los Angeles Angels of Anaheim (2003–2010)

Robb William Quinlan (born March 17, 1977) is an American former Major League Baseball utility player who played first base, third base, corner outfield, catcher and designated hitter for the Anaheim Angels / Los Angeles Angels of Anaheim between 2003 and 2010.

== Amateur career ==
A native of St. Paul, Minnesota, Quinlan attended Hill-Murray School in Maplewood, Minnesota. At Hill-Murray School he set the state and school record for consecutive time reaching base. In his junior year in 1994, Quinlan reached base 86 consecutive times, garnering praise from newspapers around the country. He was drafted by the California Angels in the 33rd round (900th overall) of the 1995 Major League Baseball draft out of high school and was offered $50, but did not sign with them. Instead, Quinlan decided to attend the University of Minnesota and graduated from there in 1999, obtaining a degree in marketing and communications.

While at Minnesota, he was selected to the Big Ten Conference All-Star team three times, in 1997, 1998, and 1999. In 1997, he played collegiate summer baseball with the Cotuit Kettleers of the Cape Cod Baseball League where he was named a league all-star. In 1999, he was Big Ten Conference Player of the Year after leading the conference in batting average at .416 and hits (92). Quinlan left as the Big Ten Conference's career leader in hits and Minnesota's career leader in hits, home runs, doubles, runs scored, RBI, total bases, and at-bats.

He was drafted again by the Anaheim Angels in the 10th round of the 1999 Major League Baseball draft and signed on June 10.

== Professional career ==
=== Minor leagues ===
In 1999, Quinlan played third base for the Low-A Boise Hawks making the Short-Season All-Star team and being named the Northwest League's MVP. He batted .322 with 9 home runs and 77 RBI. In 2000, he was promoted to High-A Lake Elsinore and moved to first base; he hit .317 with 85 RBI. Quinlan was promoted to Double-A Arkansas for 2001 and after a solid year, began 2002 with Triple-A Salt Lake as an outfielder.

2002 was a career year for Quinlan. He spent the entire year with Triple-A Salt Lake and hit .333, posting career-highs in home runs (20), RBI (112), hits (176), and triples (13). He was named Pacific Coast League Rookie of the Year, PCL MVP, and Anaheim Angels Minor League Player of the Year. He was also named a Triple-A All-Star, PCL All-Star, and one of Baseball America's 1st team minor league All-Stars.

Quinlan started 2003 in the minors with Triple-A Salt Lake, but after batting .310, he was called up to the majors where he spent the rest of the year. He began 2004 with Triple-A again, but was called up to the majors after 27 games.

=== Major leagues ===
Quinlan made his major league debut on July 28, 2003, and hit .287 for the rest of the year. After starting 2004 in Triple-A, he was called up the first week in May. He had a 21-game hit streak in 2004 from July 7 to August 10 which is the longest by an Angels rookie in club history, and was the longest by any rookie in the majors since Ichiro Suzuki (23) in 2001. On August 17, he was placed on the 15-day disabled list with a torn oblique muscle, causing him to miss the rest of the year. For the season, Quinlan batted .344, including .407 in July, with 5 home runs and 23 RBI.

In 2005, Quinlan, playing part-time, saw his batting average drop over 100 points to .231 and missed time with a bulging disk and inflamed shoulder. He rebounded in 2006 with a .321 average and saw a career-high in playing time with 234 at-bats in 86 games. Quinlan signed a two-year, $1.8 million contract before the 2007 season avoiding arbitration, but his batting average slumped again to .247. In 2008, he played in 68 games mostly at third base and slightly improved his average to .262.

After the 2009 baseball season Quinlan filed for free agency for the first time in his career. On February 11, 2010, Quinlan agreed to a minor league contract to return to the Angels. He was added to the Major League roster at the end of spring training. On September 7, 2010, Quinlan was released by the Angels.

Quinlan signed a minor league contract with the Philadelphia Phillies with an invitation to spring training for the 2011 season. On March 11, 2011, the Phillies reassigned Quinlan and his agent asked for his release, which the Phillies granted.

== Personal ==
In May 2011, Quinlan became a volunteer coach and hitting instructor for the University of Minnesota, his alma mater, through at least the 2011-12 season.

Since 2013, Quinlan has been the owner of multiple chiropractic franchises.

Quinlan's older brother, Tom Quinlan, spent parts of four seasons in the major leagues with the Blue Jays, Phillies, and Twins. Tom and Robb Quinlan were part of the ownership group for the St. Croix River Hounds, a collegiate summer baseball team intended to play at Hudson, Wisconsin in the Northwoods League. First reported on in July 2017, the team was removed from the Northwoods League website in 2023.

Preceded by Bobby Crosby	AL Rookie of the Month; July 2004	Succeeded by Frank Francisco
