= Benedictine Sisters of Chicago =

Catholic Benedictine congregation of women

Benedictine Sisters of Chicago is a Catholic Benedictine congregation of women. It was founded in 1861 by three sisters of the Benedictine congregation of Mount St. Benedict Monastery in Erie, Pennsylvania, who came to Chicago to teach the German-speaking children of St. Joseph's parish. They became an independent congregation in 1872. St. Scholastica's Monastery in Rogers Park, Chicago is the Motherhouse. St. Scholastica Academy was an integral part of the sisters' ministry in Chicago.

== Background ==
In 1852, Benedictine Mother Benedicta Riepp and two sisters left St. Walburga Abbey in Eichstätt, in the Kingdom of Bavaria to establish St. Joseph Monastery in Marienstadt in Elk County, Pennsylvania. As the Congregation of the Benedictine Sisters of Elk County grew, a daughter house was established in June 1856, when Mother Benedicta Rapp and five sisters arrived in Erie, Pennsylvania. It was the first foundation established from the original Motherhouse in America. The community increased such that it not only became an independent congregation, but in 1860 established its own daughter house in Chicago.

== St. Scholastica Monastery ==
Sisters from Mount St. Benedict Monastery in Erie, Pennsylvania came to Chicago at the request of fellow Benedictine Louis Mary Fink, future bishop of Leavenworth, Kansas. A monk from the Monastery of Saint Vincent in Latrobe, Pennsylvania, Father Fink had previously served as pastor in Covington, Kentucky where two years before he had obtained sisters from Erie to staff St. Joseph's parochial school. Assigned as a pastor in Chicago, he again had recourse to the Benedictine Sisters of Erie to teach the German-speaking children in his new parish of St. Joseph. Three sisters arrived in August 1861 and immediately took charge of the parochial school. They were subsequently joined by sisters from St. Joseph Monastery in St Marys, Pennsylvania.

St. Scholastica Academy

Location
- 7416 North Ridge Boulevard; Chicago, Illinois 60645; United States
- 42°1′0″N 87°41′6″W

Information
- Type: private
- Denomination: Catholic
- Established: 1865
- Closed: 2012
- Oversight: Archdiocese of Chicago
- President: Loretta Namovic
- Principal: Colleen Brewer
- Grades: 9-12
- Gender: all-female
- Enrollment: 200 (2008)
- Campus type: urban
- Colors: navy blue and white
- Athletics conference: Girls Catholic Athletic Conference
- Mascot: Stinger Bee
- Team name: Stingers
- Accreditation: North Central Association of Colleges and Schools
- Newspaper: The Raven
- Tuition: $9,600 (2009–2010)
- Affiliation: Benedictine
- Website: www.scholastica.us

In 1865, they opened St. Joseph Academy. The school building at Cass St. and Chicago Avenue served as the convent and also accommodated boarding students. The Great Chicago Fire of 1871 destroyed the school, and in 1872, they re-established the academy at Hill and Orleans Streets under the name "Saints Benedict and Scholastica Academy". That same year, the sisters incorporated as the "Benedictine Sisters of Chicago". In 1874, they established St. Mary's Convent in Nauvoo, Illinois, which became a separate congregation.

Needing more room, land was purchased in Rogers Park, Chicago. The Convent and Academy of St. Scholastica relocated there in 1906. This became the Motherhouse of the congregation. In 1924, a new section was added that includes St. Scholastica Chapel. Its stained glass windows depict the hours of the Divine Office. St. Joseph Court, an infirmary for the care of elderly sisters, was built in 1980.

The monastery grounds, totaling more than 14 acres, contain a grape arbor, gardens and a labyrinth. The Academy was an integral part of the sisters' ministry in Chicago. The sisters publish a biannual newsletter, Sacro Speco.

The Benedictine Sisters of Chicago taught at the parochial schools in Chicago, Skokie Waukegan, Illinois. They also established mission schools in Colorado in Breckenridge, Delta, Pueblo, and Salida. St. Scholastica Academy in Canon City served as a day and boarding school for young women from 1890 until it closed in 2001.

In 1977, the sisters initiated an Oblates program for lay people who wish to live out the Rule of Benedict in their day-to-day life as single or married people.

== St. Scholastica's, Ridge Boulevard ==
The Academy, originally called St. Joseph's, opened in 1865 in the convent of the sisters, who also taught at the parish school. It was one of the oldest Catholic academies for young women in Chicago.

St. Scholastica Academy opened on Ridge Boulevard in Chicago in 1907. The Sisters taught girls from grades one through twelve until the 1940s, when it became a high school. The academy enrolled young women from diverse economic, religious, racial and ethnic backgrounds throughout the Chicago metropolitan area. In addition to college prep programs, the school offered the International Baccalaureate Diploma Program for selected students in 11th and 12th grade. Students scored above the State of Illinois average on International Baccalaureate assessments. The average class size was 15 students. St. Scholastica Academy was the sponsored ministry of the Benedictine sisters of Chicago.

The school had a very competitive sports program, winning seven Regional titles and a District Championship. The team name "Stingers" derived from the sisters' hobby of keeping bees on the large campus behind the school.

It was announced on March 14, 2012, that due to declining enrollment, SSA would close its doors at the end of the 2012–2013 school year. The building is now occupied by an elementary school run by the UNO Network of Charter Schools.
