= Saint Benedict's Monastery (St. Joseph, Minnesota) =

Benedectine monastery in St. Joseph, Minnesota

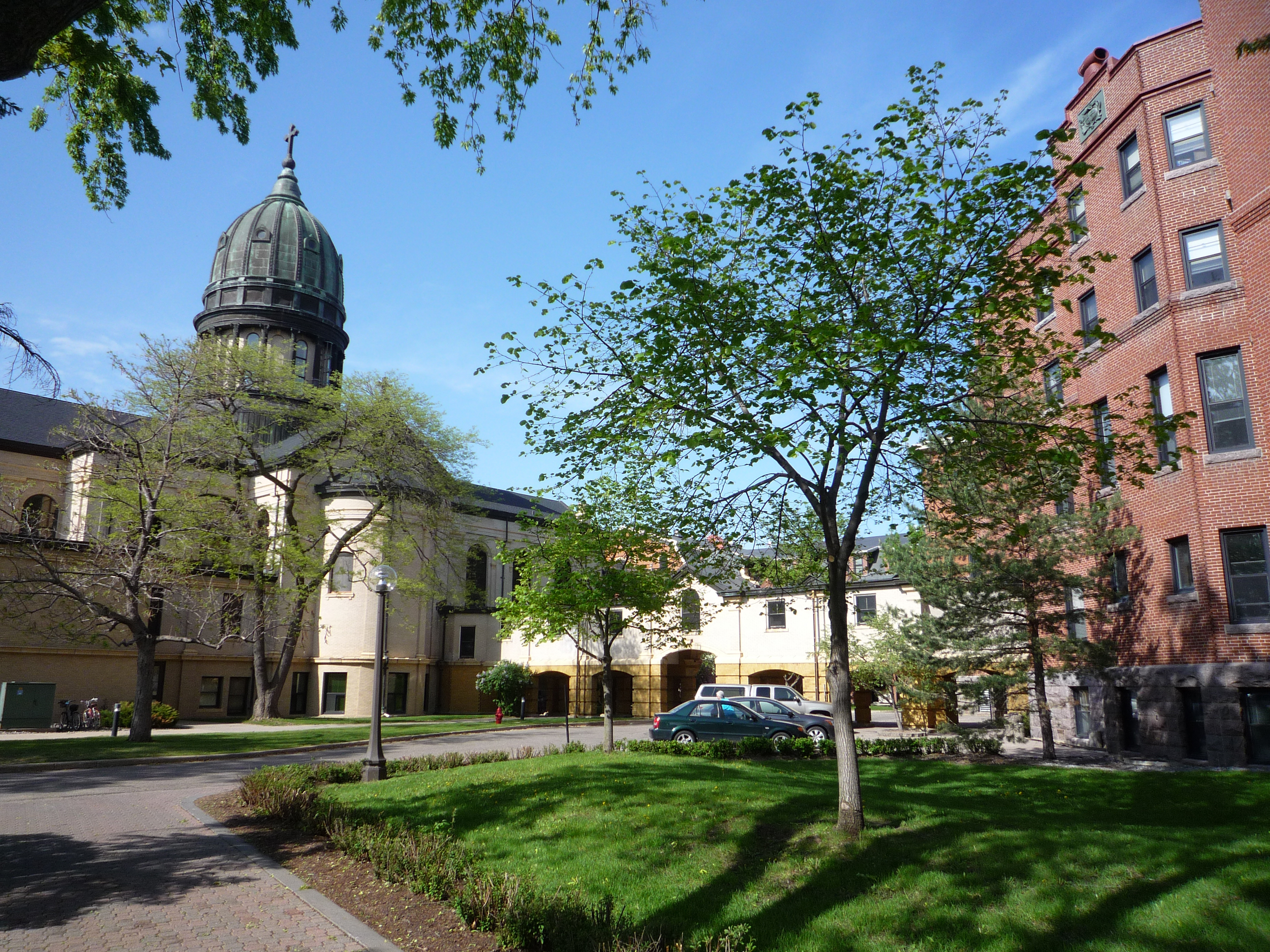
- The Sacred Heart Chapel, Main Building, and Main Convent at Saint Benedict's Monastery

- Location within Minnesota Location within the United States

Monastery information
- Order: Order of Saint Benedict
- Established: 1863
- Mother house: St. Joseph Monastery, St. Marys, Pennsylvania
- Archdiocese: Archdiocese of Saint Paul and Minneapolis
- Diocese: Roman Catholic Diocese of Saint Cloud

People
- Founder: Benedicta Riepp
- Prior: Sister Susan Rudolph

Site
- Location: 104 Chapel Lane, St. Joseph, Minnesota, United States
- Coordinates: 45°33′47″N 94°19′7″W
- Public access: Yes
- Website: sbm.osb.org
- St. Benedict's Convent and College Historic District
- U.S. National Register of Historic Places
- U.S. Historic district
- Area: 6 acres (2.4 ha)
- Built: 1882–1920s
- Architect: George Bergmann, George Stauduhar, Buechner & Orth, et al.
- Architectural style: Beaux-Arts, Renaissance Revival, Romanesque Revival
- NRHP reference No.: 89000160
- Added to NRHP: March 20, 1989

Saint Benedict's Monastery is a monastery (or convent) of the Sisters of the Order of Saint Benedict, in St. Joseph, Minnesota, United States. The 18th and current prioress of Saint Benedict's Monastery is Sister Karen Rose, OSB who was installed on June 4, 2023.

== History ==
The Sisters trace their roots to Saint Walburg Abbey in Eichstätt, in the Kingdom of Bavaria. Six of them emigrated to St. Cloud, Minnesota, in 1857, moving to St. Joseph in 1863. Mother Benedicta Riepp, considered the founder of Benedictine women's communities in the United States, is buried in the monastery cemetery. Seven sisters from the convent moved to Atchison, Kansas, where they founded the Sisters of Mount St. Scholastica.

Recognizing the need for higher education, they founded Saint Benedict's Academy in 1878, which developed into the College of Saint Benedict in 1913. In 1961, the Sisters transferred ownership of the college, constituting it as a separately incorporated institution. As two fiscally independent corporations, the college and the Monastery share adjacent campuses but are governed by two separate Boards (the Monastic Council governs the Sisters).

Saint Benedict's Monastery has been the largest Benedictine community of women in the world, with a peak membership of 1,278 in 1946. In 2010, it was the largest Benedictine community of women in the United States with nearly 300 members.

On August 15, 2012, the 27 Sisters living at Saint Bede Monastery became members of Saint Benedict's Monastery. On March 27, 2012, the Sisters of Saint Benedict's had voted to receive the Benedictine Sisters of Saint Bede's Monastery in Eau Claire, Wisconsin. Their Monastery's land was purchased by the University of Wisconsin for use in a children's education program.

=== Current and former Prioresses of Saint Benedict's Monastery ===
1. Mother Willibalda Sherbauer, OSB, 1857–1868
2. Mother Antonia Herman, OSB, 1868–1877
3. Mother Aloysia Bath, OSB, 1877–1880
4. Mother Scholastica Kerst, OSB, 1880–1889
5. Mother Aloysia Bath, OSB, 1889–1901
6. Mother Cecelia Kapsner, OSB, 1901–1919
7. Mother Louise Walz, OSB, 1919–1937
8. Mother Rosamond Pratschner, OSB 1937–1949
9. Mother Richarda Peters, OSB, 1949–1961
10. Mother Henrita Osendorf, OSB, 1961–1973
11. Sister Evin Rademacher, OSB, 1973–1981
12. Sister Katherine Howard, OSB, 1981–1989
13. Sister Mary Reuter, OSB, 1989–1995
14. Sister Ephrem Hollermann, OSB, 1995–2005
15. Sister Nancy Bauer, OSB, 2005–2011
16. Sister Michaela Hedican, OSB, 2011–2017
17. Sister Susan Rudolph, OSB, 2017–2023
18. Sister Karen Rose, OSB, 2023–Present

== Buildings ==
The central core of the convent and college was listed as a historic district on the National Register of Historic Places in 1989 for having local significance in the themes of architecture, education, and religion. The St. Benedict's Convent and College Historic District consists of 14 buildings, two other structures, and five objects built between 1882 and the late 1920s. The district was nominated for representing the impact and growth of the world's largest Sisters of the Order of Saint Benedict community.

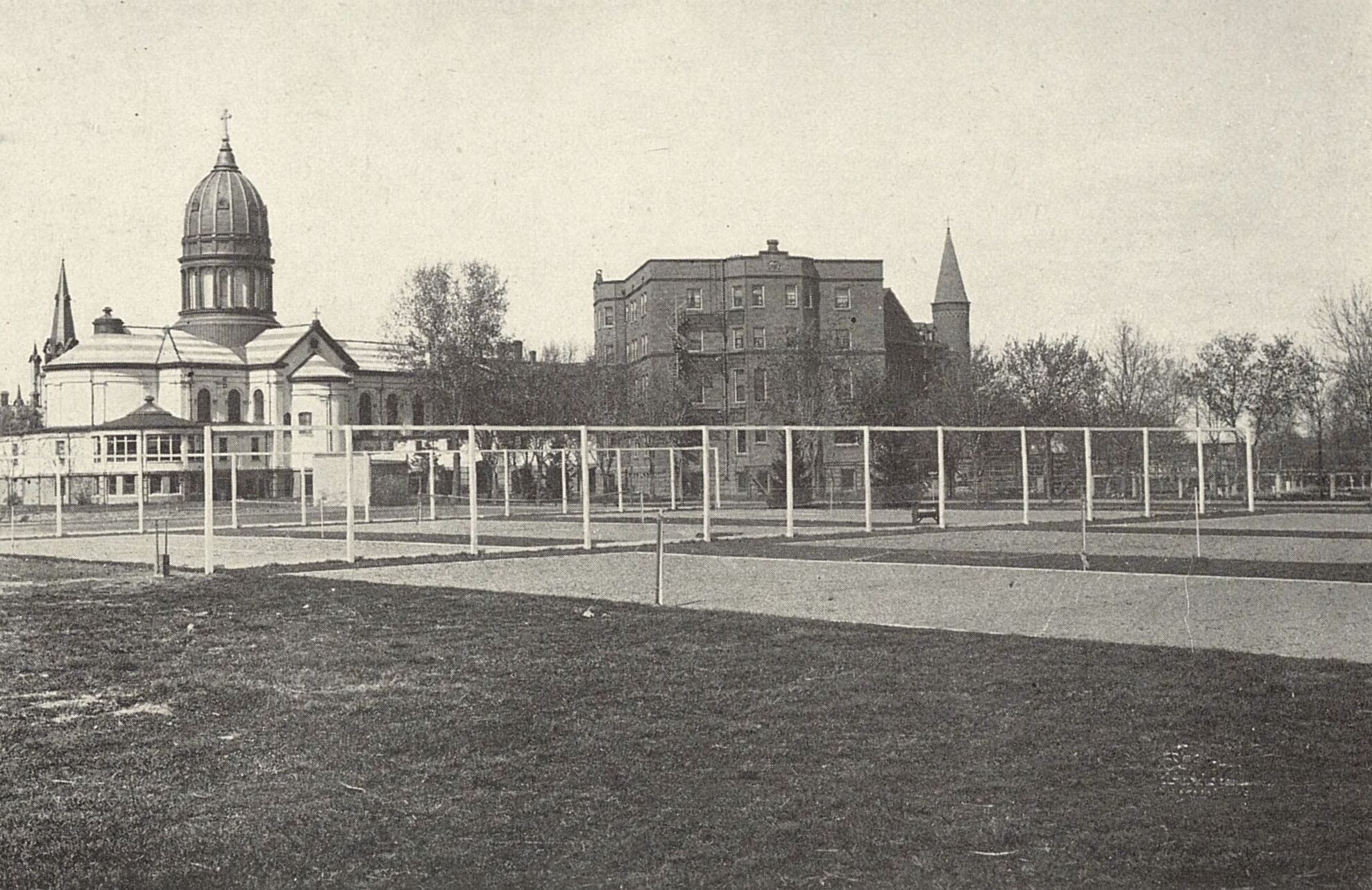
St. Benedict's Monastery, St. Joseph, Minnesota, circa 1920, from Goldenes Jubilaeum der St. Joseph's-Gemeinde von Nord-Minneapolis.

=== Sacred Heart Chapel ===
During the early 20th century, the Sisters of Saint Benedict's Convent saw expansion. There were about thirty new members each year. Because of the lack of space, building plans were made in 1910 to create both a new chapel and a college hall. The original Sacred Heart Chapel was officially opened on March 25, 1914.

The chapel, in Beaux-Arts style, is the most prominent building in the town. It was designed by architect George Stauduhar. The ribbed dome is 135 feet (41 m) high, rests on a base surrounded by Ionic columns, and incorporates several oculus windows. The main altar is located directly below the dome. At the time, the roof was supported by sixteen granite columns.

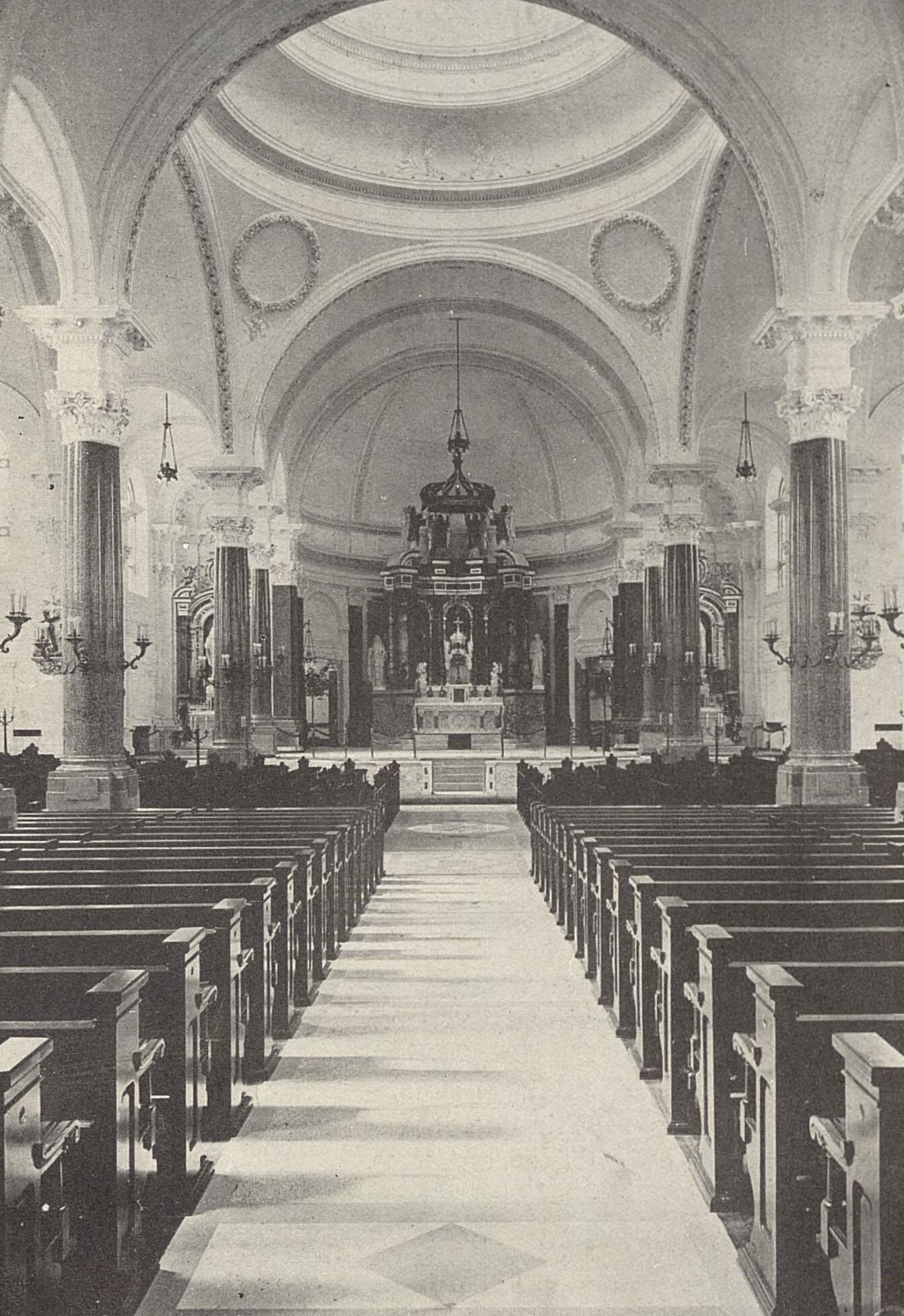
Interior of Sacred Heart Chapel, St. Joseph, Minnesota, circa 1920, from Goldenes Jubilaeum der St. Joseph's-Gemeinde von Nord-Minneapolis.

In 1981, the Benedictine Monastery decided that they wanted a space that reflected their new awareness of modern Benedictine spirituality. The chapel was extensively renovated, which involved rearrangement of the seating and the removal of eight of the granite columns. The columns that were removed were incorporated into the Gathering Place, an addition to the west side of the chapel. The Gathering Place hosts liturgical, social, and educational events; an oratory for the prayer of the Divine Office; and the monastery's archives. The renovation was designed by Hammel, Green and Abrahamson, with Frank Kacmarcik consulting on liturgy and design. By the spring of 1983, the new Sacred Heart Chapel was complete, with a final cost of $4.5 million. The Sacred Heart Chapel is an important symbol of Benedictine tradition and demonstrates how the Benedictine heritage can meet modern spiritual vitality.

== Outreach ==
A commitment to education led the Sisters to open and staff schools in Central Minnesota and abroad, including in Native American communities. Since 1857, 1,653 Sisters have taught in 163 elementary and secondary schools located primarily in the Diocese of St. Cloud.

The Sisters’ role in providing health care is reflected in the establishment and staffing of St. Cloud Hospital; the Queen of Peace Hospital in New Prague, Minnesota; the St. Cloud School of Nursing; a school of anesthesia, a school of x-ray technology, St. Benedict's Senior Community, and other institutions.

A key development in the history of Saint Benedict's Monastery has been its role in the founding of other independent houses of Benedictine women in the United States and abroad. It is a member of the Federation of St. Benedict, which includes Saint Benedict's Monastery, St. Joseph, Minn.; St. Paul's Monastery, St. Paul, Minn.; St. Placid Priory, Lacey, Wash.; St. Mary Monastery, Rock Island, Ill.; Annunciation Monastery, Bismarck, North Dakota; St. Scholastica Monastery, Duluth, Minn.; Saint Benedict's Monastery, Muroran, Hokkaido, Japan; Saint Benedict's Monastery, Tamsui, New Taipei, Taiwan; Saint Martin Monastery, Nassau, NP The Bahamas; Mount Benedict Monastery, Ogden, Utah; and Monasterio Santa Escolastica, Humacao, Puerto Rico. In addition, Saint Benedict's Monastery founded three Native American missions in Minnesota.

The Sisters are involved in Benedictine Friends, a program that connects students at the College of St. Benedict with the Monastery. The program is meant to engage the spirituality of students by allowing them to meet and bond with the Sisters.

== Notable Sisters ==
- Sister Annella Zervas (1900–1926), a nun of St. Benedict's who died after an inspirational battle against the excruciatingly painful and disfiguring skin affliction Pityriasis rubra pilaris, has been recognized by the Church as a Servant of God. In October 2023, Bishop Andrew Cozzens of the Diocese of Crookston announced that preliminary steps are already being taken towards formally opening Sister Annella Zervas' Cause for Roman Catholic Sainthood.

== Art and Heritage Place ==
The Sisters opened the Art and Heritage Place in 2000 to share their art and history. The Haehn Museum features a rotating annual exhibit about the lives and ministries of the Sisters of the Order of Saint Benedict; it includes their influence locally, around the state, and around the world. The Whitby Gift Shop and Gallery offers four art exhibits a year, in addition to selling works by the Sisters and local artists.

== Spirituality Center ==
The Sisters operate the Spirituality Center for individual and group retreats, programs, and spiritual direction. Known for its spiritual direction internship, the Spirituality Center has trained people in the art of spiritual direction and provides access to spiritual directors. It also holds daily sessions and regular workshops in centering prayer, a form of Christian meditation. A number of other programs and retreats are offered throughout the year. Since 2007, the Spirituality Center has operated Subiaco Hermitage, a cabin on the property for individual retreats.
