= New Hudson Ballpark =

Proposed baseball stadium in Hudson, Wisconsin, U.S.

- Location within Wisconsin Location within the United States
- Interactive map of New Hudson Ballpark
- Address: 2200 Carmichael Rd. Hudson, Wisconsin 54016
- Coordinates: 44°56′48″N 92°43′32″W
- Capacity: 1,400

Tenant
- St. Croix River Hounds (NWL)

New Hudson Ballpark is a proposed ballpark to be built in Hudson, Wisconsin. It was planned to be the home of the St. Croix River Hounds, a collegiate summer baseball team that was scheduled to play in the Northwoods League. The new stadium would have been part of a multi-use campus planned for the old 130-acre St. Croix Meadows dog track, a facility which was in business from 1991 to 2001, and which was unused afterwards.

It was reported in July 2017 that construction could start the next month, with ticket sales starting that September and the stadium opening in May 2018. The St. Croix Meadows dog track was demolished in January 2018 to make room for the new Hudson Gateway development. In October 2019, baseball stadium construction was set to begin in the spring of 2020. In May 2020, construction was to begin "this summer". As of April 29, 2021, ballpark construction had not begun, but the team still had "the intention to begin the build this year." In July 2022, a revised development plan was presented that would call for a 1,400 seat facility that could open as soon as June 2023.

As of October 2023, the St. Croix River Hounds' website had been taken offline and the team was no longer listed as an expansion franchise on the league's website. In February 2025, a league spokesman said that was due to "a redesign of the site. I think that was more of taking the logo down without knowing exactly when they were hoping to break ground and have a facility. That was the only reason that was taken down." He added that "the intention is for the River Hounds to play in 2026."
