= Joan Chittister =

Roman Catholic nun, activist, writer and academic

Joan Chittister O.S.B.
- Born: Joan Daugherty; April 26, 1936 (age 90); DuBois, Pennsylvania, U.S.
- Education: University of Notre Dame; Penn State University
- Title: Roman Catholic nun
- Website: joanchittister.org

Joan Daugherty Chittister O.S.B. (born April 26, 1936), is an American Benedictine nun, theologian, writer, and speaker. She has served as a Benedictine prioress, Benedictine federation president, president of the Leadership Conference of Women Religious, and co-chair of the Global Peace Initiative of Women.

== Biography ==
=== Early life ===
Chittister was born on April 26, 1936, to Daniel and Loretta Daugherty. Her father died when she was very young and her mother married Harold Chittister. Joan Chittister described her step-father as a violently abusive alcoholic.

=== Education ===
She was educated by Sisters of St. Joseph, and later attended St. Benedict Academy in Erie, Pennsylvania. She earned a bachelor's degree in English at Mercyhurst University, graduating in 1962, a master's degree in communication arts from the University of Notre Dame, graduating in 1968, and a Ph.D. in speech communication theory from Penn State University, graduating in 1971. She is also an elected fellow of St. Edmunds College at the University of Cambridge.

=== Career ===
Chittister entered religious life in 1957, at age 21. Within her first week, she contracted polio, which put her in an iron lung for several months; it took four years for her to fully recover.

In 1971, Chittister was elected president of the Federation of St. Scholastica, a federation of twenty monasteries of Benedictine women in the United States and Mexico, established in 1922. She was a prioress of the Benedictine Sisters of Erie, Pennsylvania, for 12 years and was a past president of the Leadership Conference of Women Religious. She served as co-chair of the Global Peace Initiative of Women (2016–2019), an inclusive international network of spiritual and community leaders. With this organization, she works to bring a spiritual perspective to conflict resolution fueled by pressing economic and ecological crises across the globe.

Chittister says that women's ordination has never been her primary focus. Her books deal with monasticism, justice and equality especially for women in church and society, interfaith topics, peace and others. She has won 16 Catholic Press Association awards for her books and numerous other awards for her work, including 12 honorary degrees from US universities. She writes a column for the National Catholic Reporter, "From Where I Stand".

Penn State University holds the Joan D. Chittister Literary Archives. A biography of Chittister was released by Orbis Books in October 2015, Joan Chittister: Her Journey from Certainty to Faith by Tom Roberts.

== Controversies ==
Chittister's stances on contraception and women's ordination are known to contradict the official teachings of the Catholic Church. She was one of two nuns prohibited by Church authorities from attending the first Women's Ordination Worldwide conference on June 30, 2001. However, she not only attended, but gave the opening address. In another instance, Chittister rejected the Church's strictures against the 23 nuns who ran an advertisement in the New York Times attacking the Church's teaching on abortion.

== Bibliography ==
Chittister has authored over 50 books and over 700 articles in numerous journals and magazines including: America, U.S. Catholic, Sojourners, Spirituality (Dublin), and The Tablet (London). She is a regular contributor to the National Catholic Reporter and HuffPost, appeared on Oprah Winfrey's Super Soul Sunday in March 2015 and in May 2019, on Meet the Press with Tim Russert and Now with Bill Moyers.

She is the executive director of "Benetvision", a publications ministry of the Benedictine Sisters of Erie.

=== Recent publications ===
Joan Chittister: Essential Writings, a compilation from her best writing from books, articles and speeches, was published by Orbis Books in August 2014 (ed. Mary Lou Kownacki, OSB, Mary Hembrow Snyder, PhD). In 2015, Dear Joan: conversations with women in the church was published by Garratt Publishing.

- Called to Community: The Life Jesus Wants for His People (contributor) (Plough Publishing House) (2024) ISBN 978-1-63608-093-2
- Illuminated Life: Monastic Wisdom for Seekers of Light (Orbis Books) (2024) ISBN 978-1-57075-233-9
- Awakenings: Prophetic Reflections (Orbis) (2022) ISBN 978-1-62698-464-6
- The Monastic Heart: 50 Simple Practices for a Contemplative and Fulfilling Life (Hodder and Stroughton) (2022) ISBN 978-1-3998-0085-3
- In God's Holy Light: Wisdom from the Desert Monastics (Franciscan Media) (2022) ISBN 978-1-63253-434-7
- An Evolving God, an Evolving Purpose, an Evolving World. 1517 Media. 2022-05-10. ISBN 978-1-5064-8461-7.
- The Time Is Now: A Call to Uncommon Courage. Crown Publishing Group. 2019-03-05. ISBN 978-1-9848-2341-0.
- OSB, Joan Chittister (2019). What Are You Looking For?: Seeking the God Who Is Seeking You. Paulist Press. ISBN 978-1-58768-788-4.
- A Little Rule for Beginners, Benetvision, Erie (2018).
- We are All One: Reflections on Unity, Community and Commitment to Each Other. Twenty-Third Publications. 2018. ISBN 978-1-62785-366-8.
- Radical Spirit: 12 Ways to Live a Free and Authentic Life. Crown Publishing Group. 2017-04-25. ISBN 978-0-451-49517-4.
- Two Dogs and a Parrot, BlueBridge (2015).
- In God's Holy Light, Franciscan Media: Cincinnati, OH (2015).
- Between the Dark and the Daylight, Image Books (2015)
- Our Holy Yearnings, Twenty-Third Publications. (2014)
- A Passion for Life, (New release) Orbis (2013)
- For Everything a Season, (New release of There is a Season), Orbis (2013)
- The Way of the Cross, Orbis Books: Maryknoll, NY (2013)
- The Sacred In-Between, Twenty-Third Publications (2013)
- Following the Path: The Search for a Life of Passion, Purpose, and Joy. Crown Publishing Group. 2012-04-17. ISBN 978-0-307-95398-8.
- Happiness. Grand Rapids, MI: Wm. B. Eerdmans Publishing. 2011-09-23. ISBN 978-0-8028-6481-9.
- The Radical Christian Life, Liturgical Press. (2011)
- The Monastery of the Heart: An Invitation to a Meaningful Life. BlueBridge. 2011. ISBN 978-1-933346-34-2.
- God's Tender Mercy: Reflections on Forgiveness. Mystic, CT: Twenty-Third Publications. 2010. ISBN 978-1-58595-799-6.
- The Rule of Benedict: A Spirituality for the 21st Century. Crossroad Publishing Company. 2010. ISBN 978-0-8245-2594-1.; revised edition
- Uncommon Gratitude, Liturgical Press: Collegeville, MN. (2010)
- The Liturgical Year, Thomas Nelson: Nashville, TN. (2009)
- The Gift of Years, Blue Bridge (2008)
- In Search of Belief, Liguori, (2006)
- Called to Question: A Spiritual Memoir. Sheed & Ward. 2004-04-24. ISBN 978-1-58051-225-1.
