= Tom Quinlan =

American baseball player

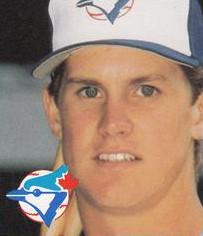
- Quinlan in 1988
- Third baseman
- Born: March 27, 1968 (age 58); Saint Paul, Minnesota, U.S.
- Batted: Right Threw: Right

Professional debut
- MLB: September 4, 1990, for the Toronto Blue Jays
- KBO: April 5, 2000, for the Hyundai Unicorns

Last appearance
- MLB: April 6, 1996, for the Minnesota Twins
- KBO: April 21, 2002, for the LG Twins

MLB statistics
- Batting average: .155
- Home runs: 1
- Runs batted in: 5

KBO statistics
- Batting average: .233
- Home runs: 65
- Runs batted in: 157
- Stats at Baseball Reference

Teams
- Toronto Blue Jays (1990, 1992); Philadelphia Phillies (1994); Minnesota Twins (1996); Hyundai Unicorns (2000–2001); LG Twins (2002)

Career highlights and awards
- World Series champion (1992); Korean Series champion (2000); Korean Series MVP (2000)
Medals
Men's baseball
Representing United States
World Junior Baseball Championship
Bronze medal – third place	1986 Windsor	Team

Thomas Raymond Quinlan (born March 27, 1968) is an American former third baseman in Major League Baseball. Quinlan spent parts of four seasons in the major leagues with the Toronto Blue Jays, Philadelphia Phillies and Minnesota Twins. He is the older brother of Robb Quinlan, also a former Major League Baseball player.

Quinlan was a two-sport star in high school. He was also drafted by the National Hockey League's Calgary Flames in the 4th round, 79th overall in the 1986 NHL entry draft. Quinlan had committed to play both college baseball and college hockey for the Minnesota Golden Gophers and had enrolled at the school and started practicing with both teams before ultimately signing with the Blue Jays before classes began. Quinlan became the first foreign-born Korean Series MVP when he led the Hyundai Unicorns to their Korean Series championship in 2000.

Tom and Robb Quinlan were part of the ownership group for the St. Croix River Hounds, a collegiate summer baseball team intended to play at Hudson, Wisconsin in the Northwoods League. First reported on in July 2017, the team was removed from the Northwoods League website in 2023.
