= Launay =

- Commune
- Coat of arms
- Location of Launay
- Location within France Location within Normandy
- Coordinates: 49°06′12″N 0°44′36″E
- Country: France
- Region: Normandy
- Department: Eure
- Arrondissement: Bernay
- Canton: Brionne

Government
  - Mayor (2020–2026): Christian Baïsse
- Area^{1}: 2.26 km^{2} (0.87 sq mi)
- Elevation: 85 m (279 ft)
- Highest elevation: 110 m (360 ft)
- Lowest elevation: 70 m (230 ft)
- Population (2023): 177
  - Density: 78.3/km^{2} (203/sq mi)
- Time zone: UTC+01:00 (CET)
  - Summer (DST): UTC+02:00 (CEST)
- INSEE/Postal code: 27364 /27470
- ^{1} French Land Register data, which excludes lakes, ponds, glaciers > 1 km^{2} (0.386 sq mi or 247 acres) and river estuaries.

Launay (French pronunciation: [lonɛ]) is a commune in the Eure department in Normandy in northern France.

== Geography ==
The commune along with another 69 communes shares part of a 4,747 hectare, Natura 2000 conservation area, called Risle, Guiel, Charentonne.

== Population ==
Historical population
Year	Pop.	±% p.a.
1968	197	—
1975	197	+0.00%
1982	166	−2.42%
1990	202	+2.48%
1999	216	+0.75%
2007	214	−0.12%
2012	213	−0.09%
2017	200	−1.25%
2023	177	−2.02%
Source: INSEE

== See also ==
- Communes of the Eure department
