= John Schlimm =

John Schlimm (born December 1, 1971) is an American author and educator.

== Early years ==
John was born in St. Marys, Pennsylvania and resides there. The great-great-grandson of Straub Brewery Founder Peter Straub, he grew up within walking distance of his family's brewery.

== Memoir: Five Years in Heaven ==
In 2015, John released his first memoir, Five Years in Heaven: The Unlikely Friendship That Answered Life’s Greatest Questions. The book chronicles John's friendship with an aged nun. The book received a Christopher Award in 2016.

== Early career ==
During his early career in the 1990s, John served in the Vice Presidential Communications Office at The White House where he worked with Second Lady Tipper Gore as well as having worked in production and scriptwriting for the national radio series Enterprising Women, fundraising for various national and local non-profits, and country music PR at FrontPage Publicity in Nashville where he worked with Naomi Judd and other superstars.

In 2003, John joined the faculty at the University of Pittsburgh at Bradford as an adjunct professor in the Communication and the Arts Department.

== Community involvement ==
In 2013, Schlimm delivered a keynote address titled "Embrace Compassion, Change the World" on Capitol Hill at the Congressional Vegetarian Staff Association luncheon.

== Education ==
In 2002, John graduated with a master's degree in education from Harvard University.

== Bibliography ==
- Extraordinary Dogs: Stories from Search and Rescue Dogs, Comfort Dogs, and Other Canine Heroes (with Liz Stavrinides), St. Martin's Press, 2019. ISBN 9781250201409
- Moonshine: A Celebration of America's Original Rebel Spirit, Citadel Press, 2018. ISBN 9780806539195
- Five Years in Heaven: The Unlikely Friendship That Answered Life's Greatest Questions, Image Books, 2015. ISBN 978-0553446579.
- The Ultimate Beer Lover's Happy Hour, Sourcebooks/Cumberland House, 2014. ISBN 9781402296321
- The Cheesy Vegan, DaCapo/Lifelong, 2013. ISBN 9781322540153
- Stand Up!: 75 Young Activists Who Rock the World, And How You Can, Too!, Publishing Syndicate, 2013. ISBN 9780985060299
- Grilling Vegan Style, DaCapo/Lifelong, 2012. ISBN 9780738215723
- The Tipsy Vegan, DaCapo/Lifelong, 2011. ISBN 9780738215075
- Twang: A Novel, Amazon Digital Services, 2011. ISBN 9780578085456
- Harrah's Entertainment Presents...The Seven Stars Cookbook, Chronicle Books, 2010. ISBN 9780811874755
- The Beer Lover's Cookbook, Sourcebooks, Inc./Cumberland House Publishing, 2009. ISBN 9781402230936
- The Ultimate Beer Lover's Cookbook, Cumberland House Publishing, 2008. ISBN 9781581826517
- Straub Brewery (Images of America: Pennsylvania), Arcadia Publishing, 2005. ISBN 9780738538433.
- The Pennsylvania Celebrities Cookbook, Stohn Books, 2005. ISBN 9780975251539.
- The Straub Beer Party Drinks Handbook, Stohn Books, 2004. ISBN 9780975251522.
- The Straub Beer Cookbook, Stohn Books, 2003. ISBN 9780975251508.
- Corresponding With History: The Art & Benefits of Collecting Autographs, ETC Publications, 1996. ISBN 9780882801308.
