= Benedictine Sisters of Jesus Crucified =

The Benedictine Sisters of Jesus Crucified are a congregation of contemplative Benedictine Religious Sisters which was founded in France in 1930. Their particular gift has been to make monastic life possible for women who might not normally be admitted to a monastery due to their state of health or their having a physical disability by all candidates deemed capable of living a monastic life regardless of their physical condition. For this they follow the Rule of St. Benedict with certain adaptations to make this possible.

== History ==
The Abbé Maurice Gaucheron (died 29 March 1951) was a priest serving at the famed Basilica of the Sacred Heart in the Montmartre sector of Paris, France, during the 1920s. In the course of his ministry, he came to know a number of women who longed to become nuns but could not find a monastery which would accept them due to their health or physical handicaps.

Gaucheron came to see in illness and physical fragility a means of following Jesus and thus a legitimate way of living the contemplative life. He shared this vision with Suzanne Wrotnowska, a Polish immigrant in France, who felt called to share in establishing such a religious community. The two began to seek out other women who either would support this unique way of monastic life or were in need of it. On 11 April 1930, Wrotnowska and several other women dedicated their lives to the future congregation in the course of a Mass in the crypt of the basilica at Montmartre. At that point, Wrotnowska became Mother Marie des Douleurs.

In 1933 they were able to open their first monastery, St. Joseph Priory, in the town of Brou-sur-Chantereine, near Paris, which served as the motherhouse of the congregation. They were recognized as a religious community by the local bishop, Frédéric Lamy, the Bishop of Meaux, in September of that same year. They were formally created a religious institute in 1938 under the name of the Sisters of Jesus Crucified, and Mother Marie des Douleurs was elected the first prioress of the community. By 1936 the community had grown to such an extent that a new monastery was established in Tournai, Belgium. It was closed, however, in 1940 due to the outbreak of World War II

After the war, the growth of the congregation was swift, with the members of the congregation reaching 130 by 1951. The congregation had received formal recognition by the Holy See on 22 April 1950. Eventually nine monasteries were founded throughout France. A monastery was founded in the United States in 1955 in Devon, Pennsylvania, followed by another in Newport, Rhode Island, in 1962. A monastery was founded in Castle Cary, England, called St John's Priory in 1959 by six of the sisters, but later closed in 1994. In 1960 a monastery was opened in Japan, as well as one in Saint-James, in Normandy, on the site of an 11th-century priory, which had served as a resting spot along the pilgrimage route to the Abbey of Mont-Saint-Michel. By 1980, the number of Sisters had reached 210.

In 1984 the congregation was admitted into the Benedictine Confederation, an umbrella body of the Benedictine monasteries of men and women around the world. With this step, the congregation was able at last formally to call itself Benedictine.

== Current ==
Due to challenges with aging facilities and an increasing number of Sisters requiring accommodations, the two American communities were merged in 2001 to form a new monastery in Branford, Connecticut, called the Monastery of the Glorious Cross. It was located on the grounds of the former Connecticut Hospice—the first hospice in the United States—with renovations made for wheelchair accessibility, as well as a chapel and bell tower.

As of 2012 the congregation had four monasteries. The number of monasteries in France was reduced to two: the motherhouse in Brou-sur-Chantereine, and another in Saint-James, a village in Normandy. The monasteries in Japan and the United States continued.

In 2024, the General Chapter of the congregation elected to merge with the Missionary Benedictine Sisters of St. Bathilde, whose motherhouse is located in Vanves, near Paris, France. At that time, the decision was made to close the monasteries in Normandy and the United States.
