= Benedictine Sisters of Erie =

Benedictine priory in Erie, Pennsylvania

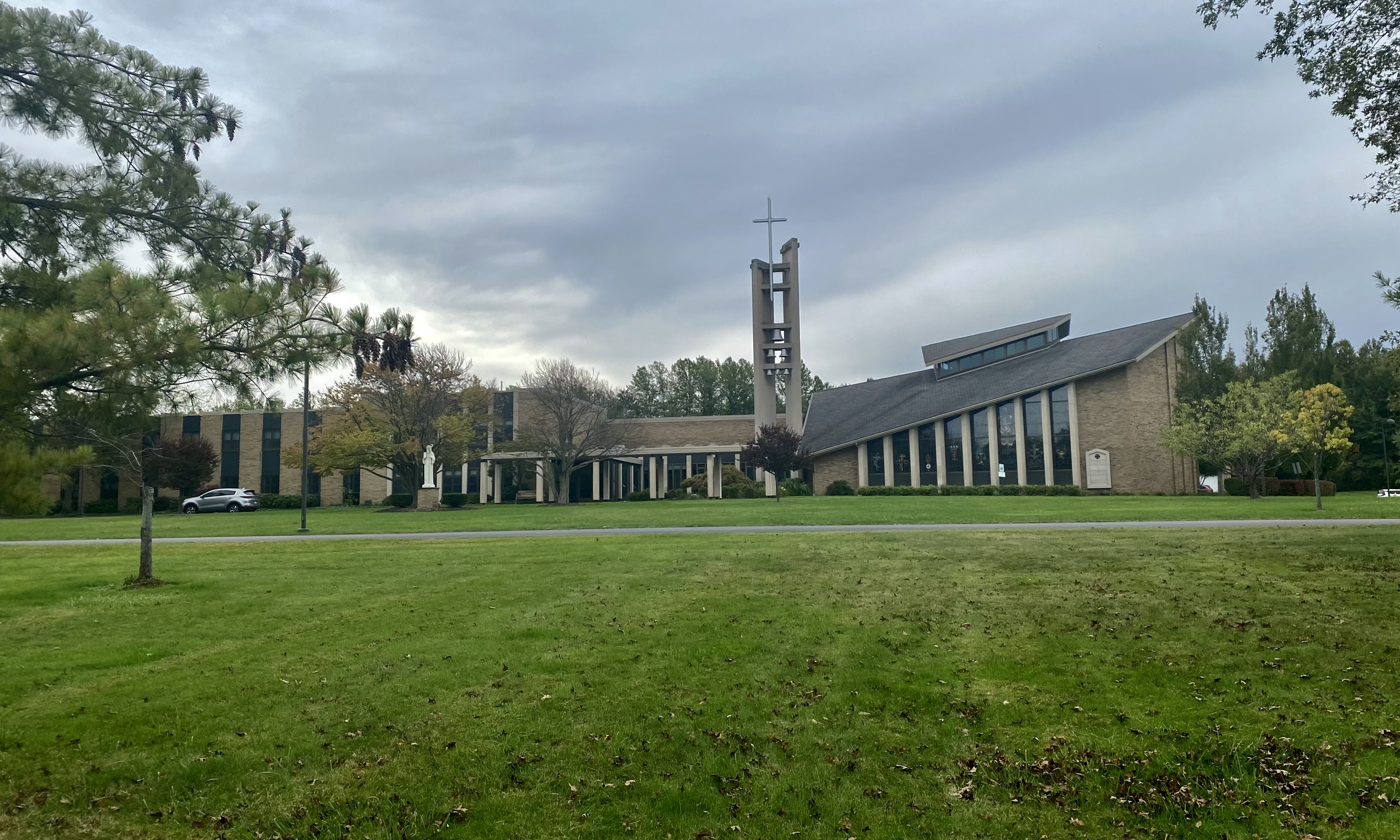
- Mount Saint Benedict Monastery, home of the Benedictine Sisters of Erie
- Formation: 1856
- Type: Catholic religious order
- Headquarters: Erie, Pennsylvania, U.S.
- Members: 100 as of 2015
- Parent organization: Order of Saint Benedict
- Website: https://eriebenedictines.org

The Benedictine Sisters of Erie are a Benedictine priory in Erie, Pennsylvania. They are known for their social and anti-war activism.

== History ==
Mother Benedicta Rapp and five Benedictine sisters arrived in Erie in June 1856, where they established the first daughter house of the Benedictine Sisters of Elk County, with Scholastica Burkhard appointed as Mother Superior. Initially based out of a small chapel, in 1860 a three-story brick building was built, which was used as a convent and a parochial school. The community soon outgrew this building, and in 1868 and 1869 another brick building was built, this time on 10th Street, to be used as a school. This allowed the older brick building to be used solely by the sisters. The sisters funded construction of several additional buildings as the demand for space for more pupils increased.

=== 1960 - 1979 ===
In 1966, the Sisters put together a musical performance that sold out concerts in Erie. They were then invited to appear on a January 1967 episode of The Ed Sullivan Show, under the group name "Sisters-66".

In June 1971, the priory began running the John XXIII Home For Senior Citizens. In 1994, the Sisters handed the operation over to a lay person.

In the 1970s, the Sisters began updating their prayer books to remove the usage of exclusively male pronouns for God.

During the Vietnam War, the Sisters refused to allow military recruiters to visit St. Benedict Academy. Sister Mary Lou Kownacki organized "die-ins" around Erie in protest of the war.

=== 1980 - 1999 ===
In 1980, the Sisters used some of their remaining finances to dig a natural gas well near the priory; the well was successful, allowing the priory to fuel itself with natural gas. Mobil Corporation later reached out to ask if they could include the Sisters' story in an advertisement; the priory turned down the request, due to the corporation's alleged breaking of a boycott against Rhodesia. When Mobil ran an ad referencing the Sisters anyway in 1981, they brought their complaints to the press. In November 1982, the priory installed a wind generator, in order to continue to harness local natural resources.

Also in 1980, the priory organized the first Good Friday pilgrimage walk through Erie. The walk has been used to express discontent with global conflicts; in 1999, for example, the walk was used to draw attention to the conflict in Kosovo.

In July 1986, the Sisters signed onto a lawsuit against the Pennsylvania Department of Environmental Protection and Bureau of State Parks, which alleged that the state was in violation of the state sewage facility act. By late 1986, the priory had a group of nuns who had trained as clowns, who performed both at Erie events and at some priory services.

In 1991, during a local radio show segment, the Benedictine Sisters were voted "bad guy" of the day due to their staunch antiwar efforts; their opponent in the competition was Saddam Hussein.

In October 1999, the Benedictine Sisters, along with the local Sisters of Mercy and Sisters of St. Joseph, began holding Take Back The Site vigils. The vigils, held at sites of homicides, aim to "reclaim the sites for nonviolence". In December 1999, the Sisters announced the Benedicta Riepp Program, which would allow women to temporarily join the Sisters for up to four years.

=== 2000 - present ===
In 2001, one of the Sisters, Sister Joan Chittister, spoke at a conference in favor of women's ordination, in violation of a Vatican decree. All but one of the 128 Benedictine Sisters of Erie, including Prioress Christine Vladimiroff, signed a letter in support of Chittister.

In 2015, the Sisters had 100 members.

In 2024, a Republican Party operative on X accused the Sisters of voter fraud, claiming that 53 voters were registered at the Sister's priory, based on the misunderstanding that no voters lived there. The Sisters refuted the accusations, and emphasized their nonpartisan status amid rising election misinformation in Pennsylvania.

== Education ==
In 1869, the Sisters opened St. Benedict Academy in Erie, which they continued to run until its closing in 1988 from low enrollment. In the early 20th century, the Sisters also ran six parochial schools in the region.

In 1989, the Sisters opened the school the St. Benedict Education Center in Erie County, which also serves students from Clarion, Crawford, Forest, Venango, and Warren counties.

The Sisters also run the Saint Benedict Child Care Center, which originated as a Head Start program run out of the former convent building. In 1969, they expanded to offer an after-school program. In 1984, they took over administration of the East Coast Migrant Head Start program. By 1982, the programs were run from their current location, which was renovated in 1992. Following the expansion, the Sisters also took on state program Pre K Counts.

== Outreach ==
In 1981, the Benetwood Apartments were opened on the priory's property as part of a federal Housing and Urban Development program. The 75 apartments are home primarily to seniors and low-income disabled residents.

In 1994, the Sisters opened the Inner City Neighborhood Art House, which offers art classes and programs for children.

The Saint Benedictine Community Center is a recreational facility in Erie, which is used by several local social service groups.

== Notable members ==
- Joan Chittister
- Mary Lou Kownacki
- Mary Louise St. John
- Christine Vladimiroff (prioress 1998-2010)
