= St. Benedict Academy (Erie, Pennsylvania) =

Private, all-female school in Erie, Pennsylvania, US

Location
- 320 East Tenth Street; Erie, Erie County, Pennsylvania 16503; United States

Information
- Type: Private, All-Female
- Religious affiliation: Roman Catholic
- Established: 1869
- Closed: 1988
- Authority: Benedictine Sisters (O. S. B.)
- Grades: 9-12
- Campus type: Urban
- Colors: Blue & White
- Athletics: Basketball, Soccer
- Athletics conference: Metro League
- Nickname: Lassies
- Rival: Villa Maria Academy
- Newspaper: Bene Dictum

St. Benedict Academy was an all-girls' high school that was located in the city of Erie, Pennsylvania. The school operated from 1869 until 1988 and was run by the Benedictine Sisters of Erie.

== Beginnings ==
The Benedictine Sisters of Erie began the first Catholic high school for women in the city of Erie, St. Benedict Academy. The school opened in 1869 with one teacher, two students and a tuition of $1/month. The curriculum consisted of Christian Doctrine, English, Sacred History, Drawing, Music and Embroidery.

The dedication of the new three-story building for boarders and day students took place on December 8, 1870, less than two years after the first day of school.

Boarders, as well as day students, were accepted at the school until 1920, when the school eliminated its grammar school grades. The school was accredited by the Pennsylvania Department of Public Instruction in 1922.

== New building ==
Bishop John Mark Gannon asked the Benedictine Sisters in 1951 if they would like to increase their school population for the improvement of Catholic education in Erie.

The groundbreaking for the new academy was held on September 18, 1953, with the bishop in attendance. The dedication of the new academy was held on December 8, 1955, the feast of the Immaculate Conception, which was also 85 years to the day of the dedication of the first academy.

The new Saint Benedict Academy opened its first classes in September 1955 with an enrollment of 459 students representing 19 parishes. The academy closed in 1988.
