= Abbot Primate =

Benedictine ecclesial office within the Catholic Church

Abbot Primate of Order of St. Benedict
- Incumbent; Abbot Jeremias Schröder OSB since 14 September 2024
- Member of: Catholic Church
- Reports to: Benedictine Confederation
- Residence: Sant'Anselmo all'Aventino, Rome, Italy
- Term length: 1st term for eight years; Can be reelected for four-year terms thereafter for a maximum service of 16 years
- Constituting instrument: Lex Propria Confoederationis Benedictinae
- Website: www.osb.org

The abbot primate of the Order of St. Benedict serves as the elected representative of the Benedictine Confederation of monasteries in the Catholic Church. While normally possessing no authority over individual autonomous monasteries or congregations, he does serve as a liaison to the Vatican on behalf of the Benedictines, promotes unity among Benedictine monasteries and congregations, and represents Benedictines at religious gatherings throughout the world. He resides in Rome, Italy, at the abbey of Sant'Anselmo all'Aventino which serves, because he is abbot primate, as the "Primatial Abbey of Sant'Anselmo." He appoints a rector to oversee the College of Sant'Anselmo, serves as the grand chancellor of the Pontificio Ateneo Sant'Anselmo, and appoints a rector to oversee the Church of Sant'Anselmo.

== History ==
The office of abbot primate was created in 1893 by Pope Leo XIII, who had shown a particular interest in the Benedictines of the world when he sought in 1887 to reestablish the College of Sant'Anselmo in Rome as a means of serving the education of Benedictines throughout the world. Previously, the college had only served for the education of Benedictine monks from the Cassinese congregation. Through Pope Leo XIII's assistance, land was secured in Rome and a new complex known as "Sant'Anselmo all'Aventino" was built for this new college. It was in the papal brief on 9 December 1892 that he called for all Benedictine abbots to gather in Rome for "the laying of the foundation stone of Sant'Anselmo" that was to occur on 19 April 1893. The subsequent meetings of these abbots and their representatives after that gathering centered on how to care for the new institution and whether to elect a "Repraesentans" of the Benedictine Order for a 12 year term who would also oversee the new Sant'Anselmo.

The abbots and their representatives then met with the Pope Leo XIII on 2 May 1893 after which the Pope issued a brief on 12 July 1893 (Summum Semper) that outlined his clear vision for the Benedictines. Famously having remarked that the Benedictines were an "ordo sine ordine" (an order without order), the brief outlined the new creation of a "Benedictine Confederation." This was in keeping with the previous formation of national congregations of Benedictine monasteries that had been formed since the 13th century as a means of support for each other. Even in the 19th century, autonomous monasteries had begun to join together in collaborative efforts that would see the creation of "congregations" such as the French Solesmes Congregation in 1837, the American-Cassinese Congregation in 1855, the Beuronese Congregation in 1868, the Subiaco Congregation in 1872, and the Swiss-American Congregation in 1881. Each congregation would have its own constitution and elect its own abbot president. While commendable, Pope Leo XIII sought to address the further reality that the "congregations existed side by side without any bond between them, or any semblance of a central authority." Therefore, the Pope followed a similar plan with the creation of this new international Benedictine Confederation that incorporated all the congregations without a loss of autonomy for any abbey or congregation.

On the question of leadership for this new international confederation, the Pope and the Benedictine abbots had differed because the abbots had wanted a leadership with no control over the autonomous abbeys and congregations. Their proposal was for a mere "representative" that could at least be able to also oversee the new international College of Sant'Anselmo. While Pope Leo XIII was amenable to most of their other proposals, on this one issue of leadership he differed. As one historian noted, "instead of the consciously understated title of Repraesentans for the symbolic head of the Confederation, the pope wished that the clearer title of Primas be used."

After the papal brief of 2 May 1893 established this new Benedictine Confederation with its abbot primate, the Vatican followed this with a decree in September 1893 (Inaestimabilis) that set-out the specific rights and function of the abbot primate. Firstly, the abbot primate would reside in Rome to serve as the abbot of the new complex known as the Primatial Abbey of Sant'Anselmo representing Benedictines "for businesses directly concerning the well-being of the whole order." This was, as many historians have noted, his primary responsibility. He would be elected for a twelve year term by the Benedictine abbots of the world and would have limited administrative or juridical control over individual monasteries or congregations, but would still serve to represent Benedictines to the Vatican and to the world. Next, he would serve as the "Grand Chancellor" of the newly reestablished College of Sant'Anselmo where he would govern the work on behalf of the Benedictine Confederation.

It seems clear to most historians that Pope Leo XIII at least initially envisioned establishing a superior for the Benedictines to function like those of other religious orders such as the Jesuits, Franciscans, or Dominicans. Instead, by establishing the office of the abbot primate he was willing to compromise on this vision given the concerns of the Benedictine abbots about the historic autonomy of monasteries. As one historian noted, "Pope XIII acquiesced in the abbots' thwarting his original intentions to organize a more central authority for the 'Black Monks'." Thus, "Summum Semper" of 1893 crafted a careful balance in all these needs as noted by another historian:

Everyone must be struck by the vagueness of all this, a vagueness strangely unlike the usual precision of Roman legislation--so unlike as to bear in on the mind the sense that it was intentional. And so it surely was. There can be little doubt that in 1887 Leo XIII contemplated a real unification of the Benedictines with a real general at the head. Though he abandoned such a project, he did not wholly divest himself of the idea of bringing the congregations in some way together. How this could be done seems never to have been thought out; hence the articles proposed in 1893 were a vague compromise. But the fact that the novel title of abbot primate was devised for the head is an indication that the character of his office was intended to be sought from the analogies of the primate among the bishops of a country, who is without jurisdiction over them (Codex, can 271), not from the analogies of the general of an order.

Today, the Benedictine Confederation is governed by its own Vatican approved constitution known as a Lex Propria that has been updated at various times and it, too, would outline the rights and function of the abbot primate. This lex propria is grounded in the founding documents of "Summum Semper" and "Inaestimabilis" but allows for the flexibility of emendations and provisions proposed by the Congress of abbots and approved by the Vatican. A more detailed analysis of the development and evolution of the Lex Propria is not offered here, but this guiding constitutional document outlines the rights and responsibilities for the abbot primate, the College of Abbots, the Benedictine Confederation, the Pontificio Sant'Anselmo, and the College of Sant'Anselmo.

== Benedictine institutions overseen by the abbot primate ==
While the abbot primate has minimal juridical authority over individual monasteries or congregations (unless they are one of the very few non-congregational monasteries), he does direct the work of Sant'Anselmo on the Aventine (Italian: Sant'Anselmo all'Aventino). This is the complex located on the Aventine Hill in Rome's Ripa rione and overseen by the Benedictine Confederation in the person of the abbot primate and the Synod of Abbot Presidents. This complex is sometimes referred to as the "Primatial Abbey of Sant'Anselmo" because the abbot primate resides there as abbot and he appoints a "prior" to serve on his behalf. The complex comprises the "College of Sant'Anselmo" (Italian: Collegio Sant'Anselmo), the "Pontifical Athenaeum of Saint Anselm" (Italian: Pontificio Ateneo Sant’Anselmo), the Church of Sant'Anselmo (Italian: Chiesa Sant'Anselmo), and serves as the curial headquarters of the Confederation and Abbot Primate (Italian: Badia Sant'Anselmo). The current abbot primate is Jeremias Schröder

=== College of Sant’Anselmo ===
The ecclesiastical residential College of Sant'Anselmo is juridically considered the successor of the homonymous college of the Cassinese Benedictine Congregation which was founded in 1687. The present college was reestablished in 1887 and moved to the newly constructed "Sant'Anselmo" on the Aventine Hill in 1896. Today the residential college houses an average of one hundred Benedictine monks from about forty countries, as well as other religious, diocesan priests, and lay people. As a house of formation, it offers a monastic environment for those who study at the onsite Pontifical Athenaeum of Saint Anselm or at other Roman pontifical universities. When the abbot primate appoints his Prior, this monk also serves concurrently as the Rector of the college. The present Rector is Rev. Brendan Coffey, O.S.B.

=== Pontifical Athenaeum of Sant'Anselmo ===
The Anselmianum, also known as the Pontifical Athenaeum of Saint Anselm (Italian: Pontificio Ateneo Sant'Anselmo; Latin: Pontificium Athenaeum Anselmianum), is the pontifical university in Rome associated with the Benedictines. The institution includes faculties of Philosophy, Theology (Sacramental Theology, Monastic Studies), the Institute of Historical Theology, as well as the Pontifical Institute of Liturgy. It grants certificates and diplomas in various subjects, as well as Bachelor, Licentiate, and Doctoral degrees. Originally the university exclusively served only Benedictines, but now is open to external students. The abbot primate is officially the "Grand Chancellor" of the Athenaeum and the present Rector of the Athenaeum is Rev. Jákó Örs Fehérváry, O.S.B.

=== Church of Sant'Anselmo ===
The Church which was consecrated on 11 November 1900 and is constructed of three naves, divided by granite columns, and includes one main altar and two side altars. A large section on the east and west ends near the apse includes the traditional stalls for the monastic choir. The church serves as a place of worship for the Benedictine residential college community and the students of the Athenaeum. It is also known, especially to the Romans, for the performances of Gregorian chant offered by the monks during the Sunday liturgical celebrations of Vespers. Since 1962, the church has also been the starting point of the penitential procession presided over by the Pope on Ash Wednesday, and which ends at the basilica of Santa Sabina where the first "Station Mass" of Lent is celebrated. The abbot primate has appointed the Rev. Sebastian Paul, O.S.B. as the present Rector of the church.

== List of abbots primate ==
No.	Abbot Primate	Portrait	Took office	Left office	Home Abbey	Vital Dates
1	Hildebrand de Hemptinne		1893	1913	Beuron Archabbey	born 10 June 1849; professed as a monk at Beuron Archabbey 15 August 1870; ordained a priest 11 June 1872; elected Abbot of Maredsous Abbey 9 August 1890; blessed at Abbey of Montecassino 5 October 1890; nominated as first Abbot Primate 12 July 1893 by Pope Leo XIII; died at Beuron Archabbey 13 August 1913; buried in the church of Beuron Archabbey
2	Fidelis von Stotzingen		1913	1947	Beuron Archabbey	born 1 May 1871; professed as a monk at Beuron Archabbey 25 January 1892; ordained a priest 27 September 1897; elected Abbot of Maria Laach Abbey 31 October 1901; blessed 11 November 1901; elected Coadjutor Abbot Primate 13 May 1913; succeeded 13 August 1913; died at Rome, Italy, 9 January 1947; buried in the Collegio Sant'Anselmo vault at the Campo Verano Cemetery in Rome, Italy
3	Bernard Kälin		1947	1959	Muri-Gries Abbey	born 21 March 1887; professed as a monk at Muri-Gries Abbey 5 October 1909; ordained a priest 18 October 1912; elected Abbot of Muri-Gries 10 August 1945; blessed 13 August 1945; elected Abbot Primate 16 September 1947; died at Muri-Gries 20 October 1962, buried in Sarnen, Switzerland
4	Benno Gut		1959	1967	Einsiedeln Abbey	born 1 April 1897; professed as a monk at Einsiedeln Abbey 6 January 1918; ordained a priest 10 July 1921; elected Abbot Ordinary of Einsiedeln 15 April 1947; blessed 5 May 1947; elected Abbot Primate 24 September 1959; created Cardinal S.R.E. 26 June 1967; died at Rome 8 December 1970; buried in Einsiedeln, Switzerland
5	Rembert Weakland		1967	1977	Saint Vincent Archabbey	born 2 April 1927; professed as a monk at Saint Vincent Archabbey 23 September 1946; ordained a priest 24 June 1951; elected Abbot Coadjutor of Saint Vincent Archabbey 26 June 1963; blessed 29 August 1963; elected Abbot Primate 29 September 1967; nominated Archbishop of the Archdiocese of Milwaukee 17 September 1977; consecrated 8 November 1977; retired 24 May 2002
6	Viktor Josef Dammertz		1977	1992	St. Ottilien Archabbey	born 8 June 1929; professed as a monk at St. Ottilien Archabbey 16 September 1954; ordained a priest 21 September 1957; elected Archabbot of St. Ottilien Archabbey 8 January 1975; blessed 2 February 1975; elected Abbot Primate 22 September 1977; nominated Bishop of the Diocese of Augsburg 24 December 1992; consecrated 30 January 1993; resignation accepted 9 June 2004
7	Jerome Theisen		1992	1995	Saint John's Abbey	born 30 December 1930; professed as a monk at Saint John's Abbey, Collegeville 11 July 1952; ordained a priest 28 July 1957; elected Abbot of Saint John's Abbey, Collegeville 22 August 1979; blessed 19 October 1979; elected Abbot Primate 19 September 1992; died at Rome 11 September 1995; buried at Saint John's Abbey, Collegeville, MN, United States
8	Marcel Rooney		1996	2000	Conception Abbey	born 20 September 1937; professed as a monk at Conception Abbey 12 September 1958; ordained a priest 21 September 1963; elected Abbot of Conception Abbey 14 April 1993; blessed 10 May 1993; elected Abbot Primate 18 September 1996; resigned 3 September 2000
9	Notker Wolf		2000	2016	St. Ottilien Archabbey	born 21 June 1940; professed as a monk at St. Ottilien Archabbey 17 September 1962; ordained a priest 1 September 1968; elected Archabbot of St. Ottilien Archabbey 1 October 1977; blessed 22 October 1977; elected Abbot Primate 7 September 2000; emeritus, 9 September 2016
10	Gregory Polan		2016	2024	Conception Abbey	born 2 January 1950; professed as a monk at Conception Abbey 28 August 1971; ordained a priest 26 May 1977; elected Abbot of Conception Abbey 6 November 1996; blessed 9 December 1996; elected Abbot Primate 10 September 2016; resigned 13 September 2024
11	Jeremias Schröder		2024	present	St. Ottilien Archabbey	born 8 December 1964; professed as a monk at St. Ottilien Archabbey 1985; ordained a priest 1992; elected Archabbot of St. Ottilien Archabbey October 2000; elected Abbot Primate 14 September 2024
