= Ottilien =

Ottilien may refer to:

- Previous name of Ramu, a river in northern Papua New Guinea
- the Ottilien Congregation, a congregation of religious houses within the Benedictine Confederation
- the St. Ottilien Archabbey
