= Rhabanus-Maurus-Gymnasium St. Ottilien =

Rhabanus-Maurus-Gymnasium, St. Ottilien
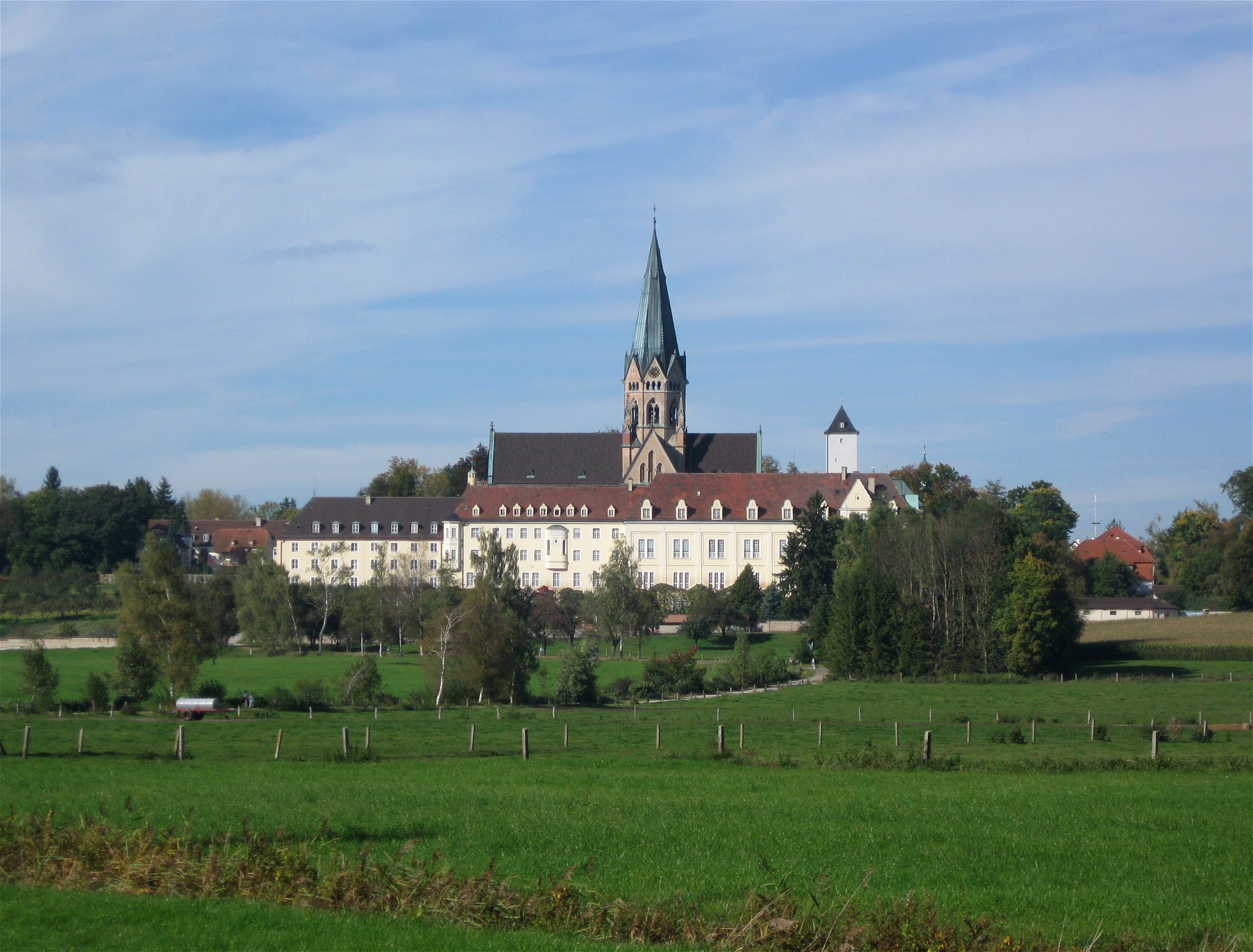
- The Monastery St. Ottilien with adjunct Rhabanus-Maurus-Gymnasium

Location
- Erzabtei 23; St. Ottilien, Eresing, Bavaria, 86941; Germany
- Coordinates: 48°5′49″N 11°2′44″E

Information
- School type: Gymnasium
- Religious affiliation: Roman Catholic (Benedictine)
- Founded: 1886
- Director: Michael Häußinger
- Gender: Coeducational
- Enrolment: ~ 700 (2021)
- Website: gym-ottilien.de

The Rhabanus-Maurus-Gymnasium St. Ottilien is a church-funded, classical school in Eresing, Landsberg (district), Bavaria, Germany. Within the German framework it is considered as a Grammar School for the Humanities - Modern Languages Emphasis (German: Humanistisches Gymnasium mit neuprachlichem Zweig). The school campus is based on the premises of the St. Ottilien Archabbey and finds its roots in traditional Christian values. Currently, the school comprises more than 700 students.

== Teaching and Extracurricular Activities ==
The Rhabanus-Maurus-Gymnasiumis linked to the Order of Saint Benedict and its teaching have been built on the doctrines of St. Benedict, hence the Gymnasium aims to offer a wholistic education focusing on technology, arts and social sciences. The school is considered one of Germany's leading schools in technology, mathematics and classical education. In its 2009 survey, the Bavarian Ministry of Culture and Education counts the school within the top 10% Gymnasia for German, Latin and Mathematics. Besides their work in school, Ottilian students are known for their extra-curricular activities, in particular for its quadri-annual "Circus St. Ottilien", the student-driven emergency services, the IT-projects and its modern art faculties. In recent years, the school's students showed excellent results in Germany's nationwide mathematics competitions (Bundeswettbewerb Mathematik) and performances in Germany's regional, federal and national musical competition (Jugend Musiziert). A former member of the student IT team, Bastian Aigner, was invited to Apple's Worldwide Developers Conference (WWDC). Since its foundation, the Gymnasium counts a variety of politicians, journalists, scientists, authors and the Ninth Abbot Primate of the Benedictian Confederation, Notker Wolf, to its alumni.

== History ==
The school was founded as a young monks' boarding school in 1886/1887, with the target to send young missionaries to the German colonies. In addition to the usual curriculum, students at the time also had to prepare their life as missionaries. Together with the Sankt Ottilien Archabbey the school was closed during World War II, as church-funded schools were not tolerated under the Nazi regime, instead the buildings were used as a military hospital. In the aftermath of the war the school was used as a reception camp for displaced people and refugees. In 1973, the school started to teach girls and extended its strictly classical curriculum to modern languages. Until 1976, the school was funded through the Sankt Ottilien Archabbey, since then it is financed through the Diocese of Augsburg. Traditionally, religious studies form a mandatory part of the curriculum, whereas Roman Catholic and Protestant students are taught separately. Until today a fraction of teachers consists of Benedictian monks.

== Alumni ==
=== Alumni association: Confoederatio Ottiliensis ===
Beyond establishing a network of former Ottilians, the alumni association of Rhabanus-Maurus-Gymnasium aims to support and foster the network of the Gymnasium and future generations of students. Thereby the alumni specifically support the monastery of St. Ottilien, as well as the school. Members of the CO include former students, teachers and staff of the monastery St. Ottilien.

=== Notable alumni ===
- Boniface Sauer, martyred Benedictine priest, bishop, missionary in Korea

== Bibliography ==
- Uwe Sandfuchs: Katholische Missionsschulen in Deutschland (1887–1940). DFG-Projekt. TU Dresden, Dresden 2004-2006 (SOFIS-Recherche Forschungsprojekt der Fakultät Erziehungswissenschaften).
- Maria Hildebrandt: Lebendige Steine. Baugeschichte und Baugeschichten der Erzabtei St. Ottilien. In: Ottilianer Reihe. Band 4. EOS, St. Ottilien 2007, ISBN 978-3-8306-7263-0.
- Gerhard Heller: Succisa virescit. Geschichte des Gymnasiums St. Ottilien. In: Ottilianer Reihe. Band 7. EOS, St. Ottilien 2007, ISBN 978-3-8306-7299-9.}
