= Bernard Kälin =

Swiss Benedictine monk

The Most Reverend Bernard Kälin O.S.B.
- 3rd Abbot Primate of the Benedictine Confederation
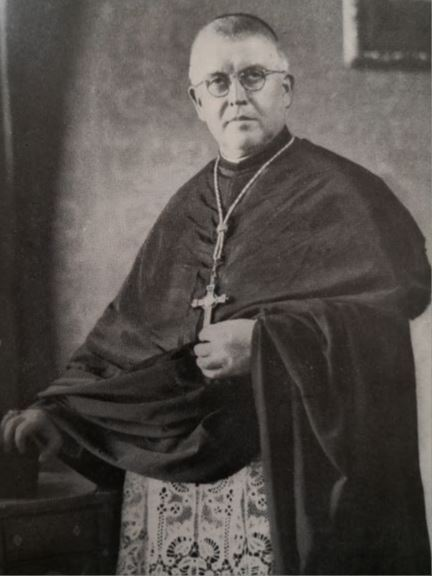
- Elected: 16 September 1947
- Term ended: 20 October 1962
- Predecessor: Fidelis von Stotzingen
- Successor: Benno Gut
- Other post: Abbot of Sant'Anselmo on the Aventine
- Previous posts: Abbot of Muri-Gries Abbey; Rector of Kantonsschule Obwalden; Monk at Muri-Gries Abbey

Orders
- Ordination: 18 October 1912
- Rank: Abbot Primate

Personal details
- Born: Josef Martin Kälin; 21 March 1887 Einsiedeln, Switzerland
- Died: 20 October 1962 (aged 75) Muri-Gries Abbey
- Buried: Muri-Gries Abbey
- Denomination: Roman Catholic
- Parents: Josef Martin Kälin; Anna Verena Schön
- Education: Ph.D. in Philosophy 1918 University of Freiburg

Bernard Kälin (21 March 1887 – 20 October 1962) was a Swiss Benedictine monk and then abbot of Muri-Gries Abbey, and the third Abbot Primate of the Benedictine Confederation.

== Biography ==
Josef Martin Kälin was born in Einsiedeln, Switzerland, on 22 March 1887. His parents were Josef Martin and Anna Verena (née Schön) Kälin. His father was a timber merchant and the family sought to educate all their children. From 1899 to 1907 he attended the high school run by Einsiedeln Abbey. He then entered the monastic life at Muri-Gries Abbey in South Tyrol in 1908 and made his religious profession on 5 October 1909, receiving the monastic name Bernard.

He continued his education in the fields of Philosophy and Theology at the University of Freiburg and was ordained a priest on 18 October 1912. He continued his studies at the same university receiving a doctorate in philosophy in 1918 with a dissertation on the Epistemology of Saint Augustine entitled "Die Erkenntnislehre des hl. Augustinus." Between the years 1913–1945 Kälin taught at Kantonsschule Obwalden overseen by the Benedictines, also serving as rector of the school for some years. He wrote a number of philosophy textbooks that became popular.

On 10 August 1945 Kälin was elected as the Abbot of Muri-Gries Abbey and received his blessing on 13 August 1945. He served in the role for only two years until he was elected as the third Abbot Primate of the Benedictine Confederation on 16 September 1947. As Abbot Primate he resided in Rome, Italy, at the Abbey of Sant'Anselmo all'Aventino. He traveled extensively in his role as Primate, but was also instrumental in his work at the Pontificio Ateneo Sant'Anselmo where he founded a monastic institute, taught philosophy, and redesigned the abbey church. He served in this role until 1959, returning to Muri-Gries Abbey where he died on 20 October 1962.

== Bibliography ==
- Die Erkenntnislehre des hl. Augustinus Sarnen: Ehrli 1921 (OCLC: 401967569).
- Zur Philosophie der Benediktinerregel Sarnen: Ehrli 1929 (OCLC: 79226154).
- Der Pädagoge Paul Häberlin Einsiedeln: Benziger & Co 1930 (OCLC: 77823674).
- Hundert Jahre Kollegium Sarnen 1841–1941. Eine historisch-statistische Skizze Sarnen: Ehrli 1941 (OCLC: 1270689302).
- Lehrbuch der Philosophie Sarnen: Selbstverlag Benediktinerkollegium 1950 (OCLC: 73484915).
- Lehrbuch der Philosophie. Band I: Logik, Ontologie, Kosmologie, Psychologie, Kriteriologie und Theodizee Sarnen: Selbstverlag Benediktinerkollegium 1957 (OCLC: 832441007).
- Lehrbuch der Philosophie. Band II: Einführung in die Ethik Sarnen: Selbstverlag Benediktinerkollegium 1962 (OCLC: 832441031).

== Literature ==
- Martina Roder: Ein Benediktinermönch im Dienste seines Ordens. Bernard Kälins Wirken als Rektor, Abt und Abtprimas, 1941–1962 (Zürich: Chronos 2017, ISBN 978-3-0340-1417-5).
