= Fidelis von Stotzingen =

German Benedictine monk

The Most Reverend Fidelis von Stotzingen O.S.B.
- 2nd Abbot Primate of the Benedictine Confederation
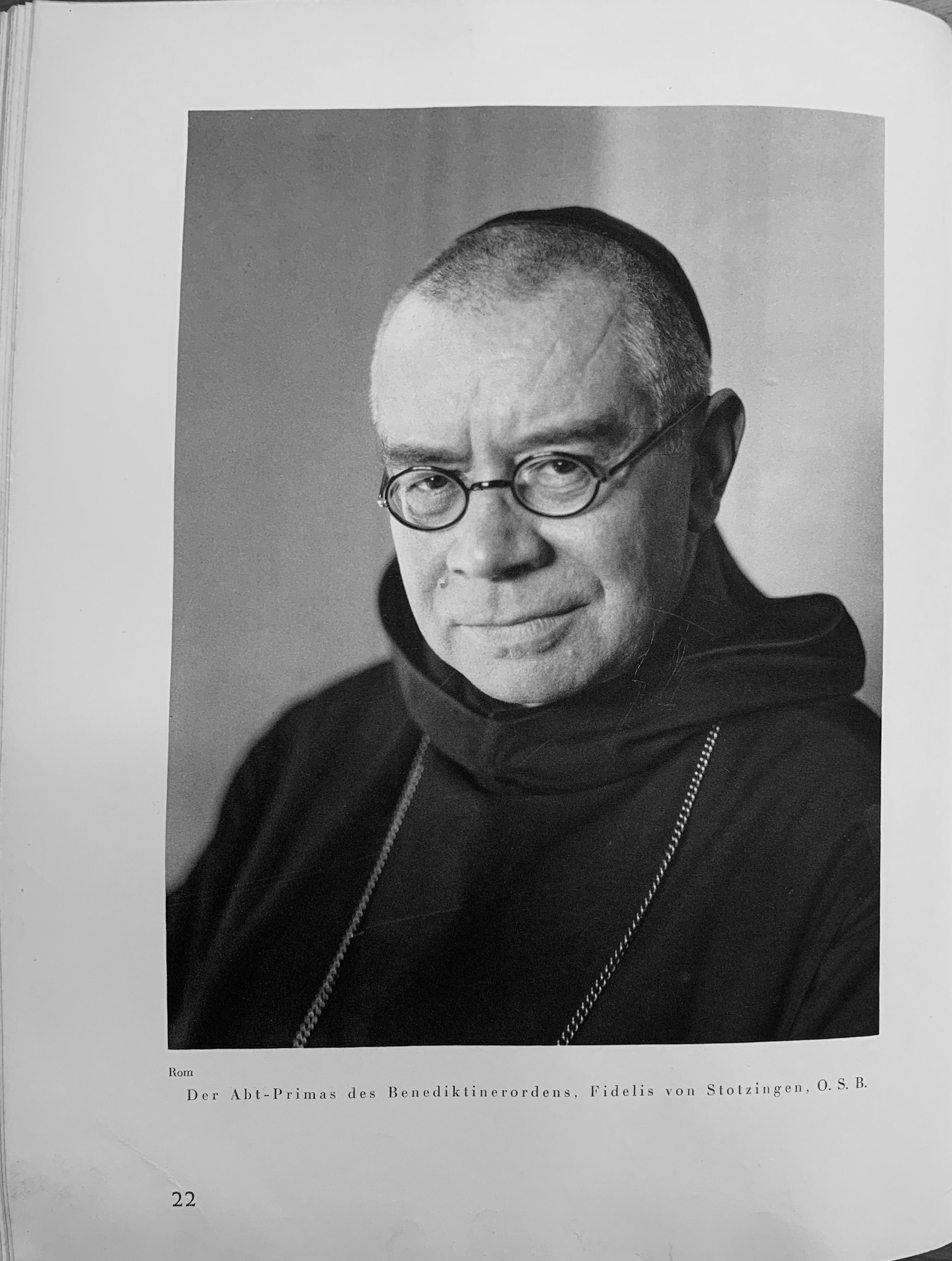
- von Stotzingen in 1930
- Elected: 13 May 1913
- Term ended: 9 January 1947
- Predecessor: Hildebrand de Hemptinne
- Successor: Bernard Kälin
- Other post: 2nd Abbot of Sant'Anselmo all'Aventino
- Previous posts: Coadjutor Abbot Primate of Benedictine Confederation (1913); 2nd Abbot of Maria Laach Abbey (1901–1913); Monk at Beuron Archabbey

Orders
- Ordination: 27 September 1897
- Rank: Abbot Primate

Personal details
- Born: Wilhelm Freiherr von Stotzingen; 1 May 1871 Steisslingen, Baden, Germany
- Died: 9 January 1947 (aged 75) Collegio Sant'Anselmo
- Buried: Collegio Sant'Anselmo vault at the Campo Verano Cemetery in Rome, Italy
- Denomination: Roman Catholic
- Parents: Roderich Freiherr von Stotzingen (father); Karoline Gräfin von Rechberg und Rothenlöwen (mother)
- Education: Dr. Phil in Philosophy & Dr. Theo in Theology 1899 Pontificio Ateneo Sant'Anselmo

Fidelis von Stotzingen (1 May 1871 – 9 January 1947) was a German Benedictine monk from Beuron Archabbey, the second Abbot of Maria Laach Abbey, and the second Abbot Primate of the Benedictine Confederation.

== Biography ==
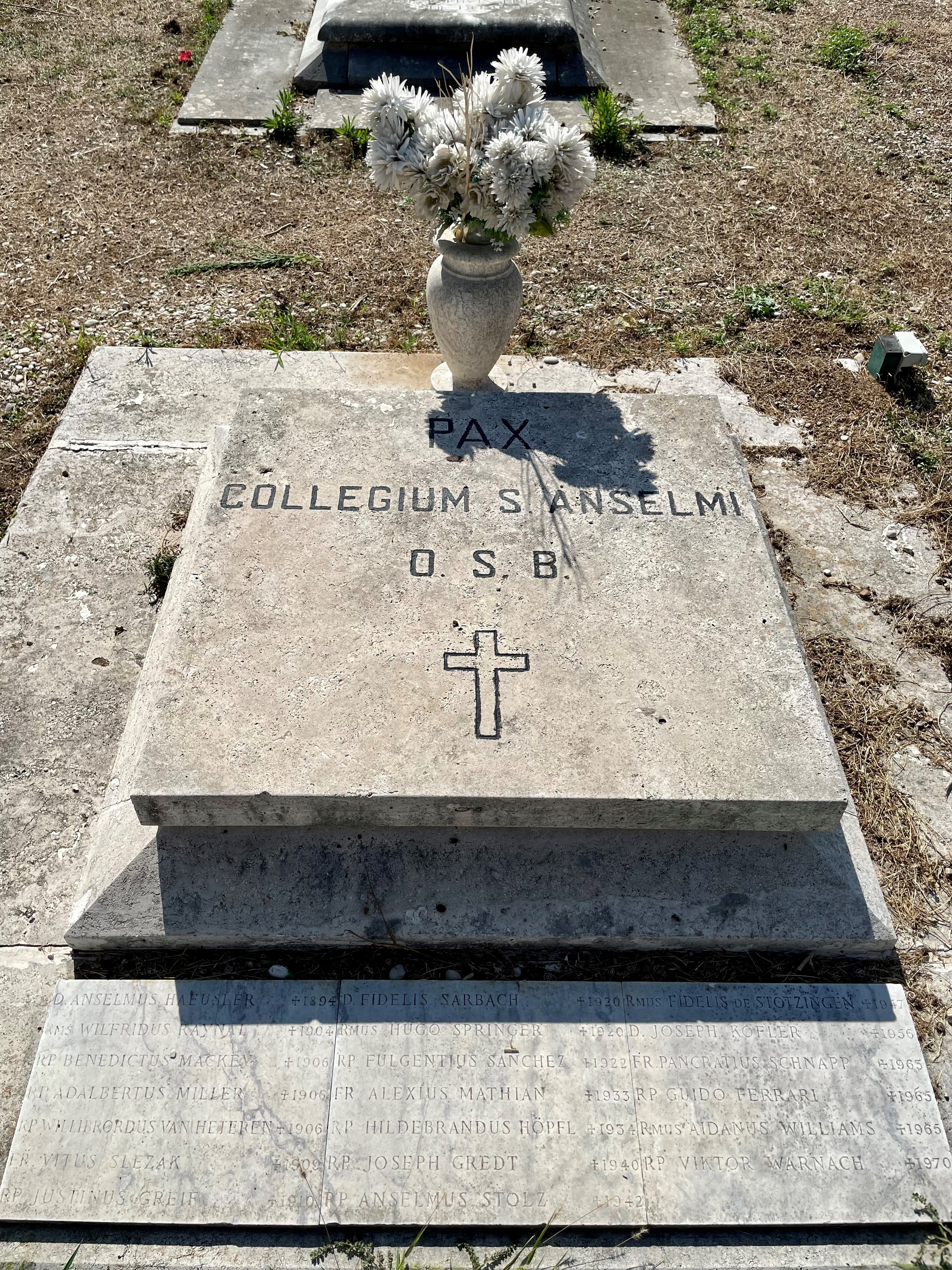
Fidelis von Stotzingen at the Campo Verano Cemetery

Wilhelm Freiherr von Stotzingen was born in Steisslingen, Baden, Germany, on 1 May 1871. His parents were Roderich Freiherr von Stotzingen and Karoline Gräfin von Rechberg und Rothenlöwen and he was one of seven children (four sons and three daughters) of an ancient Swabian noble house. He completed high school in Würzburg and at the age of nineteen he entered Beuron Archabbey and made his religious profession as a monk on 25 January 1892 receiving the name Fidelis. Initial studies at the Pontificio Ateneo Sant'Anselmo in Rome, Italy, led to his ordination to the Roman Catholic priesthood on 27 September 1897. He would continue his studies at the same institution receiving in 1899 a Dr. Phil in Philosophy & Dr. Theo in Theology.

He then returned to Beuron Archabbey where he would serve as the Master of Clerics and a Professor of Dogmatic Theology. On 31 October 1901, he would be elected as the second Abbot of Maria Laach Abbey where he would focus on sending monks to universities for systematic education. He aimed at fuller education for all his spiritual sons and fostered lively scholarly activity and interchange of ideas in his community.

On 13 May 1913, Stotzingen would be elected as Coadjutor Abbot Primate to the ailing Abbot Primate Hildebrand de Hemptinne. At the death of de Hemptinne on 13 August 1913, Stotzingen would become the second Abbot Primate of the Benedictine Confederation. As Abbot Primate he resided in Rome, Italy, while also overseeing Sant'Anselmo all'Aventino and promoting the Pontificio Ateneo Sant'Anselmo to the monasteries of the world. Unfortunately, World War I proved problematic, would require Stotzingen to close Sant’Anselmo temporarily on 15 May 1915, and then move to Einsiedeln Abbey in Switzerland where he tried to continue his work as Abbot Primate. This work also involved extensive travel to countries like the US where he would spend ten months visiting abbeys and parishes. In 1919 he would return to Sant’Anselmo and begin the work of restoring the institution.

Stotzingen would be reelected in 1925 for another twelve-year term of office, would oversee Sant’Anselmo through the early years of World War II, and would spend considerable time dealing with the ongoing challenges of the Benedictine Order. On 9 January 1947, Stotzingen died at Collegio Sant’Anselmo from the complications of multiple strokes and was buried in the Collegio Sant'Anselmo vault at the Campo Verano Cemetery in Rome, Italy.

== See also ==
- Aus dem Leben des Abt-Primas Fidelis Freiherr von Stotzingen O.S.B by Gertrude von Stotzingen in Hegau: Zeitschrift für Geschichte, Volkskunde und Naturgeschichte des Gebietes zwischen Rhein, Donau und Bodensee 8 (1959) p. 232-237
- Fidelis von Stotzingen: Abt von Maria Laach (1901–1913) und Abtprimas der Benediktinischen Konföderation by Stephan Haering in Laacher Lesebuch St. Ottilien (2006) p. 240–246
- Fidelis von Stotzingen by G. Bartsch in Benediktinische Monatsschrift 23 (1947) p. 18-20
- Fidelis von Stotzingen by B. Neunheuser in Liturgie u. Mönchtum 2 (1948) p 57–63

Catholic Church titles
Preceded by Willibrord Benzler	2nd Abbot of the Maria Laach Abbey; 31 October 1901 – 13 May 1913	Succeeded by Ildefons Herwegen
Preceded by Hildebrand de Hemptinne	2nd Abbot Primate of the Benedictine Confederation; 13 May 1913 – 9 January 1947 with Hildebrand de Hemptinne (13 May 1913 – 13 August 1913)	Succeeded by Bernard Kälin
