= Jeremias Schröder =

Abbot Primate of the Benedictine Confederation (born 1964)

The Right Reverend Abbot Jeremias Schröder OSB

Orders
- Ordination: 1992

Personal details
- Born: Maximilian Schröder; 8 December 1964 (age 61) Bad Wörishofen, West Germany
- Denomination: Catholic (Roman Rite)
- Profession: Abbot Primate of the Benedictine Confederation
- Motto: respice stellam
- Coat of arms

Ordination history of Jeremias Schröder
History
Priestly ordination
- Date: 1992

Jeremias Schröder OSB (born Maximilian Schröder; 8 December 1964) is a German Benedictine monk who has served as Abbot Primate of the Benedictine Confederation since 2024.

== Biography ==
Schröder was born on 8 December 1964 in Bad Wörishofen. His father was merchant and his mother chemist. He grew up in Bad Wörishofen and Dorschhausen. He graduated from the local gymnasium school in 1984, having had a focus on modern languages.

Thereafter, Schröder joined St. Ottilien Archabbey. After the novitiate he took his vows to join the order in 1985. From 1985 to 1990 he studied philosophy and theology in Rome and from 1990 to 1994 history in Oxford. In 1992, Schröder was ordained to the priesthood. Beginning that year, he was also spiritual assistant to the Benedictine sisters of Stanbrook.

From 1994 to 2000, Schröder was secretary to archabbot Notker Wolf, as well as zelator, keeper of the archives and editor of the magazine Missionsblätter and of the yearbook of St. Ottilien (Jahrbuch St. Ottilien). He was also engaged in the involvements of his order in China.

In October 2000, Schröder was elected as archabbot of the St. Ottilien Archabbey. As archabbot he was also the leader of the Benedictine Congregation of Saint Ottilien. In 2012 the personal union of the two positions was split and he resigned from the leadership of the abbey but remained praeses of the Ottilien Congregation.

=== Synod of Bishops ===
Schröder was selected to take part at the Fourteenth Ordinary General Assembly of the Synod of Bishops in 2015 as one of the elected representatives of the International Union of Superiors General. He reported that the Catholic fraternal orders considered before the synod to give half of their ten seats to the female orders that are not eligible to vote. However, the IUSG concluded that it would be not enough for the female orders to get seats of the fraternal orders, so they should instead get their own seats.

=== Abbot Primate ===
In 2024, Schröder was elected as Abbot Primate of the Benedictine Confederation at Sant'Anselmo Abbey in Rome.

Leaders of the Missionary Benedictines
Preceded by Notker Wolf	Archabbot of St. Ottilien Archabbey; 2000-2012	Succeeded by Wolfgang Öxler
Preceded by Notker Wolf	Archabbot President of the Congregation of Sant'Ottilia; 2000–2024	Succeeded by N/A
