= Jerome Theisen =

American Benedictine monk

The Most Reverend Jerome Theisen O.S.B.
- 7th Abbot Primate of the Benedictine Confederation
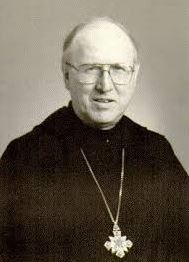
- Elected: 19 September 1992
- Term ended: 11 September 1995
- Predecessor: Viktor Josef Dammertz
- Successor: Marcel Rooney
- Other post: Abbot of Sant'Anselmo all'Aventino
- Previous posts: Abbot of Saint John's Abbey, Collegeville; Monk at Saint John's Abbey, Collegeville

Orders
- Ordination: 28 July 1957
- Rank: Abbot Primate

Personal details
- Born: 30 December 1930 Loyal, Wisconsin, United States
- Died: 11 September 1995 (aged 64) Saint John's Abbey, Collegeville, United States
- Buried: Saint John's Abbey, Collegeville, United States
- Denomination: Roman Catholic
- Parents: William Theisen (father); Mae Reif (mother)
- Education: S.T.D. 1966 Pontificio Ateneo Sant'Anselmo

Jerome Theisen, OSB (30 December 1930 – 11 September 1995) was an American Benedictine monk who served as the eighth abbot of Saint John's Abbey, Collegeville, and the seventh Abbot Primate of the Benedictine Confederation.

== Biography ==
Jerome Theisen was born in Loyal, Wisconsin, United States, on 30 December 1930, the ninth of ten children (five boys and five girls). His parents were William and Mae (née Reif) Theisen. He came to Saint John's to initially study Latin in preparation for seminary, but was drawn to the monastic life and entered the abbey making his religious profession on 11 July 1952. He completed his undergraduate degree in Philosophy and was ordained as a Roman Catholic priest on 28 July 1957. He completed his doctoral studies in Rome at the Pontificio Ateneo Sant'Anselmo in 1966 with his dissertation entitled "Mass Liturgy and the Council of Trent." Theisen returned to America and began an extensive scholarly life writing books and articles, along with giving retreats, workshops, lectures, and serving as a professor at numerous academic institutions. As noted in his obituary:

Father Jerome served as chaplain of the College and Convent of Saint Benedict, St. Joseph, MN; as associate director of the Institute for Ecumenical and Cultural Research; as an official Vatican visitator of seminaries; as a member of the Formation Committee of the Conference of Major Superiors of Men; and as Novice Master of Saint John's Abbey for a three-year term.

On 22 August 1979 Theisen was elected as the eighth abbot of Saint John's Abbey receiving his abbatial blessing on 19 October 1979. He served in the role for the next thirteen years until he was elected as the seventh Abbot Primate of the Benedictine Confederation and Order of St. Benedict on 19 September 1992. As Abbot Primate he resided in Rome, Italy, overseeing Sant'Anselmo all'Aventino.

During his abbatial years at Saint John's and later as Abbot Primate for a short three years before his death, he travelled quite extensively to represent the Benedictine community. As his home abbey of Saint John's had to address the growing realization of prior sexual abuse by monks of their monastery, Theisen would establish in 1991 the "Interfaith Sexual Trauma Institute." As Abbot Primate he would be remembered especially for his role in convoking in Rome an international gathering of women monastics in September 1992. After only three years into his six-year term as Abbot Primate, Theisen died of a heart attack on 11 September 1995 and is buried at Saint John's Abbey in Collegeville, Minnesota.

Catholic Church titles
Preceded by John Eidenschink	Abbot of the Saint John's Abbey, Collegeville; 22 August 1979 – 19 September 1992	Succeeded by Timothy Kelly
Preceded by Viktor Josef Dammertz	Abbot Primate of the Benedictine Confederation; 19 September 1992 – 11 September 1995	Succeeded by Viktor Josef Dammertz
