= Wolfgang Öxler =

German Benedictine and archabbot

Orders
- Ordination: 1988

Personal details
- Born: Erwin Öxler; 1 May 1957 (age 69)
- Denomination: Catholic (Roman Rite)
- Profession: archabbot of the St. Ottilien Archabbey

Ordination history of Wolfgang Öxler
History
Priestly ordination
- Date: 1988

Wolfgang Öxler OSB (born 1 May 1957 in Dillingen an der Donau as Erwin Öxler) is a German Benedictine and archabbot of the St. Ottilien Archabbey.

Wolfgang Öxler studied at the professional academy for social pedagogy in Dillingen. In 1979, he joined the St. Ottilien Archabbey. He had his profession in 1983. From 1981 to 1987 he studied theology at LMU Munich. In 1988, he was ordained to the priesthood. In 2012, he was elected as archabbot of the St. Ottilien Archabbey.

Leaders of the Missionary Benedictines
Preceded by Jeremias Schröder	Archabbot of St. Ottilien Archabbey; 2012-	Succeeded by
