= Notker Wolf =

German Benedictine monk (1940–2024)

The Right Reverend Notker Wolf, O.S.B.
- Abbot Primate emeritus
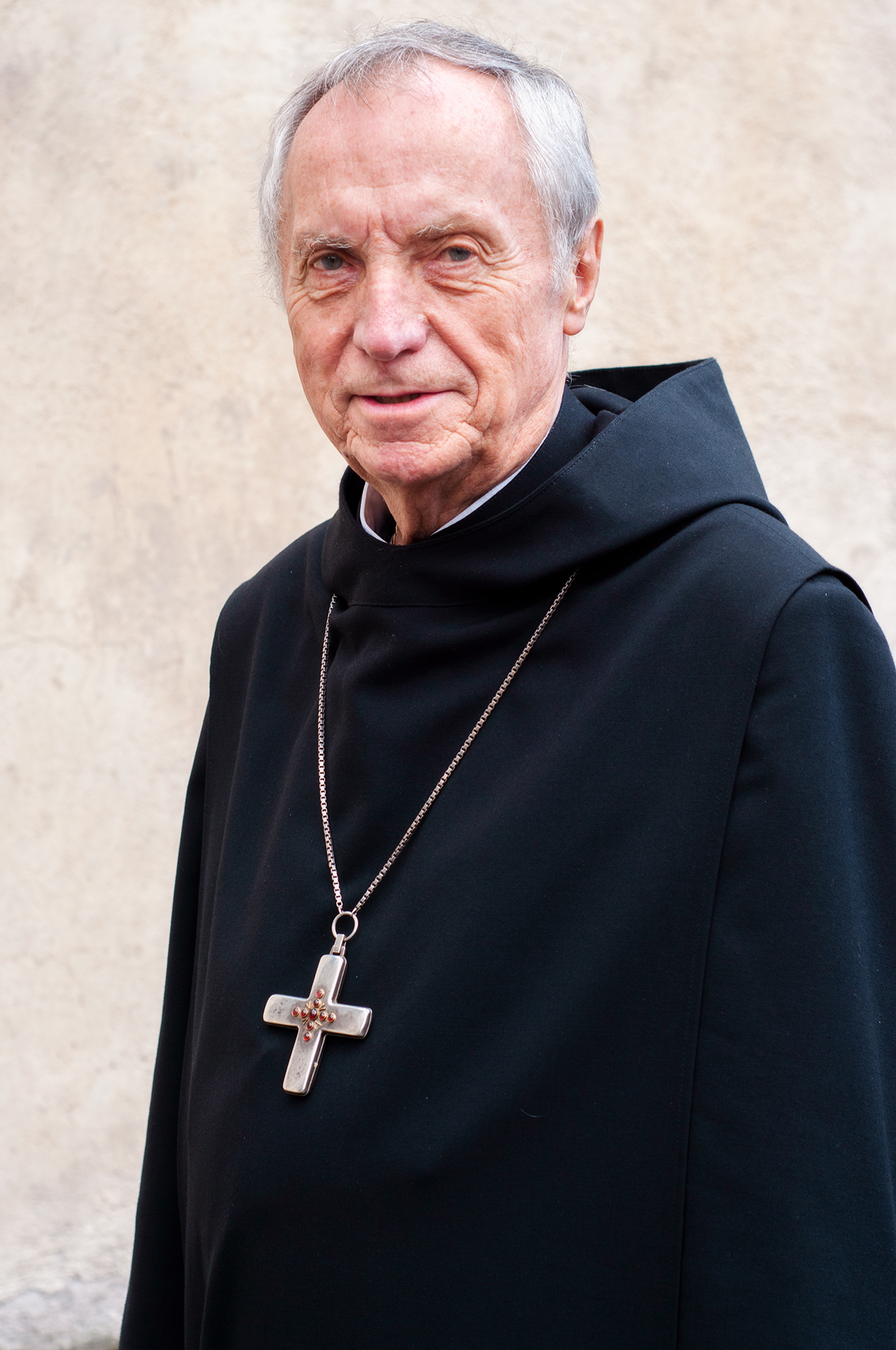
- Wolf in 2016
- Previous posts: 9th Abbot Primate of the Order of St. Benedict; Archabbot of St. Ottilien Archabbey; Abbot President of the St. Ottilien Congregation; Professor at the Pontifical Atheneum of Sant'Anselmo

Orders
- Ordination: 1 September 1968 St. Ottilien Archabbey
- Rank: Abbot Primate emeritus

Personal details
- Born: Werner Wolf; 21 June 1940 Bad Grönenbach, Gau Swabia, German Reich
- Died: 2 April 2024 (aged 83)
- Denomination: Catholic
- Residence: St. Ottilien Archabbey
- Education: Pontificio Ateneo Sant'Anselmo; LMU Munich

Notker Wolf OSB (German pronunciation: [ˈnoːtkɐ ˈvɔlf]; 21 June 1940 – 2 April 2024) was a German Benedictine monk, priest, abbot, musician, and author. He was a member of St. Ottilien Archabbey located in Bavaria, Germany, which is part of the Benedictine Congregation of Saint Ottilien. He served as the ninth Abbot Primate of the Benedictine Confederation of the Order of Saint Benedict from 2000 to 2016. He was known as the "rock abbot", for playing flute and sometimes e-guitar with the rock band Feedback in concerts and recordings.

== Biography ==
=== Early life ===
Werner Wolf was born on 21 June 1940, the son of a tailor in Bad Grönenbach in the Allgäu region of Germany. He undertook his early education at Oberrealschule Memmingen (today Bernhard-Strigel-Gymnasium and at the Rhabanus-Maurus-Gymnasium St. Ottilien) where he graduated in 1961. He then petitioned to enter the Benedictine monastery of St. Ottilien Archabbey.

=== Monastic life ===
Wolf began his profession as a Benedictine monk on 17 September 1962, and was given the name "Notker" in honor of Saint Notker. He then began his philosophical studies in Rome, at the Benedictine Pontificio Ateneo Sant'Anselmo. In 1965, he began studies at LMU Munich where he concentrated in the interdisciplinary fields of theology, philosophy, and natural sciences (zoology, inorganic chemistry, and the history of astronomy). He was ordained a priest on 1 September 1968 at St. Ottilien Archabbey. In 1970, Wolf returned to Rome and was appointed a professor of natural philosophy and philosophy of science at the Pontificio Ateneo Sant'Anselmo. In 1974, he achieved his doctor of philosophy (Dr. Phil.) degree from the same institution with a dissertation entitled "Das zyklische Weltmodell der Stoa. Ein Beitrag zur Geschichte von der Ewigen Wiederkehr des Gleichen" (The cyclical world model of the Stoa: A contribution to the history of the eternal return of the same).

Three years later, on 1 October 1977, Wolf was elected as the fifth Archabbot of St. Ottilien Archabbey, and thus also Abbot President of the Benedictine Congregation of Saint Ottilien with monasteries and foundations scattered throughout the world. At the time the congregation had over twenty monasteries and over 1,100 monks. Monks of this congregation are known as Missionary Monks, and Wolf fulfilled his mandate by building hospitals, schools, colleges, and monasteries, including countries such as China and North Korea.

On 7 September 2000, over 260 of the abbots of the Benedictine Confederation gathered in Rome and elected Wolf as the 9th Abbot Primate of the Order of St. Benedict. Although an "Abbot Primate" possesses little real authority over autonomous monasteries or congregations of monks, this position does allow him to serve as the visible presence of the Benedictine Order to the larger world. The office of Abbot Primate was created by Pope Leo XIII in 1886 to serve the Benedictine community as its liaison to the Vatican and civil authorities, to promote unity among the various autonomous Benedictine monasteries and congregations, and to represent the order at religious gatherings around the globe. The Abbot Primate resides at the primatial abbey of Sant'Anselmo all'Aventino in Rome, as well as serves as the "Grand Chancellor" to the Pontificio Ateneo Sant'Anselmo. With the election of Abbot Gregory Polan as the new Abbot Primate on 9 September 2016, Wolf had completed sixteen years of service to the Benedictine Confederation.

Wolf returned to his home abbey of St. Ottilien and continued his life as a monk. He kept lecturing, including abroad such as in Tanzania and South Africa. His continued passions included inter-religious dialogue, environmental issues, responsible immigration policies, and ethical leadership and management.

Notker had always been skilled in music, which he expressed in Gregorian chant; he played flute and sometimes electric guitar in a rock band known as Feedback in concerts and recordings. He always took his flute along when traveling. Once when Feedback played as opening act for Deep Purple in a concert in Germany, he rocked with Deep Purple on stage. He played guitar with a school band to frame his lecture in 2022.

Wolf died on 2 April 2024, at the age of 83. He had accompanied a group of pilgrims to Rome, but felt ill and returned home sooner than the group. He missed a plane connection in Frankfurt and stayed in a hotel, where he died of a heart attack. His Requiem on 6 April was streamed live by the abbey.

== Publications ==
Wolf published numerous books, articles, interviews, videos, music CDs, and online streaming platform content. His books, musical compositions, and articles have been translated into over twenty different languages. Among his publications are:

=== Books ===
- Freisein für Gott. Einübung in die Geistliche Lesung (with Johanna Domek), Bonifatius-Druckerei, Paderborn 2004 (ISBN 3-89710-280-3)
- Worauf warten wir? Ketzerische Gedanken zu Deutschland (with Leo G. Linder), Rowohlt-Taschenbuch-Verlag, Reinbek bei Hamburg 2006 (ISBN 3-499-62094-4)
- Die Kunst, Menschen zu führen (with Enrica Rosanna & Leo G. Linder), Rowohlt-Taschenbuch-Verlag, Reinbek bei Hamburg 2007 (ISBN 978-3-499-62256-4)
  - The art of leadership (English version), Liturgical Press, Collegeville 2013 (ISBN 978-0-8146-3810-1)
- Die Botschaft Benedikts. Die Weisheit seiner Äbte und Äbtissinnen, Vier Türme, Münsterschwarzach 2008 (ISBN 978-3-89680-350-4)
- Aus heiterem Himmel. Einfälle und Eingebungen für das Leben hier unten, Rowohlt-Taschenbuch-Verlag, Reinbek bei Hamburg 2008 (ISBN 978-3-499-62325-7)
- Im Schatten des großen Drachen. Begegnungen mit Chinas Christen (with Corinna Mühlstedt), Kreuz-Verlag, Stuttgart 2008 (ISBN 978-3-7831-3164-2)
- Regeln zum Leben. Die Zehn Gebote – Provokation und Orientierung für heute (with Matthias Drobinski), Herder, Freiburg im Breisgau 2008 (ISBN 978-3-451-03017-8)
- Wie mit neuen Augen. Weg-Begleiter für Pilger (with Audio-CD), Butzon & Bercker, Kevelaer 2008 (ISBN 978-3-7666-0968-7)
- Gott segne Sie! Neue Einfälle für das Leben hier unten, Rowohlt-Taschenbuch-Verlag, Reinbek bei Hamburg February 2009 (ISBN 978-3-499-62460-5)
- Von den Mönchen lernen, Pattloch, April 2009 (ISBN 978-3-629-02179-3)
- Gönn dir Zeit. Es ist dein Leben, Herder, Freiburg im Breisgau April 2009 (ISBN 978-3-451-30187-2)
  - Make time for yourself: it's your time (English version), D.K. Printworld, New Delhi 2010 (ISBN 978-81-246-0559-2)
- Wohin pilgern wir? Alte Wege und neue Ziele, Rowohlt-Taschenbuch-Verlag, Reinbek bei Hamburg September 2009 (ISBN 978-3-498-07366-4)
- Mitten im Leben wird Gott geboren (with Corinna Mühlstedt), Herder, Freiburg im Breisgau September 2010 (ISBN 978-3-451-32329-4)
- Alles Gute kommt von Oben. Kleine Wahrheiten für zwischendurch, Rowohlt-Taschenbuch-Verlag, Reinbek bei Hamburg November 2010 (ISBN 978-3-499-62702-6)
- Die sieben Säulen des Glücks, Herder, Freiburg im Breisgau January 2011 (ISBN 978-3-451-31707-1)
- Schmetterlinge im Bauch, Herder, Freiburg im Breisgau March 2011 (ISBN 978-3-942208-27-7)
  - Faith can give us wings: the art of letting go (English version), Paraclete Press, Brewster, MA 2013 (ISBN 978-1-61261-497-7)
- Das kleine Buch der wahren Freiheit, Herder, Freiburg im Breisgau September 2011 (ISBN 978-3-451-31070-6)
- Erfüllte Zeit: Ermutigungen für das Leben, St. Benno Verlag December 2011 (ISBN 978-3-7462-3064-1)
- JETZT ist die Zeit für den Wandel. Nachhaltig leben, für eine gute Zukunft (with Alfons Kifmann), Herder, Freiburg im Breisgau April 2012 (ISBN 978-3-451-32454-3)
- Seien Sie unbesorgt! Vorschläge für ein erfülltes Leben, Knaur TB, August 2012 (ISBN 978-3-426-78526-3)
- Jesus: Ein Leben (with Leo G. Linder), Gütersloher Verlagshaus, August 2012 (ISBN 978-3-579-06578-6)
- Die sieben Säulen des Glücks. Tugenden für das Leben, Herder, Freiburg im Breisgau 2012 (ISBN 978-3-451-06399-2)
- Spiritus loci – vom Geist des Ortes. Ein spirituelles Reisebuch (with Alfons Kifmann), Schnell & Steiner, Regensburg 2014 (ISBN 978-3-7954-2905-8)
- Das Böse. Wie unsere Welt aus den Fugen gerät (with Leo G. Linder), Gütersloher Verlagshaus, Gütersloh 2014 (ISBN 978-3-579-08512-8)
  - Evil: how our culture is going off the rails (English version), D.K. Printworld, New Delhi 2016 (ISBN 978-81-246-0872-2)
- Altwerden beginnt im Kopf – Jungbleiben auch (with Leo G. Linder), adeo-Verlag, 2015 (ISBN 978-3-86334-037-7)
  - Aging starts in your mind: you're only as old as you feel (English version), Paraclete Press, Brewster, MA 2017 (ISBN 978-1-61261-814-2)
- Läuft. Pessimisten stehen im Regen. Optimisten duschen unter Wolken, adeo-Verlag, 2016 (ISBN 978-3-86334-116-9)
- Schluss mit der Angst – Deutschland schafft sich nicht ab! (with Simon Biallowons), Herder, Freiburg im Breisgau 2017 (ISBN 978-3-451-37620-7)
- Gute Vorsätze. Beim nächsten Mal wird alles anders (with Alfons Kifmann), Gütersloher Verlagshaus, Gütersloh 2017 (ISBN 978-3-579-08545-6)
- Das Unmögliche denken, das Mögliche wagen. Visionen für eine bessere Zukunft (with Alfons Kifmann), Gütersloher Verlagshaus, Gütersloh 2019 (ISBN 978-3-579-08548-7)
- Leadership in the context of religious institutions: the case of Benedictine Monasteries (with Günter Müller-Stewens) editors, Springer, Cham 2019 (ISBN 978-3-030-13769-4)
- Ich denke an Sie die Kunst, einfach da zu sein (with Simon Biallowons), Herder, Freiburg im Breisgau 2020 (ISBN 978-3-451-38530-8)
- Warum ich an Freiheit und Verantwortung glaube, Leipzig Benno 2020 (ISBN 978-3-7462-5750-1)
- Donne-toi le temps de vivre: conseils d'un moine globe-trotter surbooké abbé-primat émérite de l'ordre bénédictin (with Marie-Noëlle Villedieu de Torcy), Nouan-le-Fuzelier 2020 (ISBN 979-10-306-0321-7)
- Die Sehnsucht nach dem Ursprung ist die Sehnsucht nach einem neuen Anfang (with Hans-Günther Kaufmann), Leipzig Benno 2021 (ISBN 978-3-7462-5913-0)

=== Recordings ===
- with Feedback: Rock My Soul, (Rock-Audio-CD) Point Music, April 2003
- with Inka Stampfl: Weiherserenade. Französische Kammermusik aus drei Jahrhunderten, (Audio-CD) EOS-Verlag, St. Ottilien 2008
- with Carlo Günther: Notker Wolf liest "Wohin pilgern wir?" Alte Wege und neue Ziele, (Audio-CD) audio book, Hamburg, Hamburg 2010
- Notker Wolf plays Bach, (Audio-CD) Herder, Freiburg im Breisgau June 2011
- with Feedback: No Lies, (Rock-Audio-CD) Transformer (Membran), April 2012

== Gallery ==
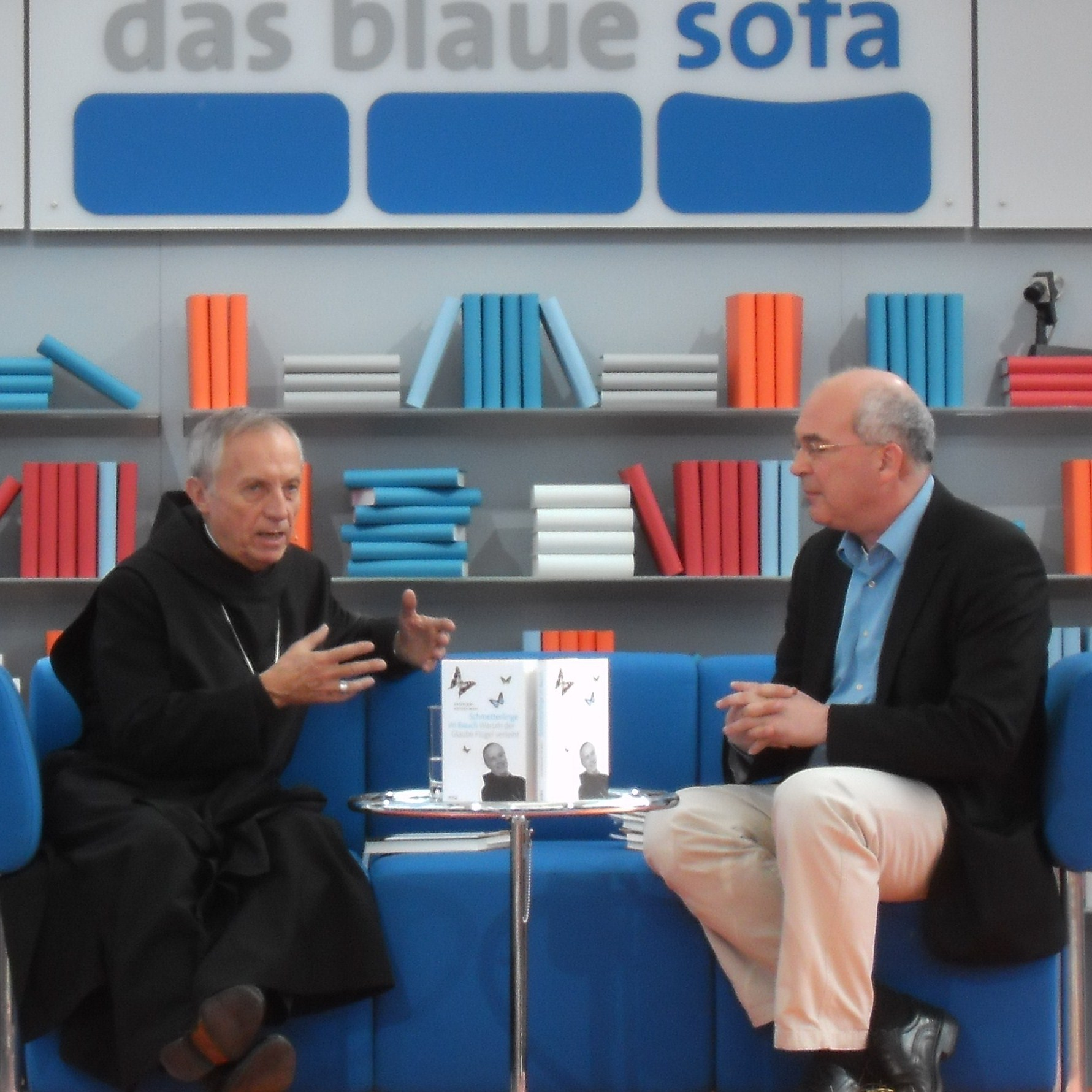
Wolf (l.) at the Leipzig Book Fair, 2011

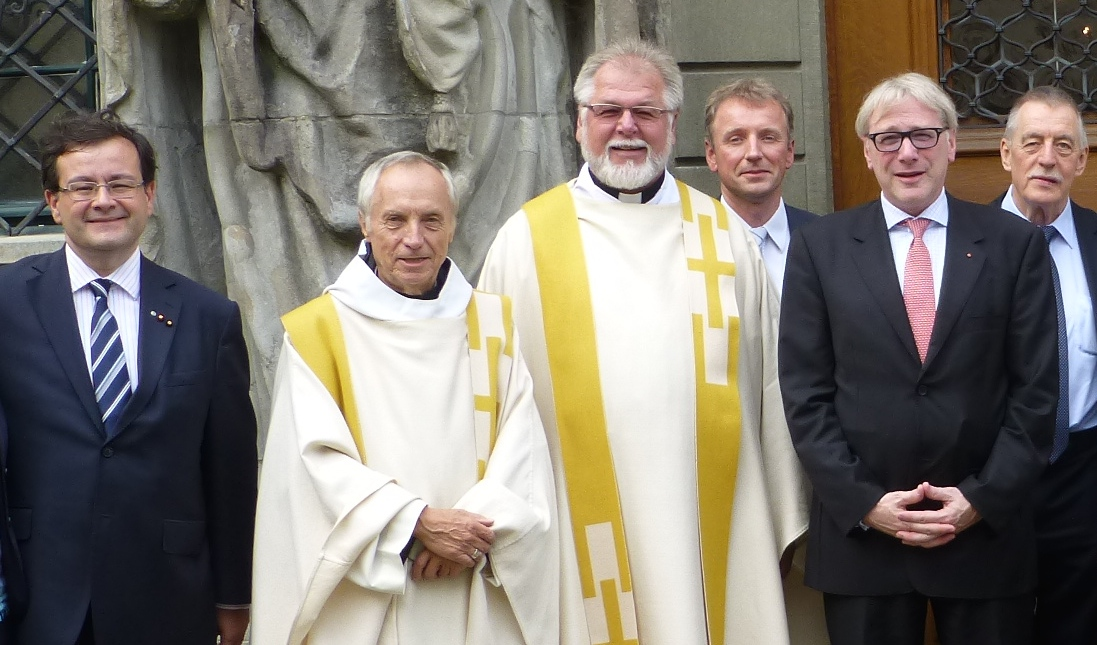
Wolf (2nd l.) at a meeting of the Anima Fraternity,
2014

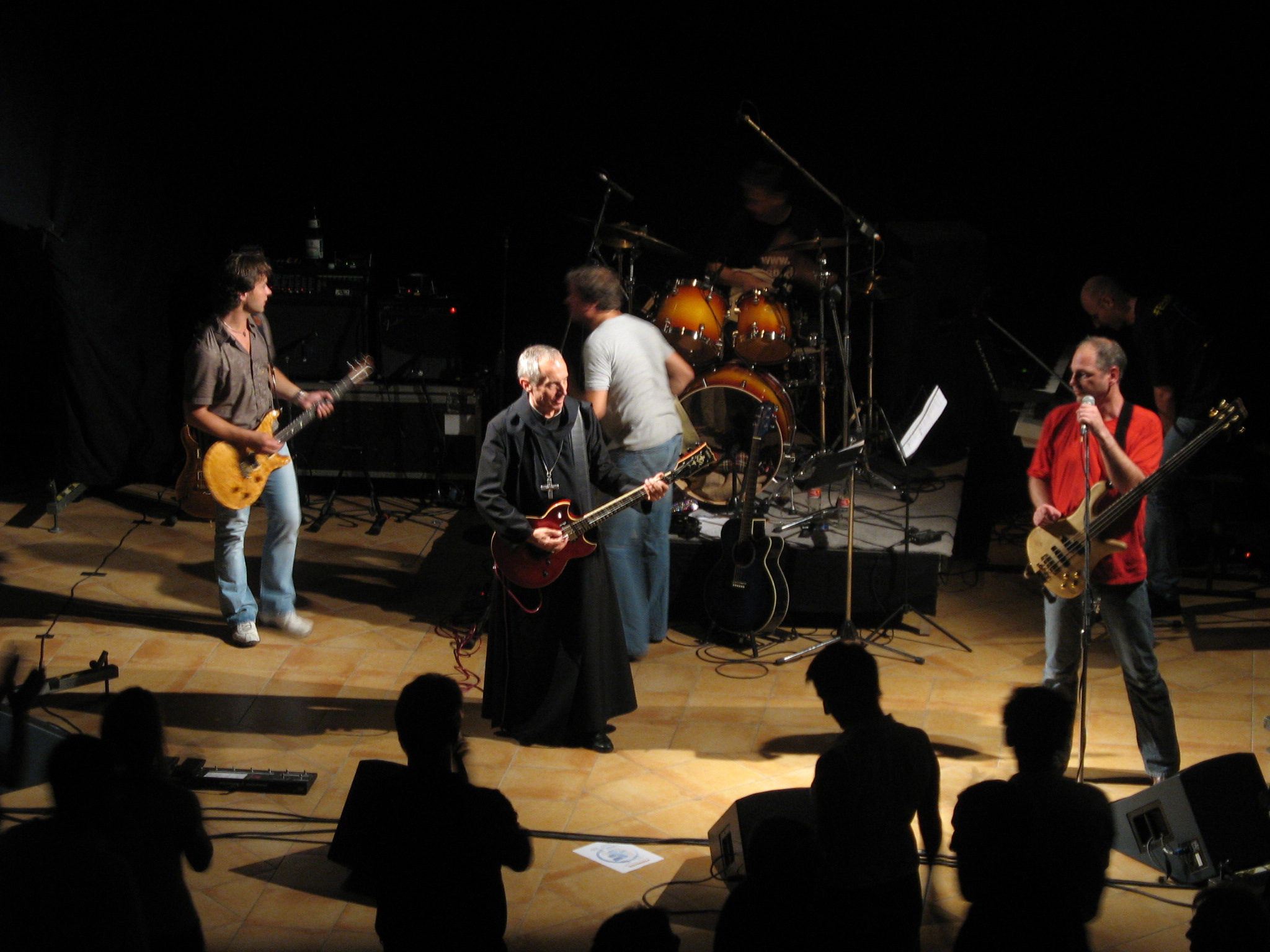
In concert with Feedback,
2007

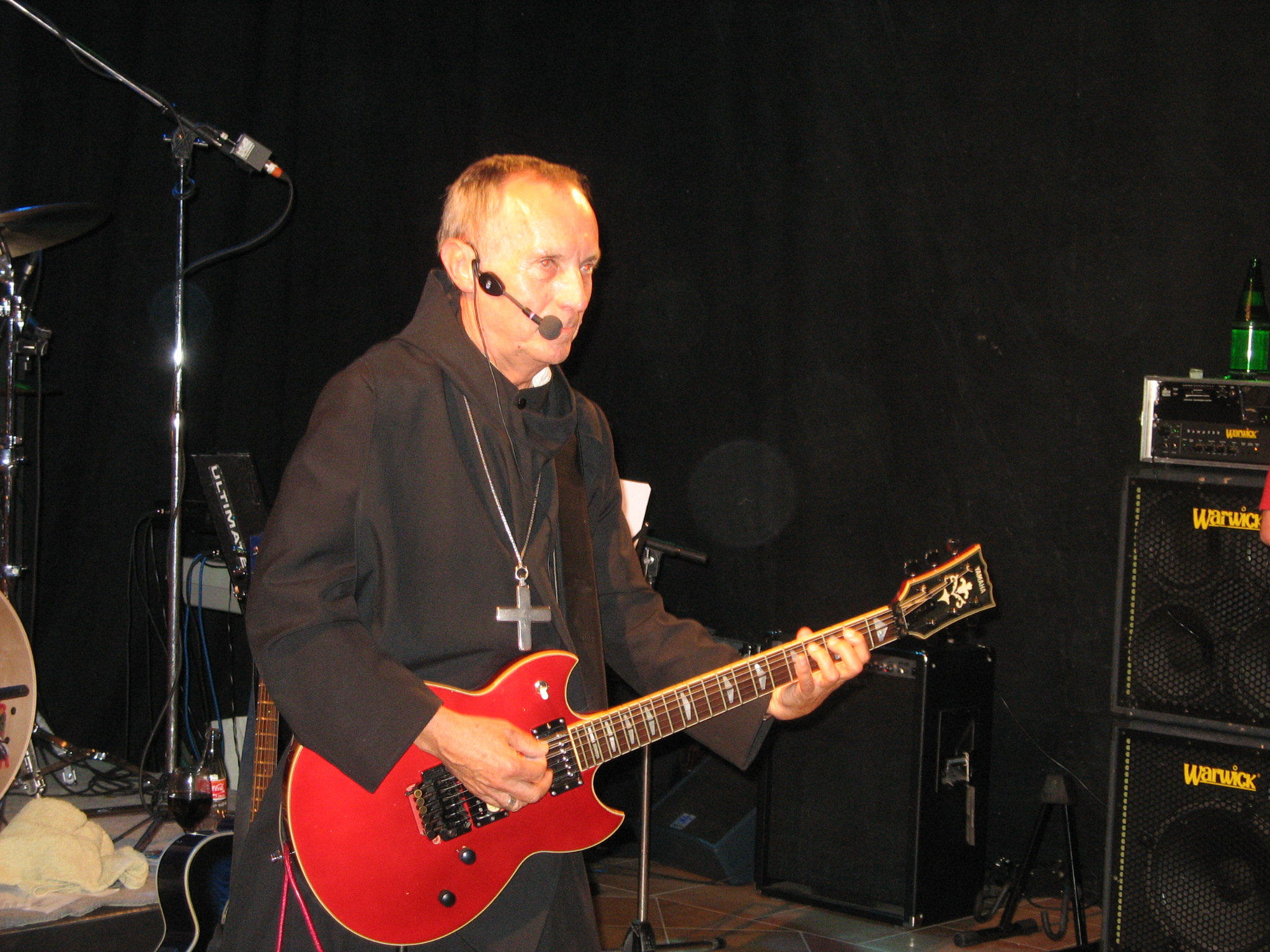
As guitarist in concert,
2007

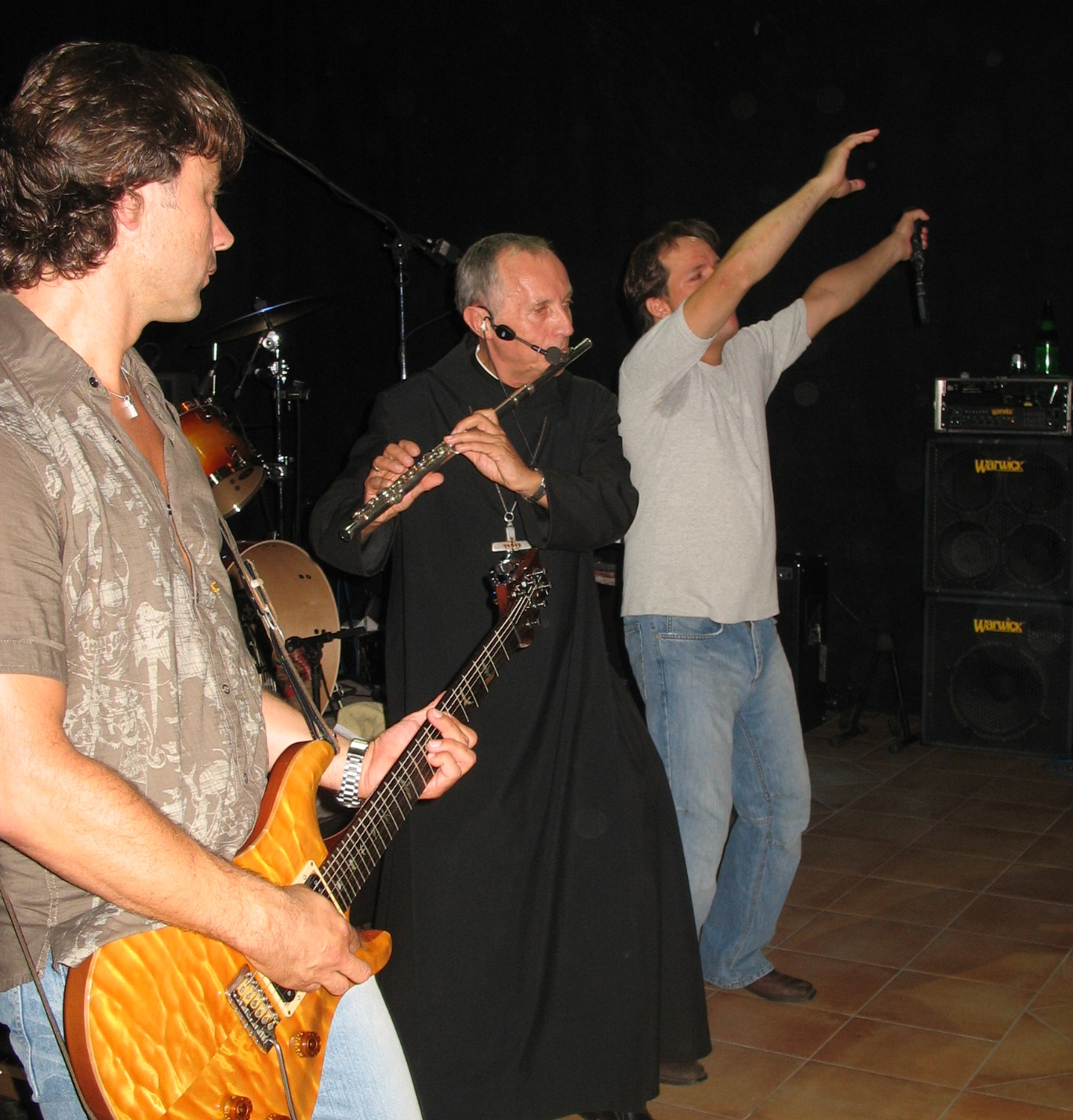
As flutist in concert with Feedback,
2011

Leaders of the Missionary Benedictines
Preceded by Viktor Josef Dammertz	Archabbot of St. Ottilien Archabbey; 1977–2000	Succeeded by Jeremias Schröder
Preceded by Viktor Josef Dammertz	Abbot President of the Benedictine Congregation of Saint Ottilien; 1977–2000	Succeeded by Jeremias Schröder
