= Enrica Rosanna =

Italian Roman Catholic nun (born 1938)

Sister Enrica Rosanna F.M.A.

Personal life
- Born: July 3, 1938 (age 87) Busto Arsizio, Italy

Religious life
- Religion: Roman Catholic
- Order: Daughters of Mary Help of Christians (Salesian Sisters of St. Don Bosco)

Enrica Rosanna F.M.A. (born 1938) is an Italian nun of the Daughters of Mary Help of Christians (Salesian Sisters of St. Don Bosco), and a sociologist and author. She is the first woman and first nun in Catholic church history to hold a senior post in the Vatican. She retired in 2011.

== Early life and education ==
She was born in 1938 in Busto Arsizio, Lombardy, Italy, in the province of Varese and archdiocese of Milan. She took first vows in the Salesian Sisters of St. Don Bosco in 1964. In 1966 she received a degree in religious science in Turin at the l’Istituto Internazionale di Pedagogia e Scienze Religiose di Torino. In 1970 she received a doctorate in sociology from the Pontifical Gregorian University, the Jesuits' university in Rome.

== Career ==
She became a professor of sociology and religion at the Pontifical Faculty of Education ("Auxilium") in Rome, run by the Salesian sisters, which is also the only pontifical institution dedicated to women's education. She was president of the Auxilium from 1980 to 1998, and she is now professor emerita. From 1970 to 1972 she was a guest lecturer at her undergraduate university in Turin. From 1973 on she became a visiting, associate, and full professor at three universities in Rome conducting research on religion in the service of pastoral care, including (besides the Auxilium), the Salesian Pontifical University, and the Pontifical Lateran University.

In 1996 she became a member of the so-called "commission of sages" set up by Luigi Berlinguer, then Italy's minister of public education. She was named an expert participant in three Rome synods in 1994 (synod for consecrated life), 1999 (synod for Europe), and 2001 (synod for bishops), and she came to know Pope John Paul II well because of this. She formally received John Paul II when he conducted a papal visit of the Auxilium in 2000. Before her appointment to high Vatican office, she served as rector of the papal faculty of education. On April 24, 2024, John Paul II appointed her as undersecretary of the Dicastery for Institutes of Consecrated Life and Societies of Apostolic Life (CICLSAL).

== Publications ==
With Abbot Primate Notker Wolf, OSB she co-authored The Art of Leadership, a book its authors describe as focusing on "common mistakes that most people make and explain what it truly takes to become an effective leader in business, politics, school, and family life." Originally published in Italian, it was translated into English, Spanish, German, Portuguese, and Polish. She is also a well-published scholar of both articles and book chapters in her field of sociology.
