= Benedictine Confederation =

International governing body of the Benedictine order

Benedictine Confederation of the Order of Saint Benedict
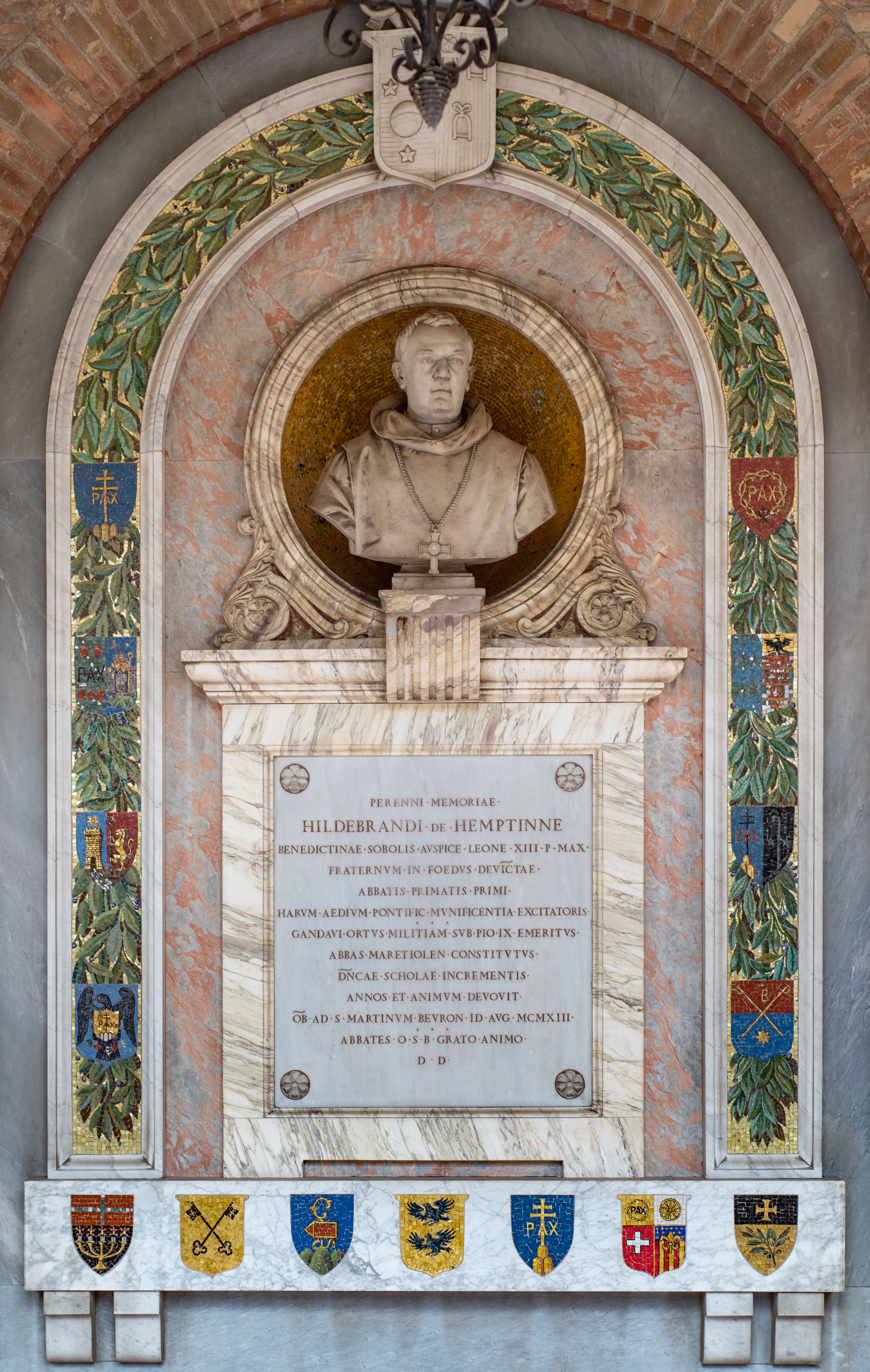
- Bust and monument of Hildebrande de Hemptinne
- Abbreviation: Post-nominal letters: O.S.B.
- Nickname: Benedictines
- Formation: 12 January 1893; 133 years ago
- Founders: Pope Leo XIII
- Founded at: Rome, Italy
- Headquarters: Sant'Anselmo all'Aventino, Rome, Italy
- Region served: Worldwide
- Members: 6,636 as of 2019
- Abbot Primate: Abbot Jeremias Schröder, O.S.B.
- Affiliations: Catholic Church
- Website: Official website

The Benedictine Confederation of the Order of Saint Benedict (Latin: Confœderatio Benedictina Ordinis Sancti Benedicti) is the international governing body of the Order of Saint Benedict.

== Origin ==
The Benedictine Confederation is a union of monastic congregations that nevertheless retain their own autonomy, established by Pope Leo XIII in his brief Summum semper (12 July 1893), subsequently approved by his successors. Pope Pius XII explicitly ordered this union to be regulated by a "Lex Propria", which was later revised after the Second Vatican Council.

== Organization of the Benedictine Confederation ==
Most Benedictine communities are loosely affiliated within 19 national or supra-national congregations. Each of these congregations elects its own abbot president. These presidents meet annually in the Synod of Presidents. Additionally, there is a meeting every four years of the Congress of Abbots, which is made up of all abbots and conventual priors, both of monasteries that are members of congregations, as well as of those unaffiliated with any particular congregation. The Congress of Abbots elects the Abbot Primate, who serves a four-year term as the Confederation's representative and administrative head, although without direct jurisdiction over the individual Congregations.

The Confederation has its headquarters at Sant'Anselmo, which is the seat of the Abbot Primate and hosts the quadrennial Congress of Abbots. Sant'Anselmo is also home to the Benedictine Pontifical Athenaeum, the Collegio Sant'Anselmo, and the "Church of Sant'Anselmo".

Communities of Benedictine nuns and Religious Sisters are joined in 61 congregations and federations that are associated with the Confederation, although they do not have full membership. In November 2001 after a consultation process with all monasteries of Benedictine women around the world, it was decided to use the name Communio Internationalis Benedictinarum (CIB) to designate all communities of Benedictine women recognized by the Abbot Primate as such and listed in the Catalogus Monasteriorum O.S.B.

The first attempt to group Benedictine monasteries into national Congregations was at the Fourth Lateran Council in 1215. Only the English Benedictine Congregation survives from this early attempt at centralization, and in historical reality even this Congregation is a 17th-century foundation although it was given juridical continuity with the medieval English Congregation by Pope Urban VIII's papal bull Plantata of 1633. Primacy of honor is given to the Subiaco Cassinese Congregation, since this Congregation includes the Abbey of Monte Cassino, where St Benedict wrote his Rule and was buried (although Fleury Abbey also claims to house the remains of the founder). Founded in 1872, the Congregation has its origin in the Congregation of the Abbey of Santa Giustina, founded in Padua in 1408 by Dom Ludovico Barbo.

The Benedictines suffered badly in the anti-clerical atmosphere at the time of Napoleon and the modern Congregations were mostly founded in the 19th century when monasticism was revived. The majority are essentially national groupings, although the Subiaco Congregation (originally the Cassinese Congregation of the Primitive Observance) has from the first been truly international because of its interest in foreign missions.

Since the time of the Reformation, there have been independent Benedictine communities in the Protestant (especially Anglican) traditions which maintain official friendly relations with the Benedictine Confederation, although they are not formally linked with it or its congregations.

Throughout the Benedictine confederation and its subdivisions, independence and autonomy among communities are uniquely valued; too highly for Pope Pius XI, who complained that the largely nominal confederation was "an order without order". The basic unit has always been the individual abbey, rather than the Congregation. This explains why some houses (e.g. Monte Cassino, Subiaco, Saint Paul-outside-the-Walls (Rome), Montserrat and Pannonhalma) have unbroken histories of more than a thousand years while the Congregations to which they belong are more recent.

This balance between autonomy and belonging is one of the distinguishing features of the Benedictine Confederation, and brings with it both strengths and weaknesses. One immediate consequence is that there is often great diversity of observance even between houses of the same Congregation: in liturgy, timetable, pastoral involvement and habit.

== Congregations of Benedictine monks ==
The present Confederation of Congregations of Monasteries of the Order of Saint Benedict, officially, the "Benedictine Confederation" of monks, consists of the following congregations in the order given in the Catalogus Monasteriorum OSB (dates are those of the foundation of the congregations – Primacy of honour is given to the Cassinese Congregation, though the English Congregation is the oldest, because Monte Cassino was the original Abbey of St. Benedict himself. The older Camaldolese and Sylvestrine congregations joined the Confederation only in the mid-20th century). The number of houses, monks, and priests is found in the 2019 edition of the Annuario Pontificio.

Name of congregation	Founded	Houses	Monks & Nuns	Priests
Subiaco Cassinese Congregation	1872 (Note: This congregation was founded as the Subiaco Congregation, an offshoot of the Cassinese Congregation, founded in 1408. Although not the oldest, the Cassinese congregation had been given the place of honor in the Confederation due to its inclusion of the Abbey of Monte Cassino, birthplace of the Benedictine Order. In 2013, the Cassinese were incorporated into their daughter congregation. The expanded congregation then took its present name)	64	1245	488
English Congregation	1216	19	268	198
Hungarian Congregation	1514	9	85	64
Swiss Congregation	1602	7	167	121
Austrian Congregation	1625	14	279	215
Bavarian Congregation	1684	13	170	110
Brazilian Congregation	1827	7	184	78
Solesmes Congregation	1837	24	600	339
American-Cassinese Congregation	1855	25	696	412
Beuronese Congregation	1873	9	180	102
Swiss-American Congregation	1881	18	505	256
Ottilien Congregation	1884	53	1107	338
Annunciation Congregation	1920	25	520	283
Slav Congregation	1945	1	13	7
Olivetan Congregation	1319	20	234	119
Vallombrosian Congregation	1036	9	73	48
Camaldolese Congregation	980	12	88	49
Sylvestrine Congregation	1231	22	199	143
Cono-Sur Congregation	1976	8	50	44
Houses outside a congregation		7	158	77
Total		352	6636	3414

== List of the Abbots Primates of the Benedictine Confederation ==
- 1893–1913: Hildebrand de Hemptinne
- 1913–1947: Fidelis von Stotzingen
- 1947–1959: Bernard Kälin
- 1959–1967: Benno Gut
- 1967–1977: Rembert Weakland
- 1977–1992: Viktor Josef Dammertz
- 1992–1995: Jerome Theisen
- 1996–2000: Marcel Rooney
- 2000–2016: Notker Wolf
- 2016–2024: Gregory Polan
- 2024–present: Jeremias Schröder

== Sant'Anselmo ==
Sant'Anselmo on the Aventine (Italian: Sant'Anselmo all'Aventino) is complex located on the Aventine Hill in Rome's Ripa rione and overseen by the Confederation. The complex comprises the "College of Sant'Anselmo" (Italian: Collegio Sant'Anselmo), the "Pontifical Athenaeum of Saint Anselm" (Italian: Pontificio Ateneo Sant'Anselmo), the Church of Sant'Anselmo (Italian: Chiesa Sant'Anselmo), and serves as the curial headquarters of the Confederation (Italian: Badia Sant'Anselmo).

=== College of Sant'Anselmo ===
The ecclesiastical residential College of Sant'Anselmo is juridically considered the successor of the homonymous college of the Cassinese Benedictine Congregation which was founded in 1687. The present college was reestablished in 1887 and moved to the newly constructed "Sant'Anselmo" on the Aventine Hill in 1896. Today the residential college houses an average of one hundred Benedictine monks from about forty countries, as well as other religious, diocesan priests, and lay people. As a house of formation, it offers a monastic environment for those who study at the onsite Pontifical Athenaeum of Saint Anselm or at other Roman pontifical universities. The present Prior of the college is Rev. Fr. Brendan Coffey OSB.

=== Pontifical Athenaeum of Sant'Anselmo ===
The Anselmianum, also known as the Pontifical Athenaeum of Saint Anselm (Italian: Pontificio Ateneo Sant'Anselmo; Latin: Pontificium Athenaeum Anselmianum), is the pontifical university in Rome associated with the Benedictines. The institution includes faculties of Philosophy, Theology (Sacramental Theology, Monastic Studies), the Institute of Historical Theology, as well as the Pontifical Institute of Liturgy. It grants certificates and diplomas in various subjects, as well as Bachelor, Licentiate, and Doctoral degrees. Originally the university exclusively served only Benedictines, but now is open to external students. The present Rector of the Athenaeum is to be confirmed.

=== Church of Sant'Anselmo ===
The church which was consecrated on November 11, 1900, and is constructed of three naves, divided by granite columns, and includes one main altar and two side altars. A large section on the east and west ends near the apse includes the traditional stalls for the monastic choir. The church serves as a place of worship for the Benedictine residential college community and the students of the Athenaeum. It is also known, especially to the Romans, for the performances of Gregorian chant offered by the monks during the Sunday liturgical celebrations of Vespers. Since 1962, the church has also been the starting point of the penitential procession presided over by the Pope on Ash Wednesday, and which ends at the basilica of Santa Sabina where the first stationary mass of Lent is celebrated. The present Rector of the church is Rev. Doroteo Toić, O.S.B.

== Gallery ==
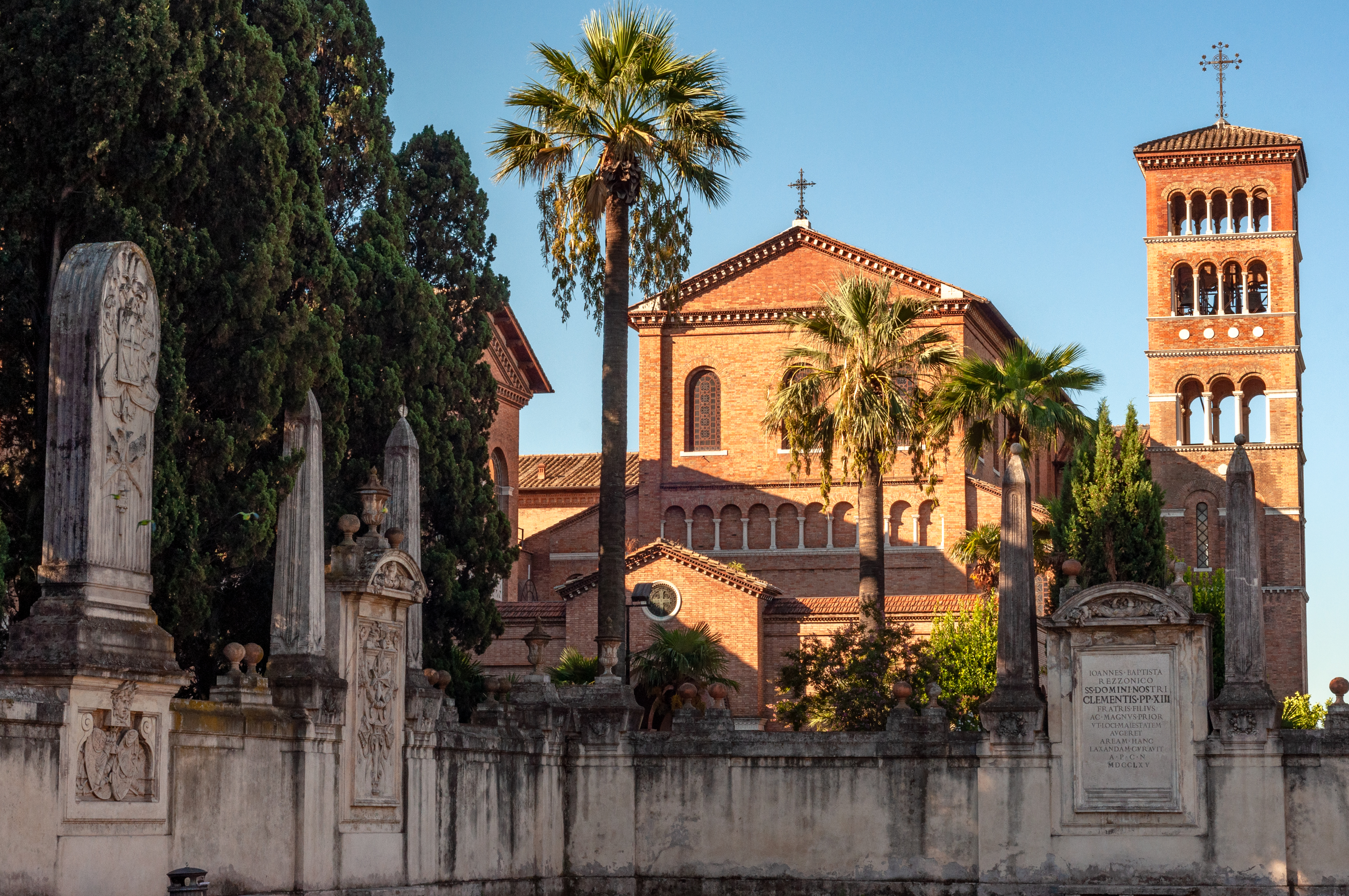

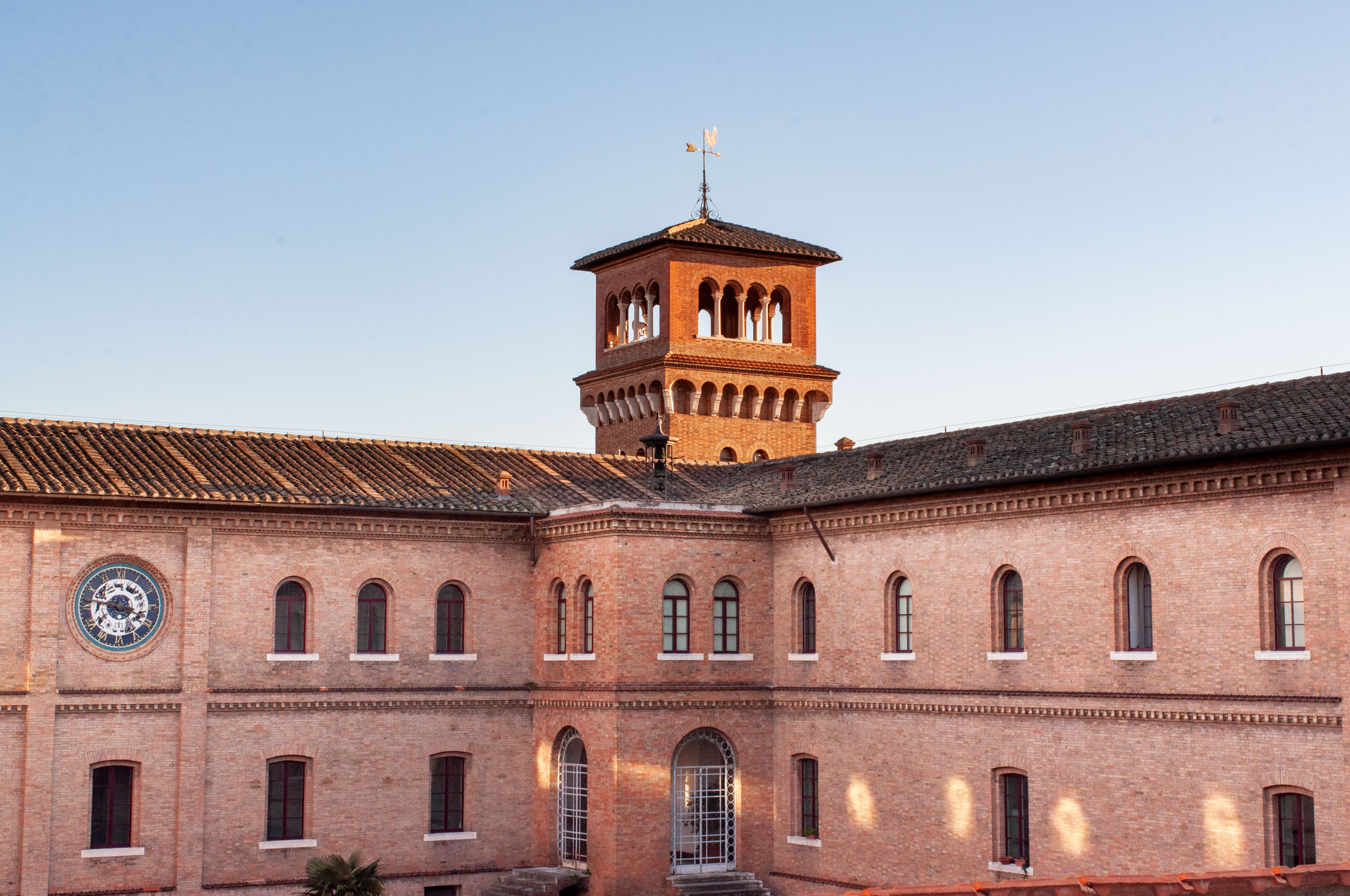

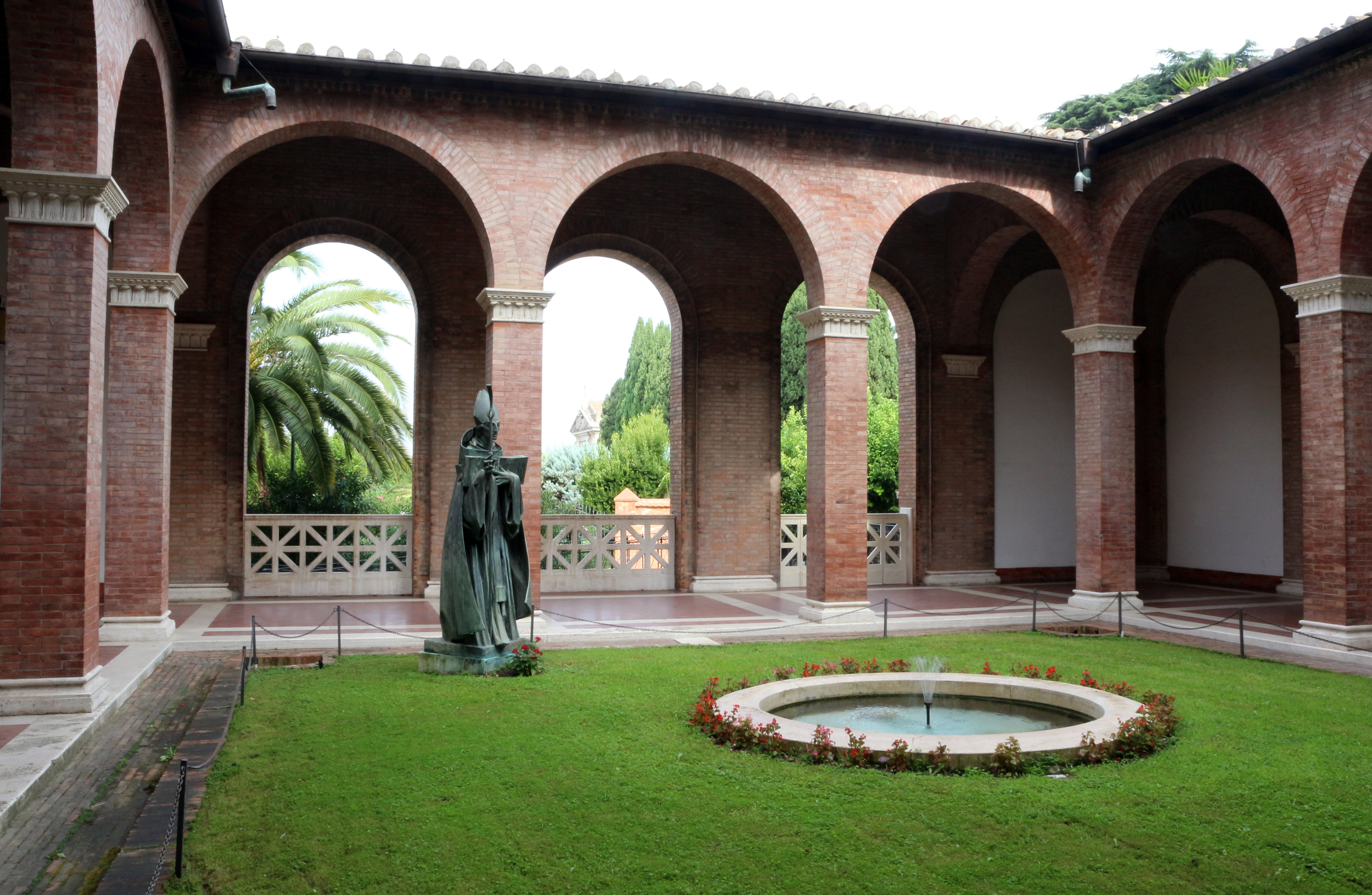

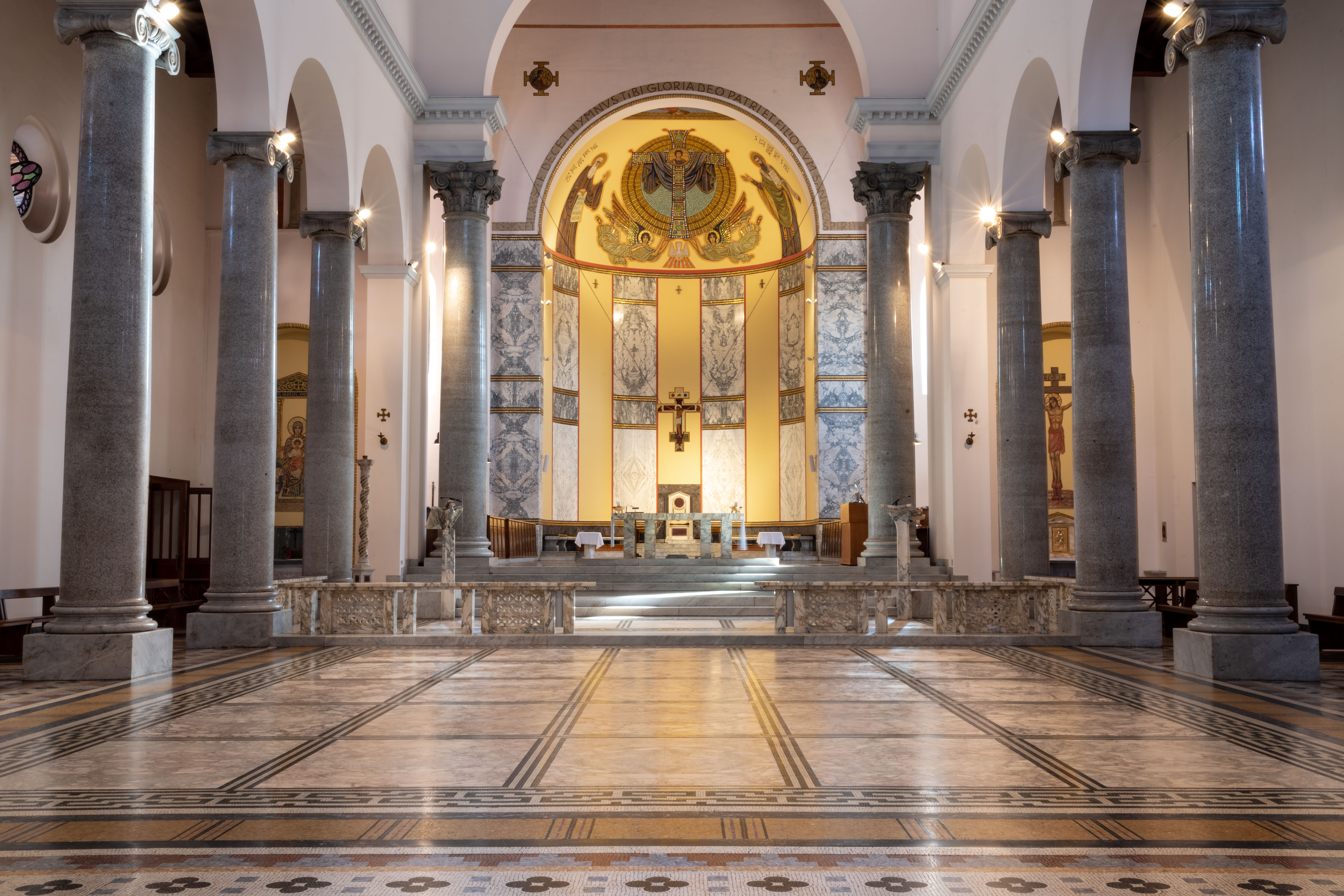

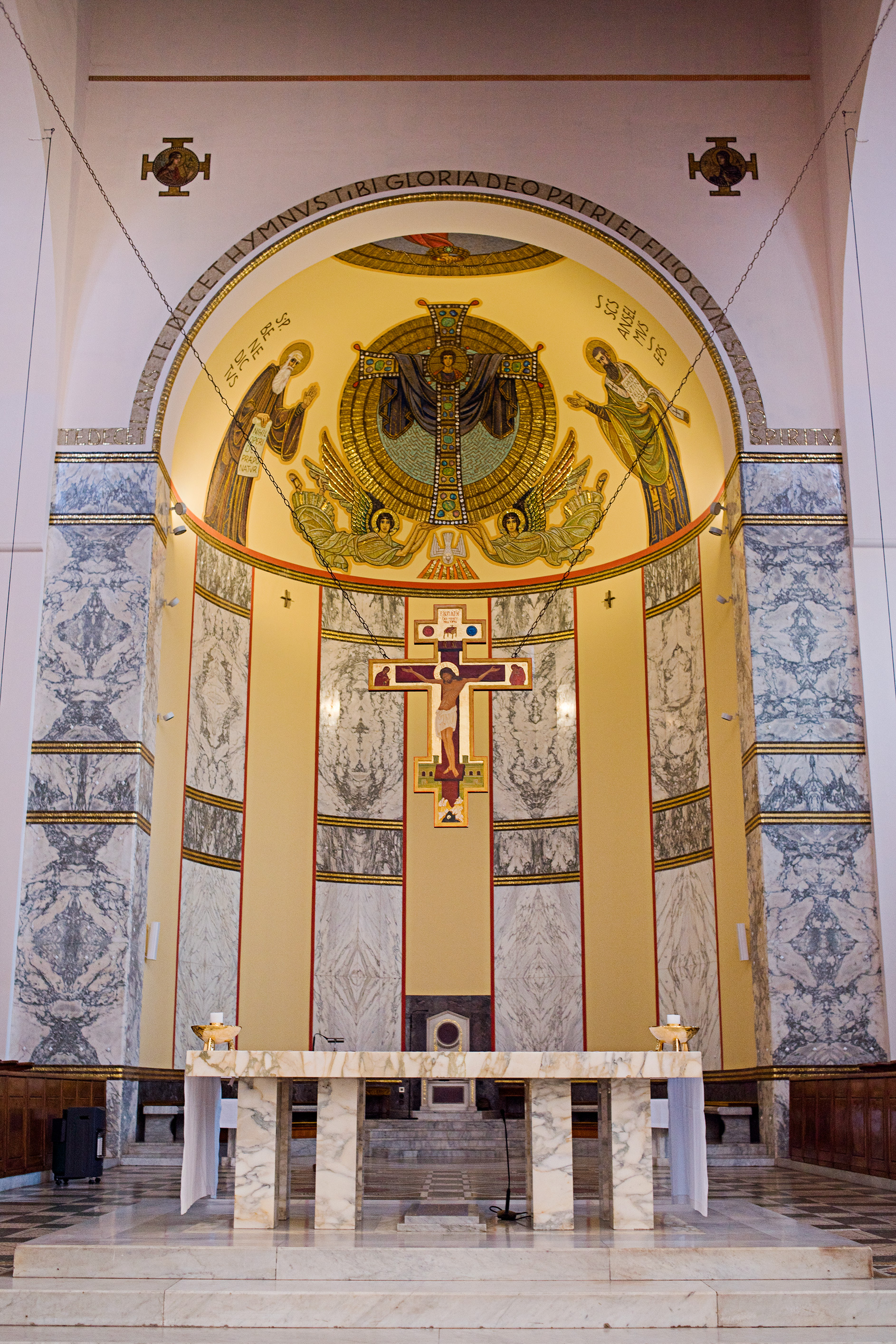

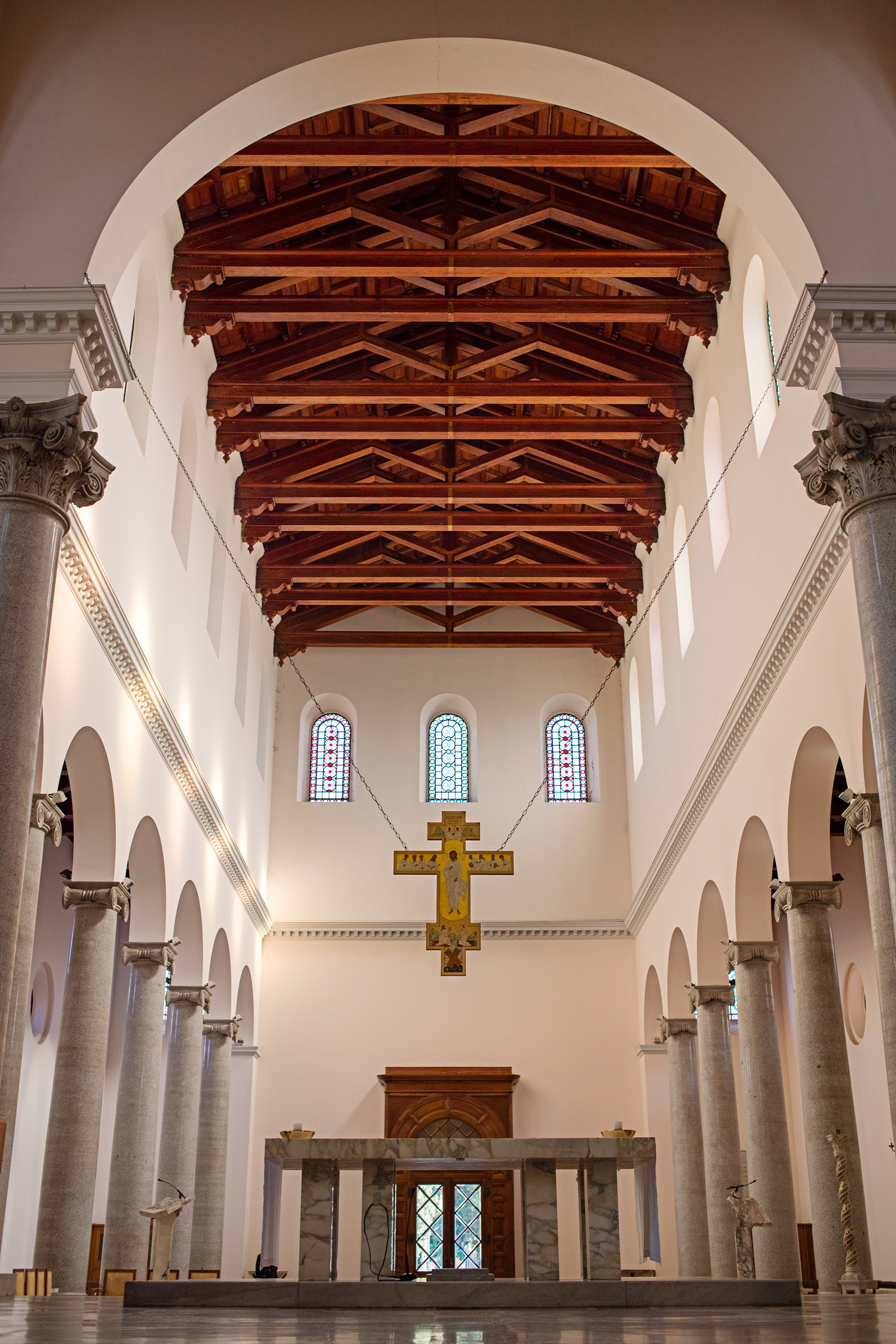

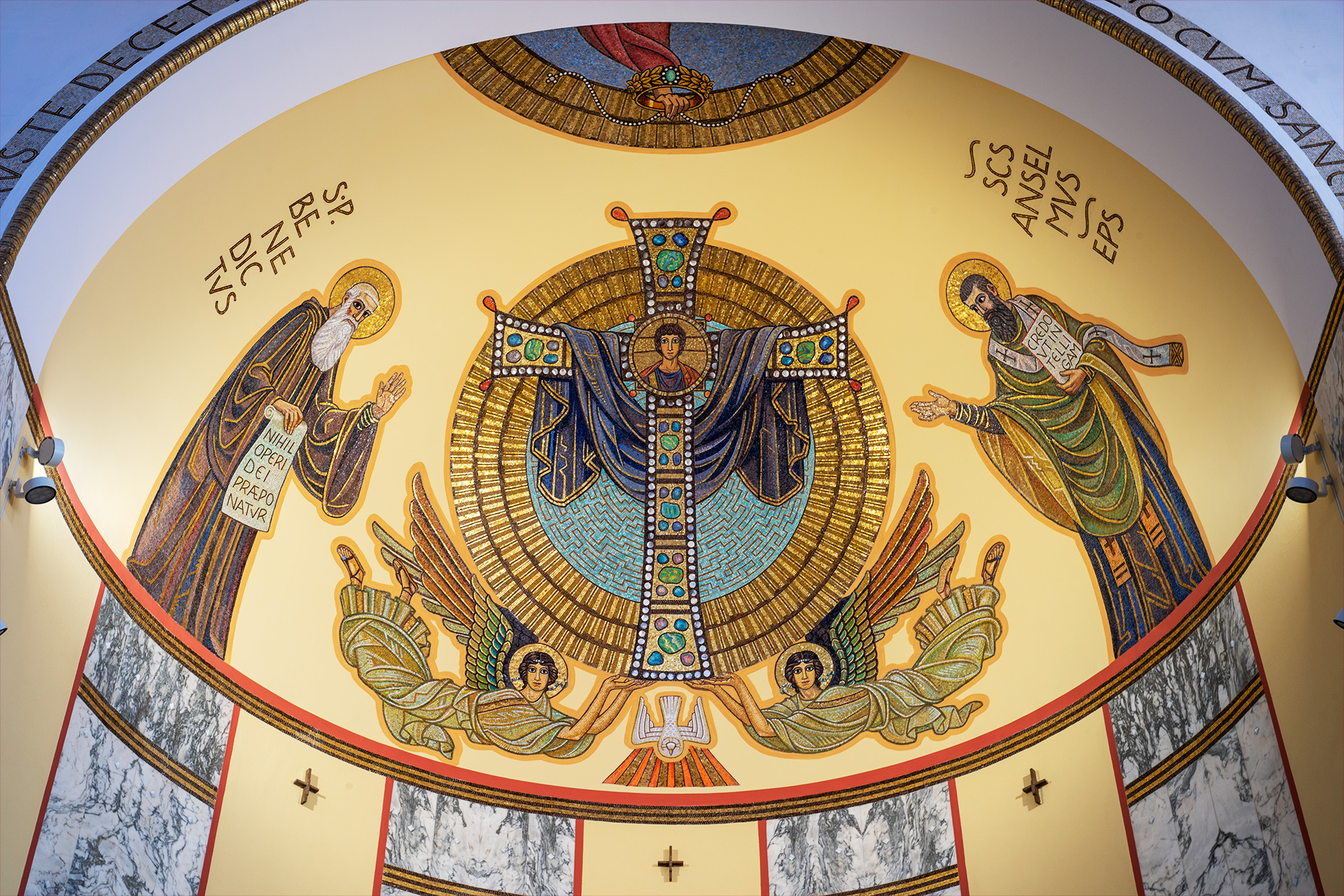

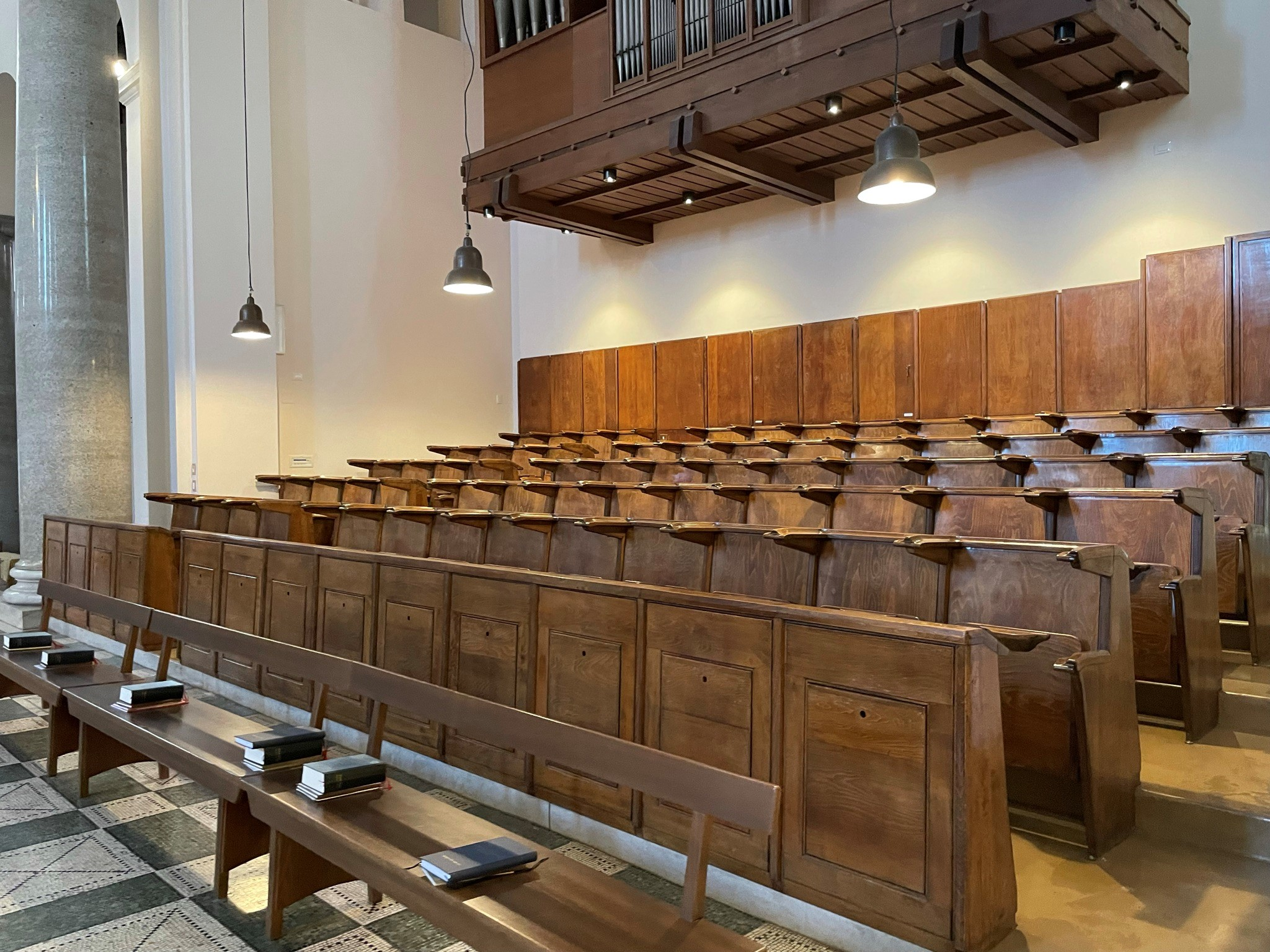

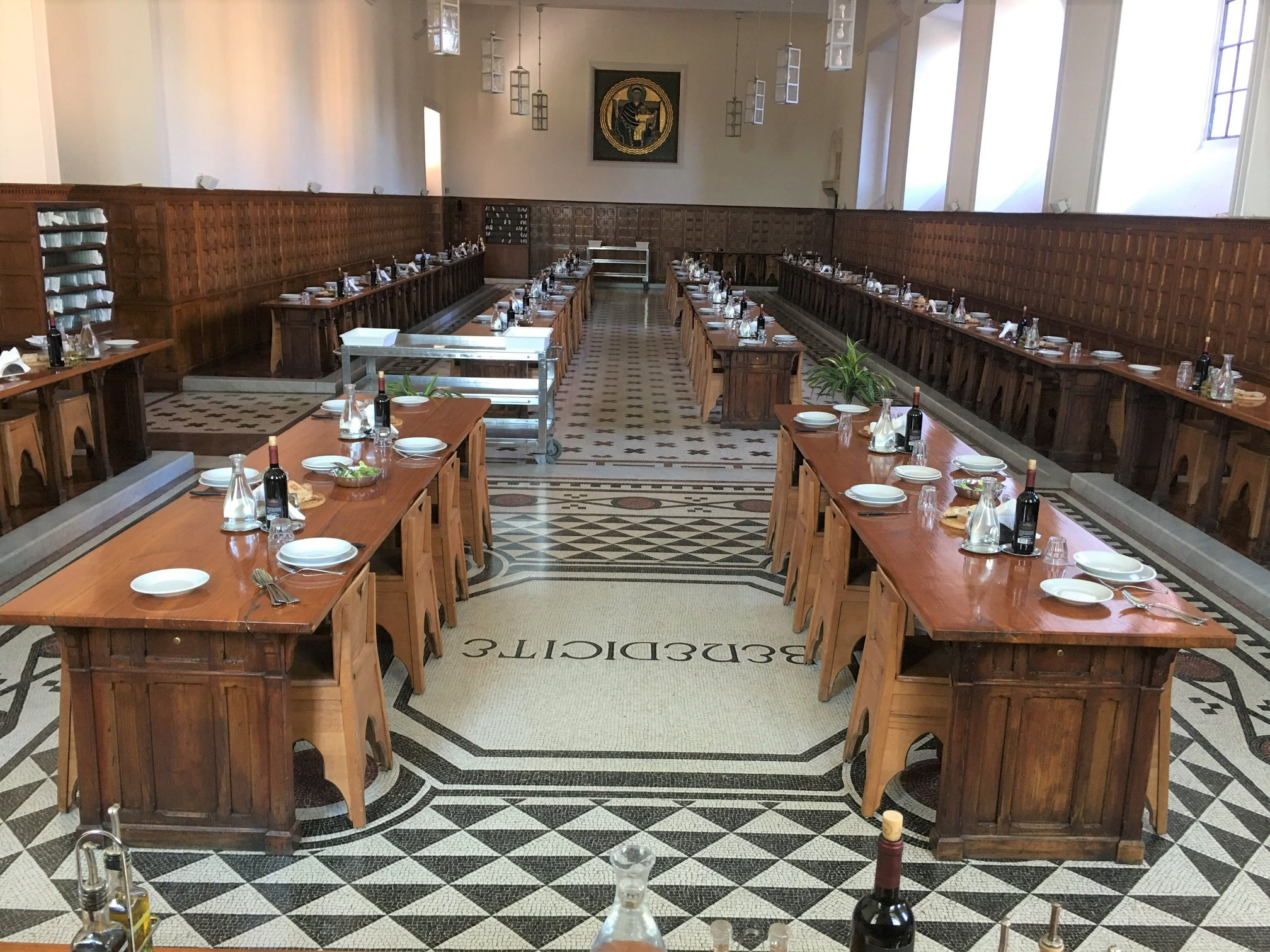

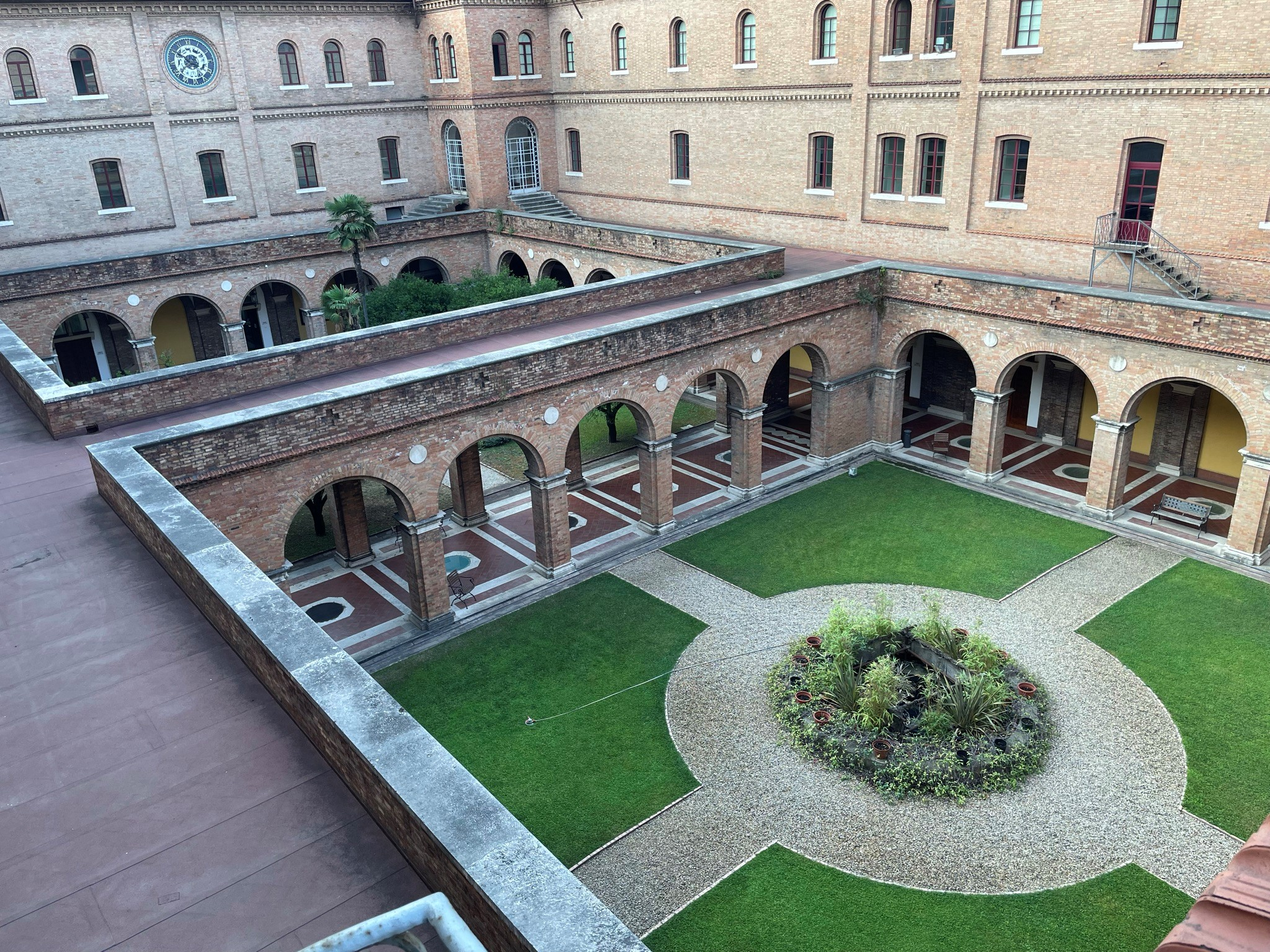
