= St. Ottilien Archabbey =

Benedictine monastery in Germany

Coordinates: 48°05′49″N 11°02′44″E

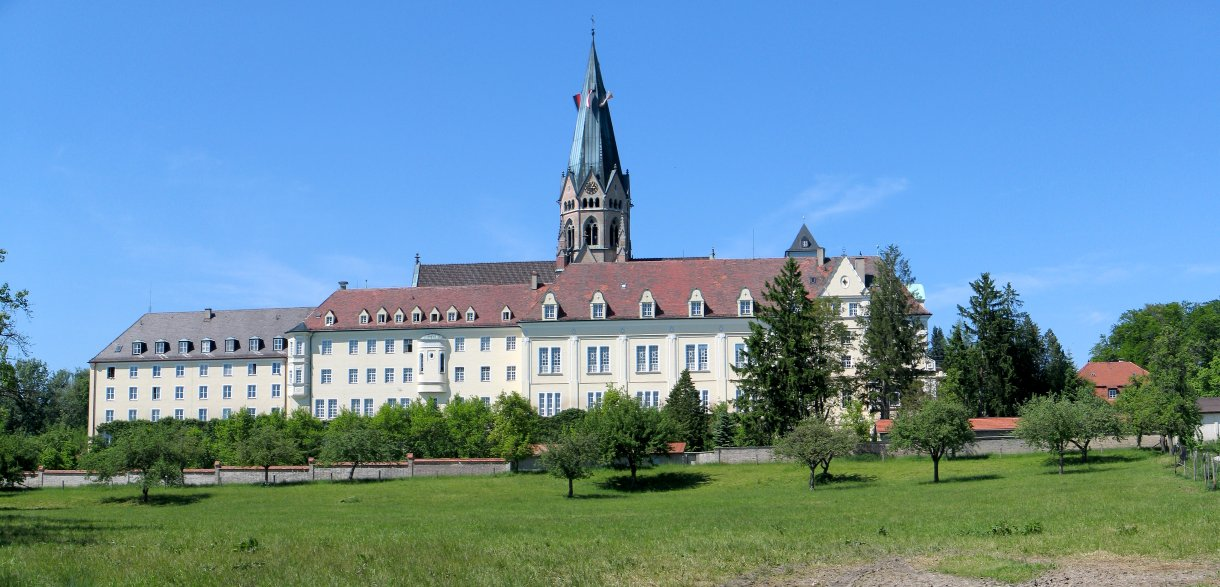
St. Ottilien Archabbey

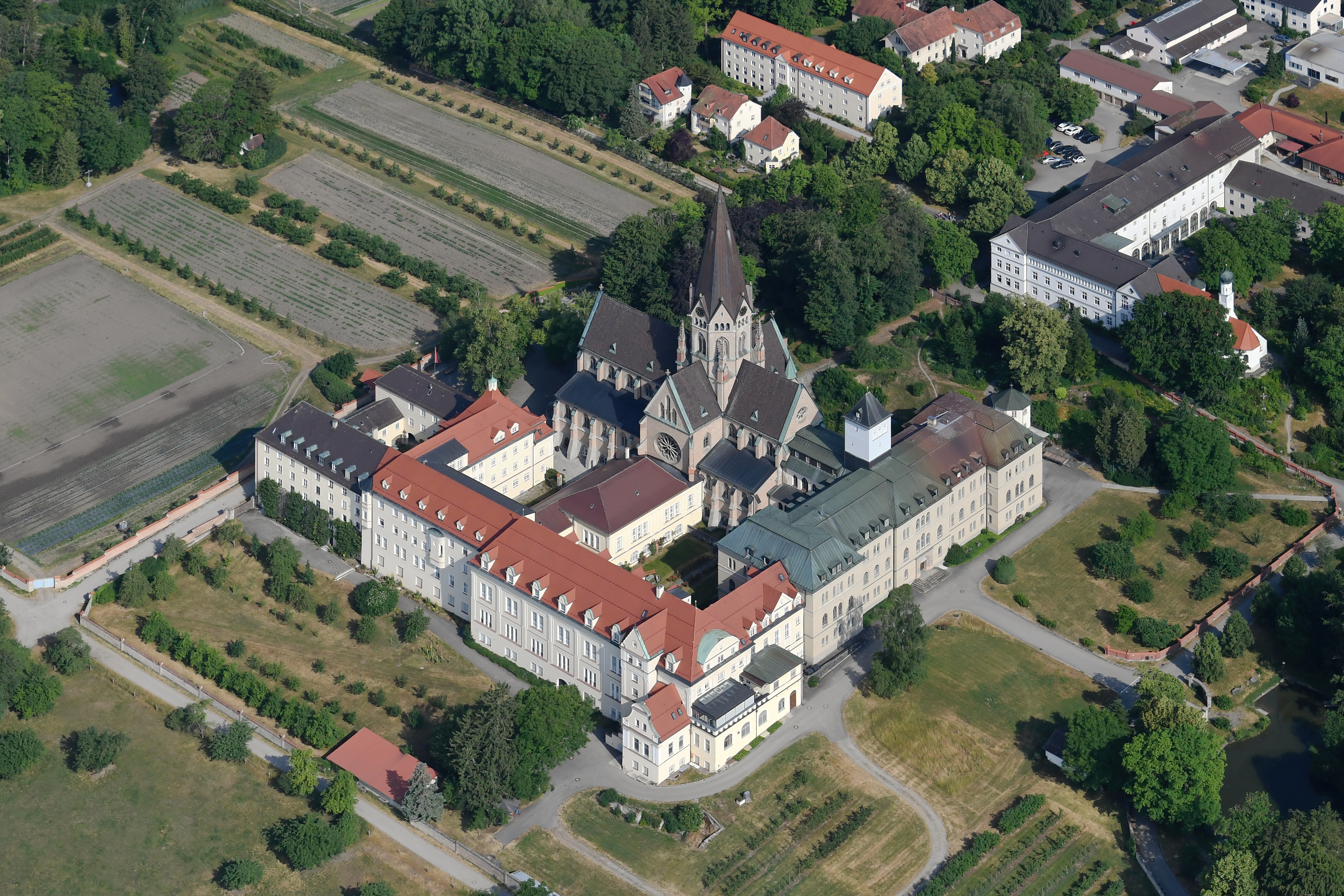
Aerial view

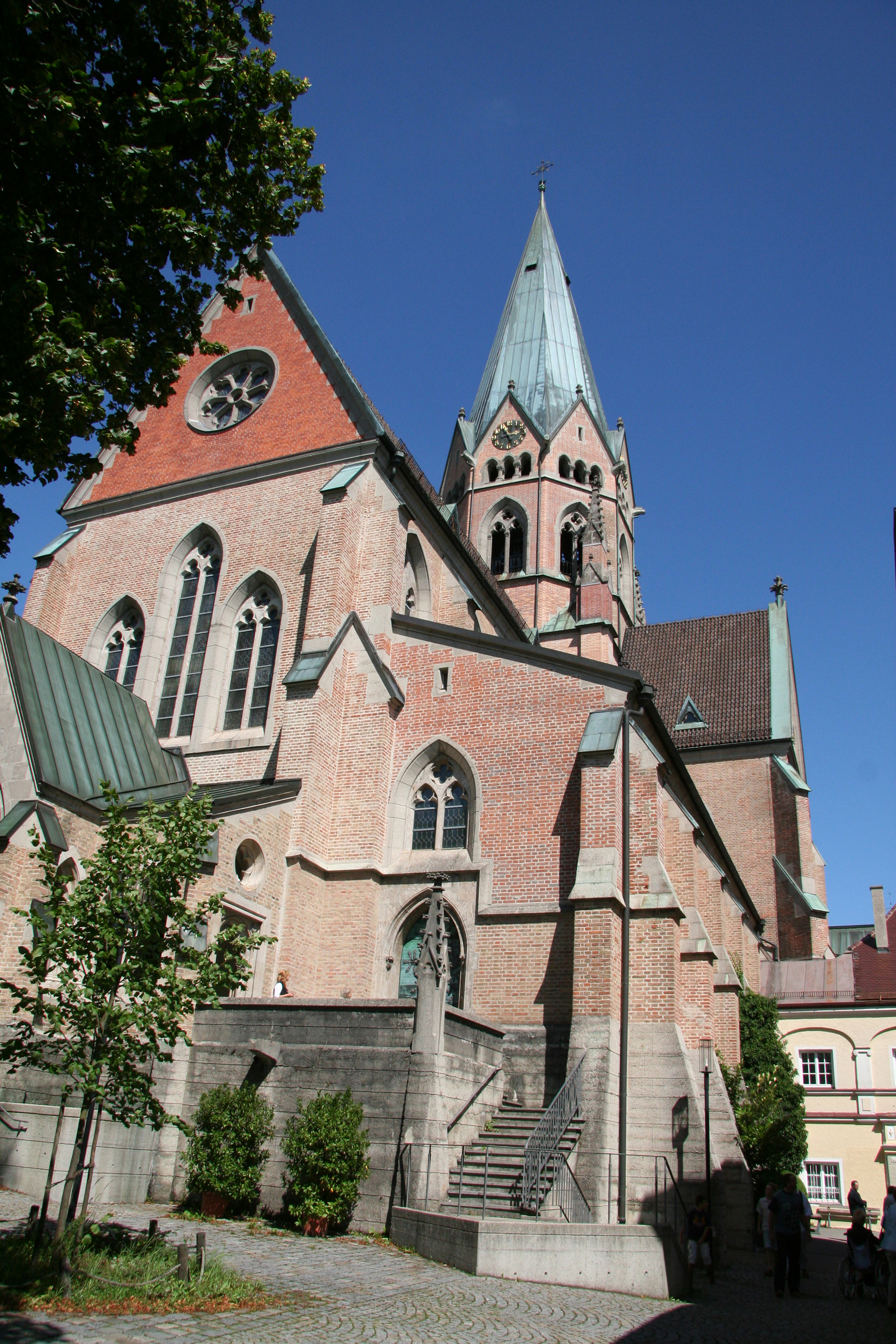
The monastery church (Herz-Jesu-Kirche)

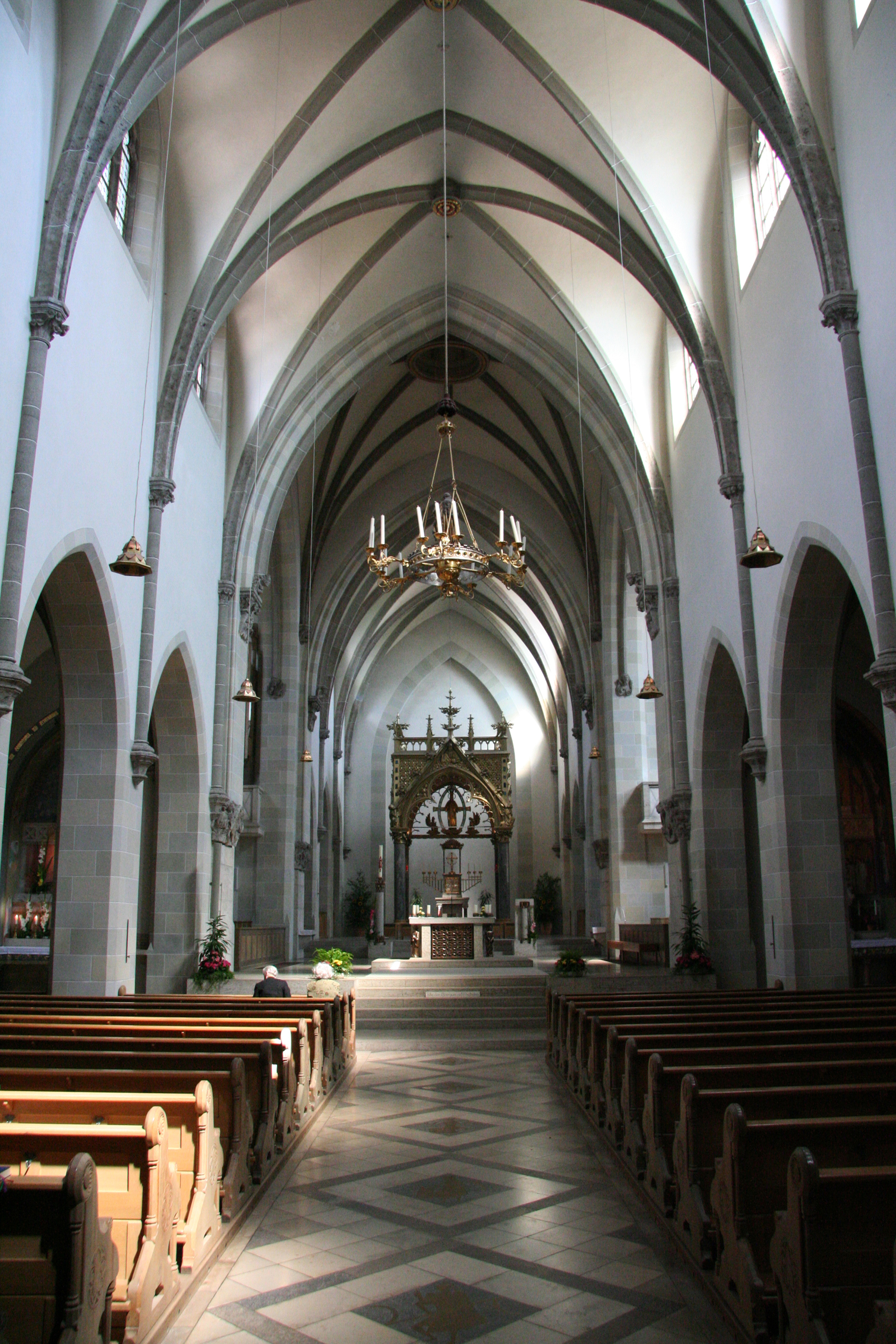
The monastery church inside

St. Ottilien Archabbey (St. Ottilia's Archabbey) is a Benedictine monastery in Emming near Eresing and the Ammersee in the district of Landsberg, Oberbayern, Germany. It is the motherhouse of the St. Ottilien Congregation.

== Foundation ==
In the 16th century a small castle was built at Emming, including a chapel dedicated to Saint Ottilia. Both castle and chapel were made over in the Baroque style in the 17th century.

After several changes of owner, and the demolition of much of the castle in 1884, in 1886 the estate came into the possession of Andreas Amrhein, formerly a Benedictine from Beuron Archabbey. His vision of combining the Benedictine way of life with engagement in the Christian mission field had proved impossible to realise within the Beuronese Congregation, and for that reason he sought to found a new and independent group. After an initial foundation in Reichenbach in the district of Cham in 1884, the community moved to Emming in 1887, where the monastery took its name from the already existing chapel of Saint Ottilia. In 1886/1887 the adjunct Rhabanus-Maurus-Gymnasium St. Ottilien was founded as a school for young Benedictine monks and the first group of missionaries were sent to Africa the same year.

== Development ==
In 1895 Andreas Amrhein resigned from the community, which then became a priory. In 1902 St. Ottilien was elevated to the status of an abbey. After the foundation of another three abbeys, St. Ottilien was chosen in 1914 as the archabbey of the Ottilien Congregation of the Benedictine Confederation, also known as the Missionary Benedictines. The Archabbot of St. Ottilien has ever since been ex officio the head of the congregation.

The abbey grew rapidly until 1930, developing missions in South Africa, Korea and China. St. Ottilien was extended during this period in order to accommodate the expanding community, which grew to almost 400 people.

In 1941 the abbey was suppressed by the Gestapo. The monks returned in 1945.

From April 1945 until May 1948 the abbey served as a Displaced Persons (DP) camp to some 5,000 concentration camp survivors. American soldier Robert Hilliard visited the camp and saw the performance of the St. Ottilien Orchestra, formed by Jewish musicians who survived in Holocaust. He saw the poor state of the camp, and started a campaign to change it. He succeeded by sending multiple letters, which eventually found their way to President Truman; it helped to provide change the conditions and provide better food, medicine, clothing, and the eventual ability to leave the camps and immigrate to other countries if they desired.

The abbey continued to sponsor the Rhabanus-Maurus-Gymnasium St. Ottilien until 1973, when this task was handed over to the Diocese of Augsburg. Both institutions still keep close ties as a part of the administration and teaching staff of the school is held by Benedictine monks.

== Buildings ==
The abbey church, dedicated to the Sacred Heart, was built between 1897 and 1899. Its pointed octagonal spire, 75 metres high, can be seen from a great distance around. In the bell tower hang eight bells, sounding one of the deepest tones in southern Germany.

The three-aisled Neo-Gothic abbey church was consecrated in 1903. The mission museum, in the Art Nouveau sacristy to the south of the church, was opened in 1911.

Over the years St. Ottilien has added many new facilities: a school (the Rhabanus Maurus Gymnasium), retreat- and guest-houses, a publishing house, workshops and buildings for farming and horticulture.

== People ==
=== Archabbots ===
- Norbert Weber (1902–1930)
- Chrysostomus Schmid (1930–1957)
- Suso Brechter (1957–1974)
- Viktor Josef Dammertz (1975–1977)
- Notker Wolf (1977–2000)
- Jeremias Schröder (2000–2012)
- Wolfgang Öxler (2012-)

=== Notable monks ===
- Josef Sauer (1877–1950), Servant of God, bishop of the Territorial Abbey of Tokwon, martyr in Korea
- Thomas Spreiter (1865–1944), bishop of Apostolic Vicariate of Natal
