= St. Mary's Abbey =

St Mary's Abbey may refer to:

== Ireland ==
- St. Mary's Abbey, Dublin
- St. Mary's Abbey, Glencairn
- St. Mary's Abbey, Trim

== Germany ==
- St. Mary's Abbey, Engelthal
- St. Mary's Abbey, Fulda

== United Kingdom ==
Wales

- St Mary's Abbey, Bardsey Island

England

- St Mary's Abbey, Kenilworth
- St Mary's Abbey, Leiston
- Abbey Church of St Mary, Nuneaton
- St Mary's Abbey, Thetford
- St Mary's Abbey, West Malling
- St Mary's Abbey, Winchester
- St Mary's Abbey, York

== United States ==
- St. Mary's Abbey, New Jersey
