= Anno Schoenen =

Abbot of Maria Laach

Anno Schoenen OSB (1 July 1925 in Essen – 21 March 2016) was a German Benedictine. He was abbot of Maria Laach Abbey (1990–2002) and presiding abbot of the Beuronese Congregation (1995–2008).

== Life ==
He was born Heribert Schoenen, the youngest child of a mercantile family from Essen. He was called up in 1943 and was badly wounded on the Eastern Front before being captured. He returned to Germany at the end of the war and studied philosophy and theology in Bonn, particularly under Friedrich Nötscher and Heinrich Joseph Vogels. In 1946 he entered the community at Maria Laach Abbey under abbot Ildefons Herwegen and received the religious name Anno. On August 24, 1948, he took his first monastic vows and in 1952 he was ordained a priest, becoming chief assistant to novice master Basilius Ebel. He was at Herstelle Abbey from 1957 to 1989, working alongside abbess Beatrix Kolck.

On 4 November 1990 he succeeded Adalbert Kurzeja OSB (born 1920) when he was elected 48th abbot of Maria Laach Abbey. He was installed at the abbey on saint Anno's day by Herman Josef Spital, bishop of Trier. His motto was Honore invicem praeveniant (Romans 12.10). He resigned on age grounds in 2002. From 1995 to 2008 he was also presiding abbot of the Beuronese Congregation.

Schoenen was strongly influenced by Rudolf Tippmann and E. Nüßlein, who had taught him pastoral studies, liturgy and religion at Essen, and by Max Josef Metzger.

== Works ==
- Maria in der Kirche. Väterwort und Gotteslob, Pustet, Regensburg 1955, with Emmanuel von Severus OSB.
- Die Familie Gotteswerk und Menschenmühen, Verlag Ars Liturgica, Maria Laach 1958.
- Heute wenn ihr seine Stimme hört. Band 1: Advent bis Pfingsten, Pustet, Regensburg 1966.
- Heute wenn ihr seine Stimme hört. Band 2: Sonn- und Festtage nach Pfingsten, Pustet, Regensburg 1967.
- Heute wenn ihr seine Stimme hört. Kurzpredigten zum Kirchenjahr, Pustet, Regensburg 1968.
- Die Weihnachtsbotschaft. 38 Predigten., Pustet, Regensburg 1969, zusammen mit Karl Lehmann und Ambrosius Karl Ruf.
- Erscheinung des Herrn, Düsseldorf 1993.
