= Albert Schmidt (monk) =

German Benedictine monk

Albert Schmidt OSB (born 1948, Freiburg im Breisgau) is a German Benedictine monk and presiding abbot of the Beuronese Congregation, an association of eighteen mostly German or German-speaking Benedictine monasteries and convents, headed by Beuron Abbey in the upper Danube Valley. This makes him the Congregation's highest ranking dignitary and a High Superior in church law terms.

== Life ==
The son of a Benedictine oblate, he took his vows as a Benedictine monk in Beuron in 1967. He studied theology and philosophy and gained a theology doctorate in Rome before moving to Beuron Abbey. In 1973 he was ordained a priest and in 1992 he became student secretary at the Kolleg St. Benedikt in Salzburg. From 1997 to 2005 he was rector of the Pontifical Atheneum of St. Anselm in Rome. Since 2006 he has been editor of the Benedictine journal.

On 16 April 2008 he was made presiding abbot of the Beuronese Congregation by its 24th General Chapter, succeeding Anno Schoenen (Maria Laach Abbey). He was installed in this post by bishop Robert Zollitschon 19 April 2008 in the abbey church. His motto is Habitare in Unum ("to live as one", quoting Psalm 133). From 16 November 2009 to its dissolution in 2010 he was also administrator of Weingarten Abbey.

== Works ==
- Zusätze als Problem des monastischen Stundengebets im Mittelalter, (Beiträge zur Geschichte des alten Mönchtums und des Benediktinertums; 36), Aschendorff, Münster 1986, ISBN 3-402-03289-9.
- with Andreas Felger: Unterwegs zum Leben. Gedanken der Benediktsregel. Mit einem Geleitwort von Kardinal Walter Kasper, Präsenz Verlag / Beuroner Kunstverlag, Gnadenthal / Beuron 2008, ISBN 978-3-87071-184-9.
- with Christel Holl: Davonlaufen oder dableiben. Mit Psalmen leben lernen, Beuroner Kunstverlag, Beuron 2015, ISBN 978-3-87071-323-2.
