= Clementia Killewald =

German Benedictine nun (1954–2016)

Clementia Killewald OSB
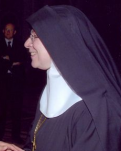
- Mother Clementia in 2012
- Born: Elisabeth Killewald; 25 April 1954; Duisburg, West Germany
- Died: 2 July 2016 (aged 62); Rüdesheim am Rhein, Germany
- Occupation: Abbess
- Organizations: Eibingen Abbey

Clementia Killewald OSB (born Elisabeth Killewald, 25 April 1954 – 2 July 2016) was a German Benedictine nun at Eibingen Abbey. She served first as an organist, then took care of the elderly and sick, and finally from 2000 she served as abbess. She introduced the life and work of Saint Hildegard of Bingen, the founder of the abbeys of Rupertsberg and Eibingen, during the 2012 ceremony when Pope Benedict XVI proclaimed Hildegard a Doctor of the Church.

== Life ==
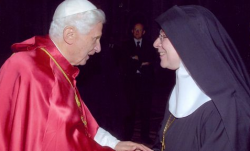
Mother Clementia with Pope Benedict XVI (left) on 7 October 2012

Elisabeth Killewald was born on 25 April 1954 in Duisburg, West Germany. The oldest of nine siblings, she grew up in Dinslaken and she received the Abitur from the Lise-Meitner-Gymnasium in Geldern. She studied first church music and flute at the Hochschule für Musik Mainz. She joined the Benedictine Abbey St. Hildegard in Eibingen in 1976, assumed the religious name Clementia (kindness) and made her temporary vows on her 25th birthday, 25 April 1979.

At the abbey, she worked first as an organist and member of the Choralschola, then took care of the elderly and sick in the infirmary. In the summer of 2000 she was chosen by the convent to succeed Edeltraud Forster as abbess. She was dedicated on 3 October 2000 by Bishop Franz Kamphaus.

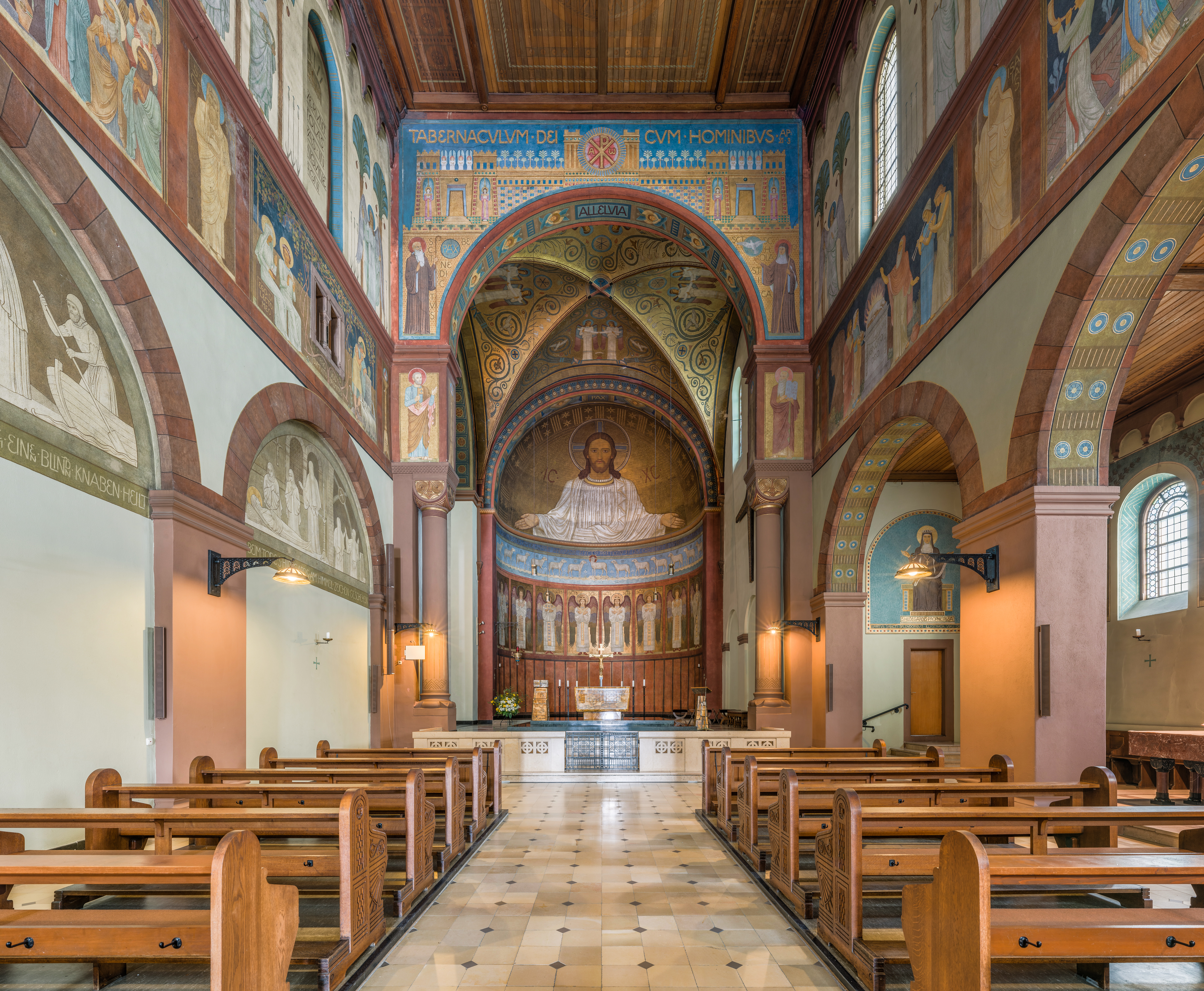
Nave and sanctuary of the Abtei St. Hildegard

As the abbess, she regularly led the annual procession on the feast of Hildegard on 17 September with her shrine carried through the streets. She lectured about Hildegard, for example at the Liborifest of the Diocese of Paderborn in the presence of Archbishop Hans-Josef Becker in 2010. When Hildegard was proclaimed a Doctor of the Church on 7 October 2012 by Pope Benedikt XVI, Mother Clementia introduced Hildegard's life and work on St. Peter's Square during the ceremony.

She resigned for health reasons on 27 May 2016, accepted by Albert Schmidt. She died in Rüdesheim am Rhein on 2 July 2016 after severe illness.

== Publications ==
Mother Clementia worked as an editor of the works by Hildegard of Bingen, in new translations from Latin, published by the Beuroner Kunstverlag:

- Wisse die Wege. Works, vol. I, translated by Mechthild Heieck. 2010, ISBN 978-3-87071-211-2.
- Ursprung und Behandlung der Krankheiten. Causae et Curae. Works, vol. II, translated by Ortrun Riha. 2011, ISBN 978-3-87071-248-8.
- Lieder Symphoniae. Works, vol. IV, translated by Barbara Stühlmeyer. 2012, ISBN 978-3-87071-263-1.
- Heilsame Schöpfung – Die natürliche Wirkkraft der Natur. Physica. Works, vol. V, translated by Ortrun Riha. 2012, ISBN 978-3-87071-271-6.
- Das Buch vom Wirken Gottes – Liber Divinorum Operum. Works, vol. VI, translated by Mechthild Heieck. 2012, ISBN 978-3-87071-272-3.
- Briefe. Epistulae. Works, vol. VIII, 2012, ISBN 978-3-87071-285-3.
- Barbara Stühlmeyer, Sabine Böhm: Tugenden und Laster. Wegweisung im Dialog mit Hildegard von Bingen, 2012, ISBN 978-3-87071-287-7.
- Das Leben der heiligen Hildegard von Bingen. Vitae sanctae Hildegardis. Works, vol. III, translated by Monika Klaes-Hachmöller, with an introduction by Michael Embach. 2013, ISBN 978-3-87071-262-4.
- Das Buch der Lebensverdienste. Liber vitae meritorum. Works, vol. VII, translated by Sr. Maura Zatonyi OSB. 2014, ISBN 978-3-87071-314-0.

== Awards ==
The composer Ludger Stühlmeyer dedicated his Quatre pièces pour Orgue:Prélude romantique, Caprice expressionique, Hymne impressionique, Fugue baroque in 2001 to her, "Äbtissin Clementia zugeeignet" (dedicated to Abbess Clementia). It was published by the Sonat-Verlag in 2013, ISMN 979-0-50235-058-1.
