= Eibingen Abbey =

Eibingen Abbey Abtei St. Hildegard
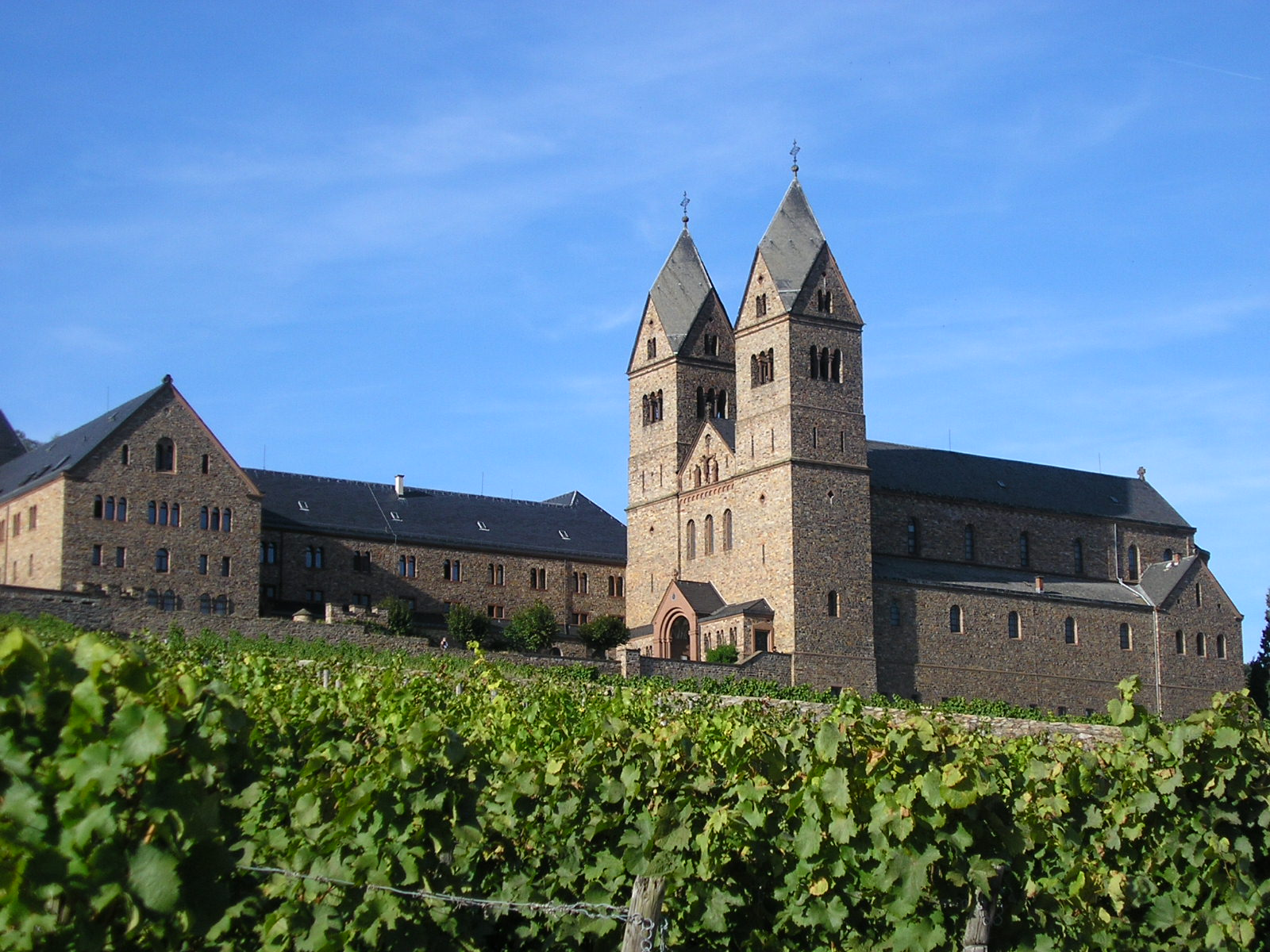
- 49°59′33″N 7°55′41″E
- Location: Eibingen, Germany
- Denomination: Catholic

Architecture
- Style: Romanesque revival
- Groundbreaking: 1900s

Administration
- Diocese: Diocese of Limburg

UNESCO World Heritage Site
- Official name: Upper Middle Rhine Valley
- Type: Cultural
- Criteria: ii, iv, v
- Designated: 2002
- Reference no.: 1066
- Region: Europe and North America

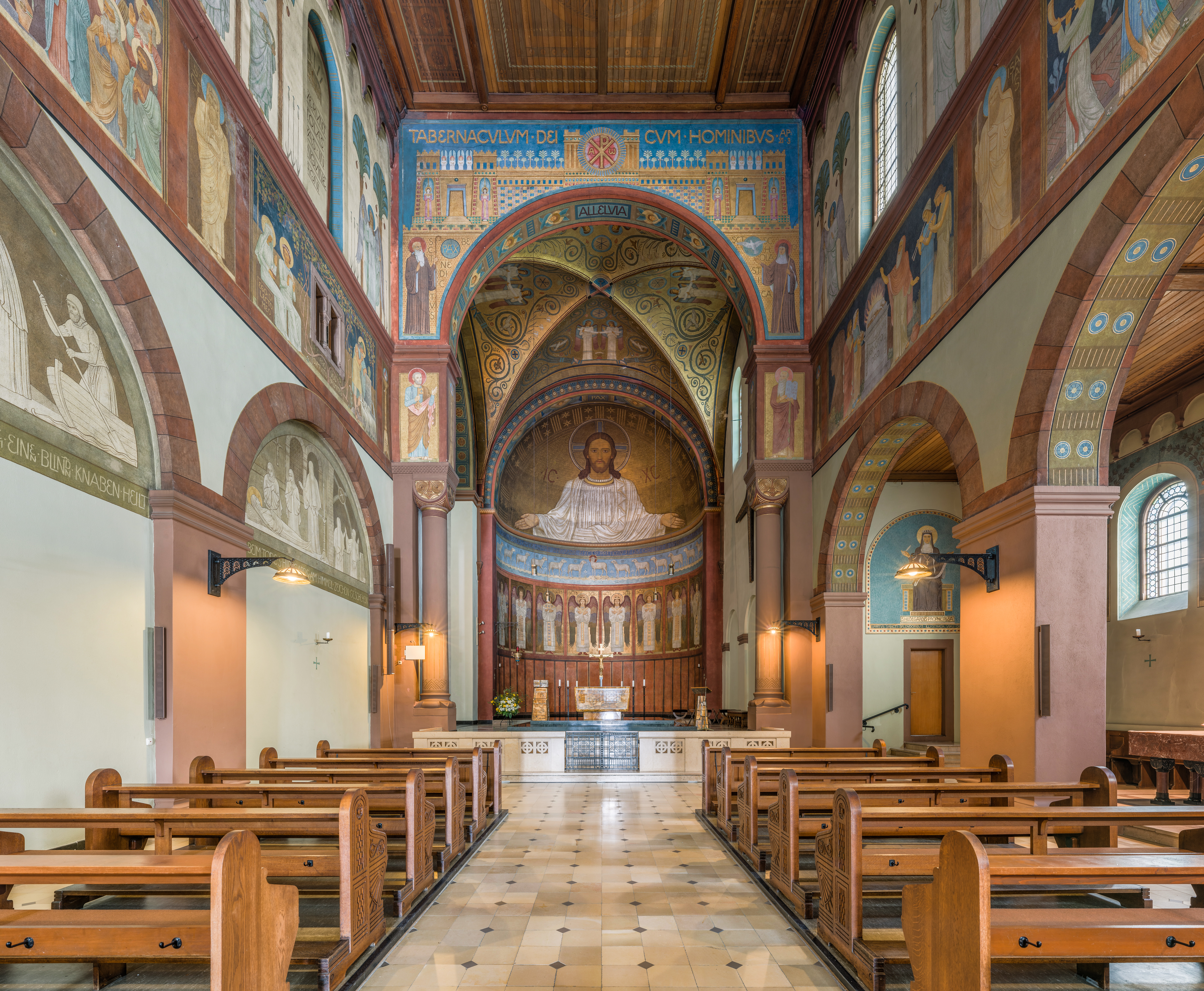
Church's interior with paintings of the Beuron Art School

Eibingen Abbey (German: Abtei St. Hildegard, full name: Benedictine Abbey St. Hildegard) is a community of Benedictine nuns in Eibingen near Rüdesheim in Hesse, Germany. Founded by Hildegard of Bingen in 1165, it was dissolved in 1804, but restored, with new buildings, in 1904. The nuns produce wine and crafts. They sing regular services, which have been at times recorded. The church is also used as a concert venue. The abbey is a Rhine Gorge World Heritage Site.

== History ==
The original community was founded in 1165 by Hildegard of Bingen. This was the second community founded by her. It was disestablished in 1804. After the Reichsdeputationshauptschluss (German mediatization), the land once owned by the convent became part of the domains of the prince of Nassau-Weilburg who, in 1831, even bought both the monastery and its church.

The community was reestablished by Charles, 6th Prince of Löwenstein-Wertheim-Rosenberg in 1904 and resettled from St. Gabriel's Abbey in Prague. The nunnery belongs to the Beuronese Congregation within the Benedictine Confederation. A new building was erected in Neo-Romanesque style. In 1941, the nuns were expelled by the Nazis; they were not able to return until 1945. In 1988, the sisters founded Marienrode Priory at Hildesheim, which became independent of Eibingen in 1998.

The nuns work in the vineyard and in the craft workshops, besides undertaking the traditional duties of hospitality. They are singing or reciting the canonical hours. The nuns have recorded their Vespers and other parts of the liturgy. A first recording was made in 1973 and contained only two works by Hildegard of Bingen, a Kyrie and O virga ac diadema. A second recording appeared in 1979, to remember the 800th anniversary of Hildegard's death, including the same pieces and antiphones, a hymn, a responsory and parts of Ordo virtutum. In 1989, a third recording appeared, conducted by P. Johannes Berchmans Göschl, a scholar of Gregorian chant. A reviewer of Gramophone noted about a 1998 recording: "These nuns are living the same life as that of Hildegard's community, singing daily the same Benedictine Office, breathing the same air and trying to capture the spirit of their great twelfth-century predecessor."

== Abbesses ==
- Hildegard of Bingen (1098–1179), first abbess and founder of the community

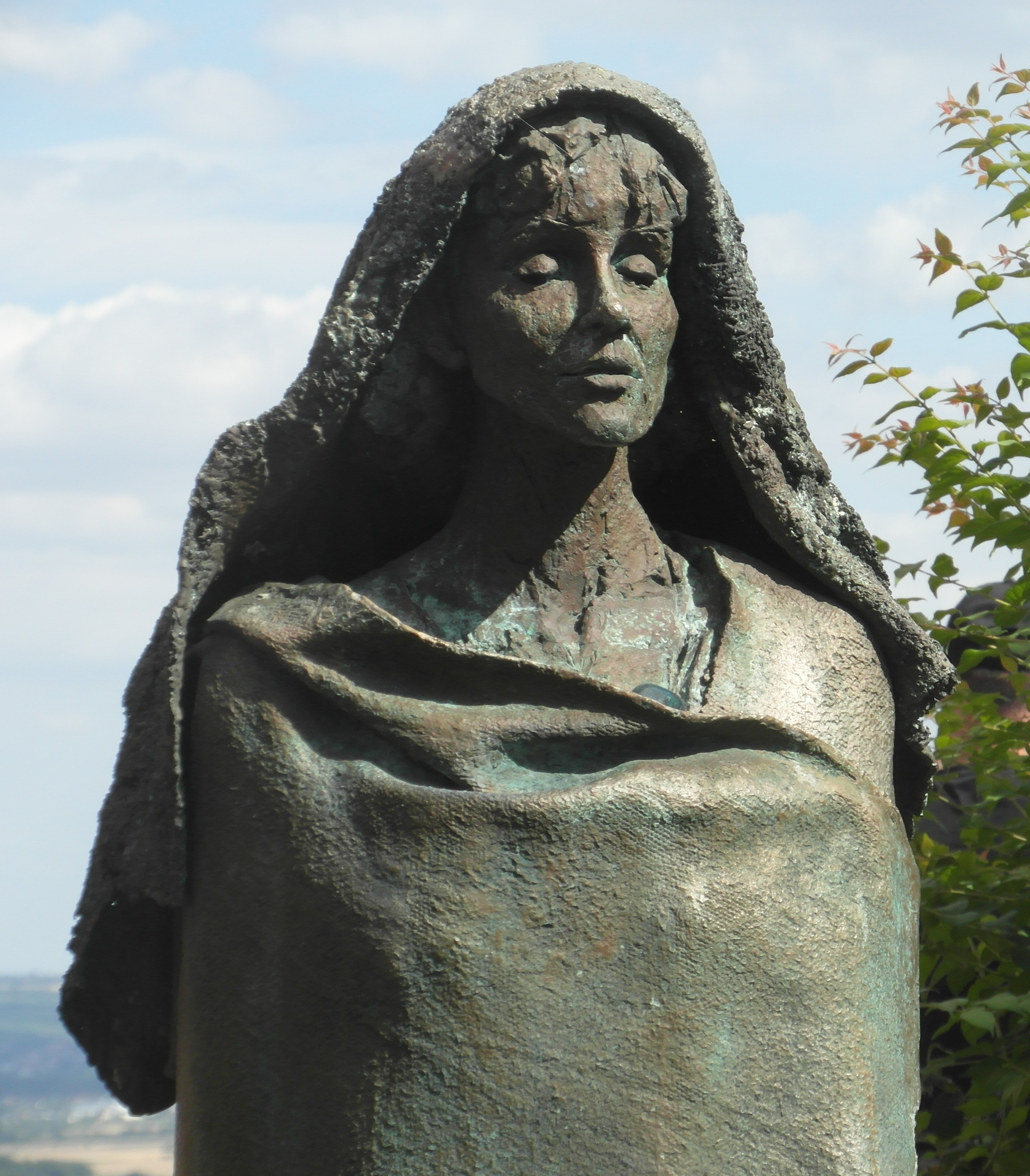
Statue of Hildegard of Bingen, bronze by Karlheinz Oswald (1998)

From 1603 the abbesses held the title of "Abbess of Rupertsberg and Eibingen".

- Kunigunde Frey von Dehrn, abbess around 1600
- Anna Lerch von Dirmstein, abbess until 1666
- Kunigunde Schütz von Holtzhausen, abbess from 1666 to 1669
- Scholastica von Manteuffel, abbess from 1670
- Maria Antonetta Mühl zu Ulmen, abbess from 1711

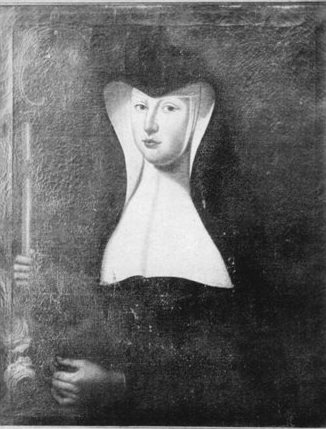
Philippine zu Guttenberg, last abbess of the convent prior to the German mediatization

- Philippine zu Guttenberg, last abbess from 1790 to 1804.

Since the re-establishment of the community in 1904:

- Regintrudis Sauter, abbess from 1908 to 1955
- Fortunata Fischer, abbess from 1955 to 1978
- Edeltraut Forster, abbess from 1978 to 1998
- Gisela Happ, prioress-administrator from 1998 to 2000
- Clementia Killewald, abbess from 2000 to 2016
- Dorothea Flandera, abbess from 2016 to 2023
- Katharina Drouvé; abbess since 2023

== Heritage ==
The abbey is a Rhine Gorge World Heritage Site. The church has been a venue for concerts of the Rheingau Musik Festival, such as a "BachTrompetenGala" with organist Edgar Krapp and a concert with the New York Polyphony in 2014. The sculptor Karlheinz Oswald made in 1998 a life-size bronze statue called Hildegard of Bingen, with one copy in the Bingen museum, another in the garden in front of the abbey church.
