= St. Gabriel's Abbey, Prague =

Former monastery in Prague

St. Gabriel's Abbey
- Klášter svatého Gabriela
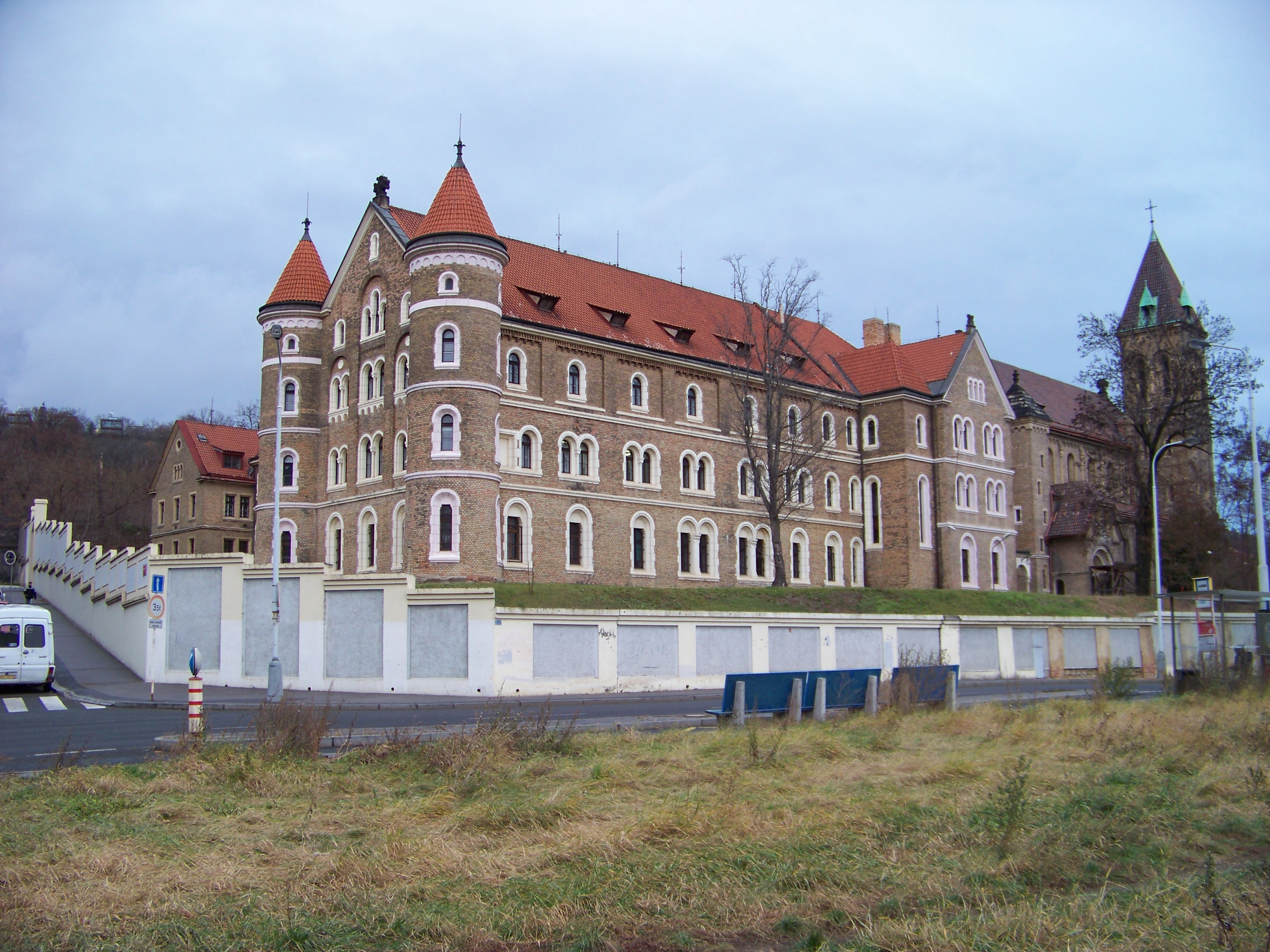
- Interactive map of the St. Gabriel's Abbey area

General information
- Location: Prague 5, Holečkova 106/10, Prague 5, 150 00, Czech Republic
- Coordinates: 50.0754°N 14.3969°E
- Completed: 1891

Website
- Official website

St. Gabriel's Abbey or Monastery (Czech: Klášter svatého Gabriela) is a former Benedictine nunnery of the Beuron Congregation in Smíchov, Prague, Czech Republic. It was built in the years 1888–1891, in the distinctive Beuronese style, by the congregation's architects Hildebrand de Hemptinne and Ghislain de Béthune. Initially a priory, it was raised to the status of an abbey in 1893. The nuns were forced to move to Austria in 1919.

From then until 2019 the building belonged to the state and was used by state postal organizations, including the Prague Postal Museum. Since 2019 it has been privately owned by a property development company.

The church now known as the Church of the Annunciation, popularly called St. Gabriel's, was formerly the conventual church. Since 22 December 1964, both the monastery and the church have been registered as cultural monuments.

The community of nuns dispossessed in 1919 moved to Schloss Bertholdstein in Pertlstein in Styria, Austria, until in 2007 they left the Beuronese Congregation to join the Federation of the Sisters of Saint Lioba, and, as St. Gabriel's Priory once again, moved to Sankt Johann bei Herberstein in Feistritztal.

== Gallery ==
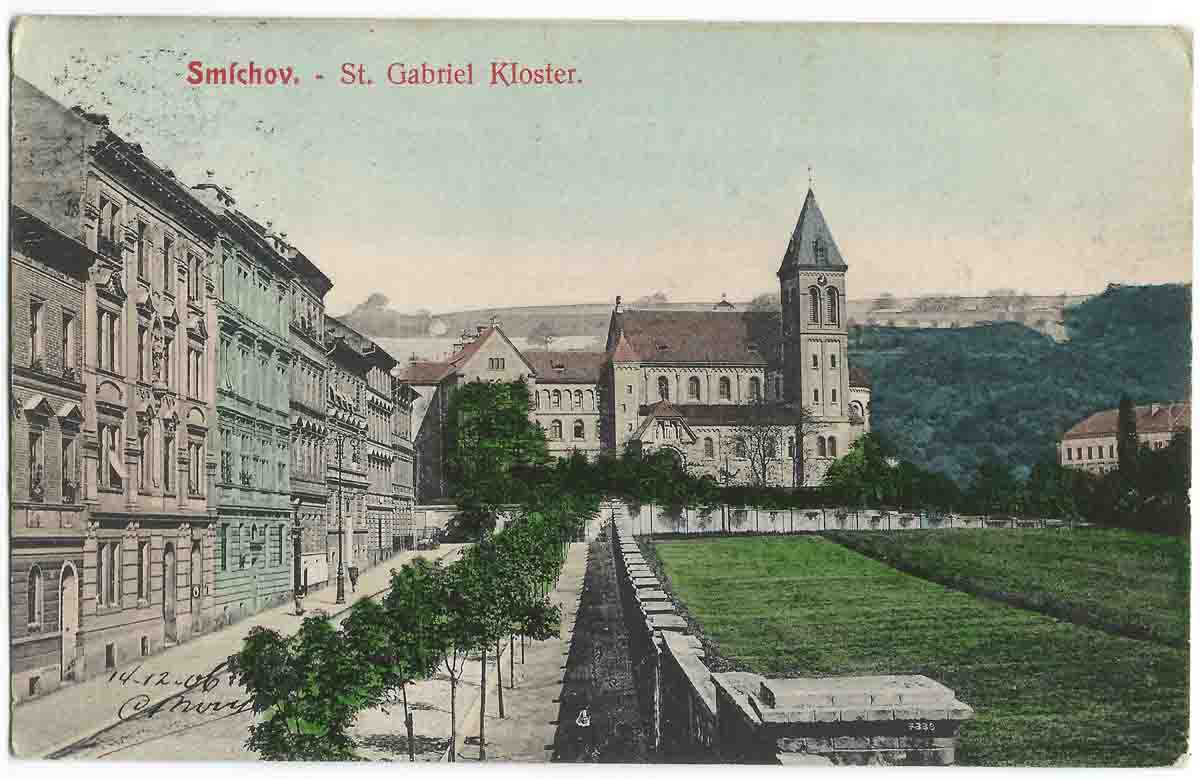
Postcard of the abbey, early 20th century

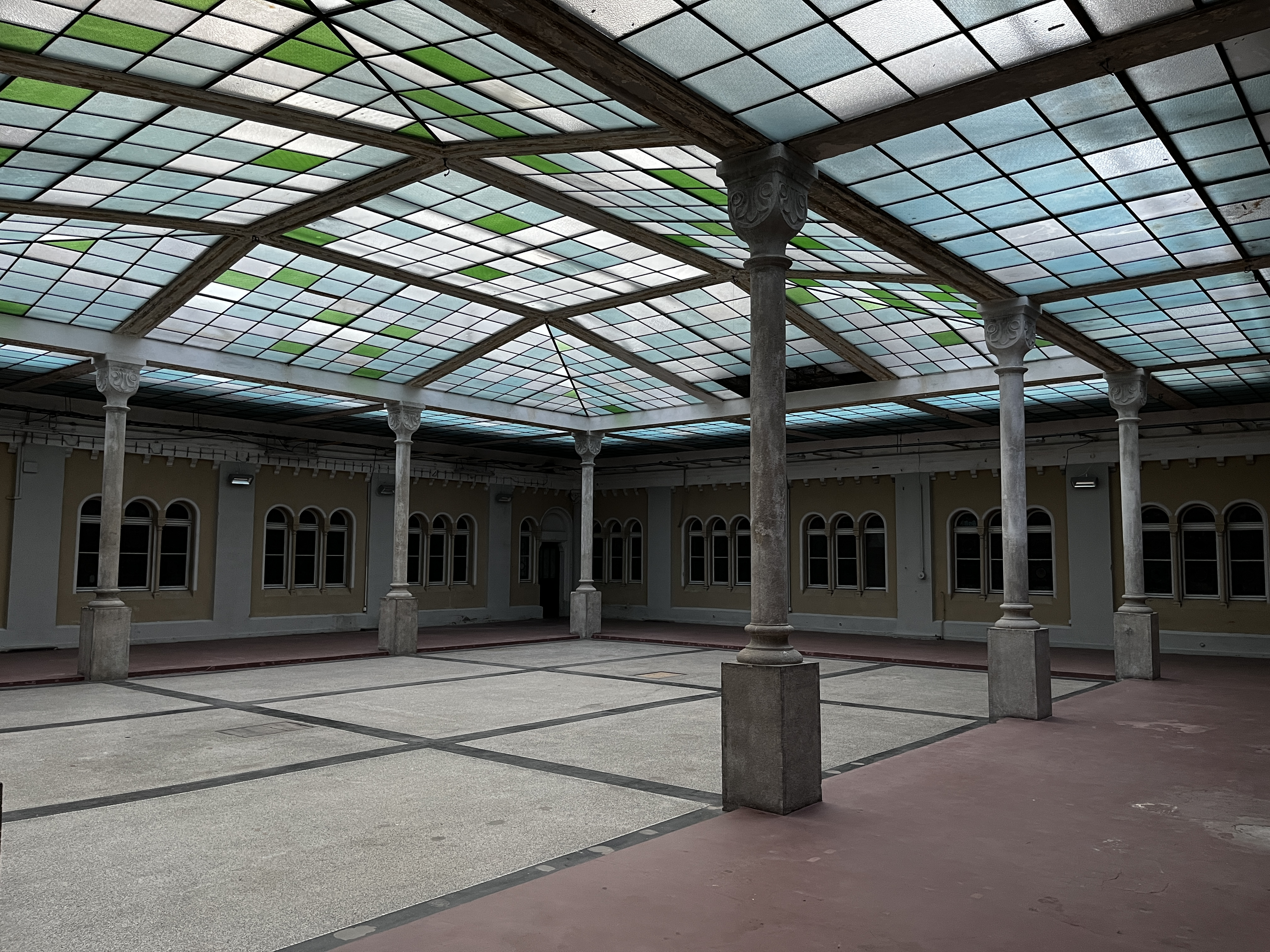
Former conservatory, later used as a postage stamp depot

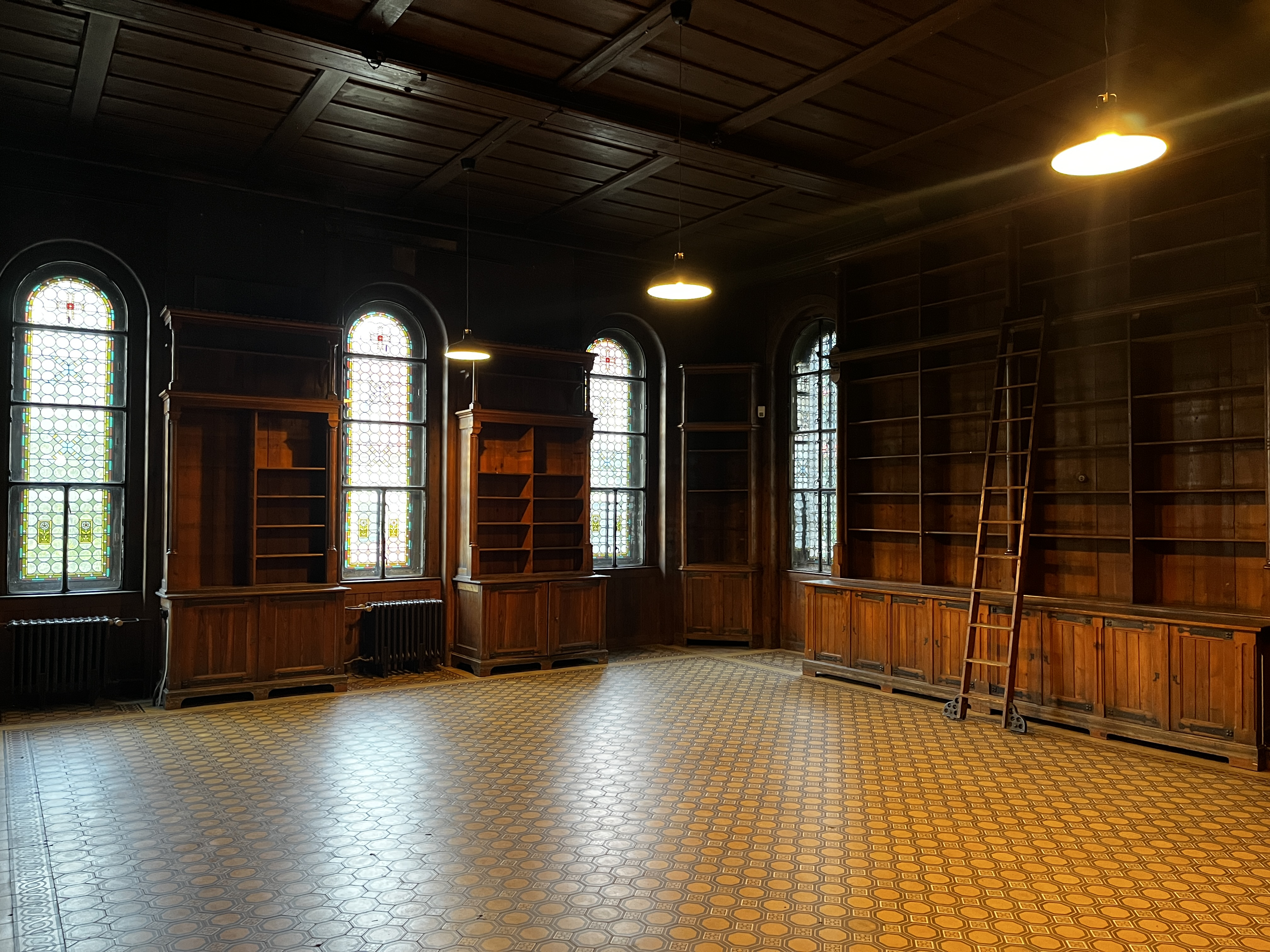
Former library

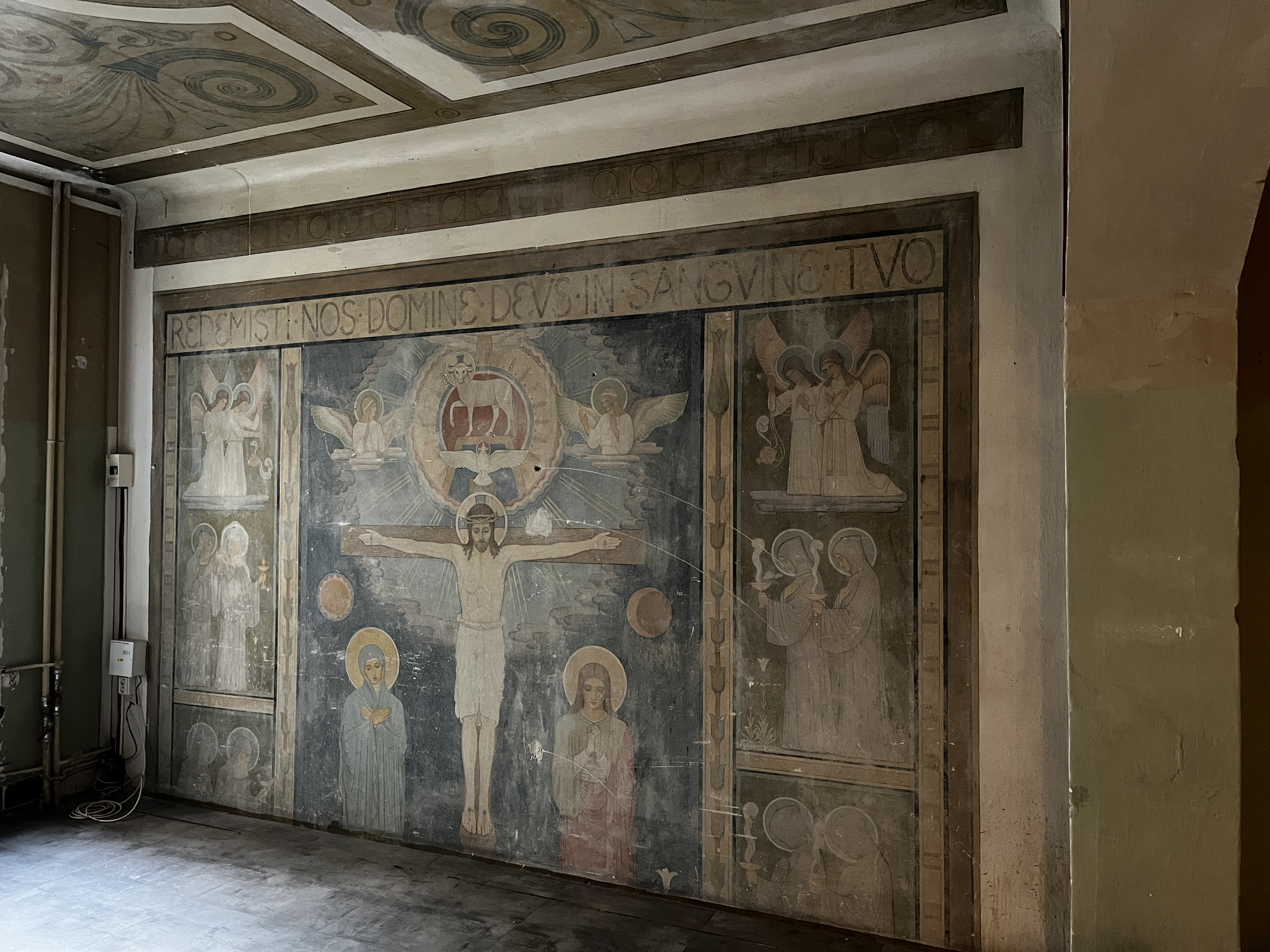
Upper part of the reredos of the former chapel, later partitioned horizontally by a mezzanine. A mainframe computer was installed across the painted mural, which is in the distinctive Beuronese style
