= Virgilia Lütz =

German Benedictine abbess (1869–1949)

Virgilia Lütz OSB
- Abbess of Nonnberg Abbey
- Elected: 1921
- Installed: 25 September 1921
- Term ended: 8 June 1949
- Predecessor: Anna Scherer
- Successor: Erentrudis Steidl

Personal details
- Born: Caroline Antonie Lütz; 27 March 1869 Sigmaringen, Hohenzollern, Kingdom of Prussia
- Died: 8 June 1949 (aged 80) Salzburg, Austria
- Denomination: Roman Catholic
- Occupation: abbess

Virgilia Lütz (born Caroline Antonie Lütz; 27 March 1869 – 8 June 1949) was a German Benedictine. She was the reigning abbess of Nonnberg in Salzburg from 1921 until her death in 1949. During her reign, Maria von Trapp entered the abbey as a postulant. Lütz is the basis for the character of the abbess in The Sound of Music and in The Trapp Family.

== Biography ==
Lütz was born in the town of Sigmaringen, Prussia and decided at a young age to enter a convent. She began her novitiate in Nonnberg Abbey on 15 October 1890 and made her first vows on 17 January 1892. During her first years in the convent, she worked as a music and language teacher in the abbey's boarding school and later became a cantor, vestment embroiderer and novice mistress. When the former abbess of Nonnberg died in 1921, Lütz was elected her successor. She was dedicated and enthroned on 25 September 1921.

One of her first decisions was to give up the Priory of Saint Hema in Gurk, which had been founded by her predecessor Anna Scherer. The community there moved to Kellenried Abbey near Ravensburg, which was built in 1924. Lütz led Nonnberg Abbey through World War II, beginning with Nazi Germany's annexation of Austria in 1938.

From January 1949, Lütz's health deteriorated; she died on 8 June 1949. Erentrudis Steidl was elected her successor on 15 July 1949.

== Portrayal in media ==
Lütz is the basis for the character of the "Mother Abbess" in the films and musicals on the life of Maria von Trapp. She was first portrayed by German actress Agnes Windeck, in the original 1956 feature-film. In the 1959 Broadway musical The Sound of Music, Lütz was portrayed by Patricia Neway, who won the Tony Award for Best Featured Actress in a Musical for her performance. The song Climb Ev'ry Mountain, written by Rodgers and Hammerstein, is sung by the Mother Abbess to Maria, encouraging her to be strong and follow her heart. In the 1965 film The Sound of Music, the Mother Abbess was portrayed by Peggy Wood.
