= Marienrode Priory =

Benedictine nunnery in Marienrode, Germany

Coordinates: 52°06′50″N 9°54′52″E

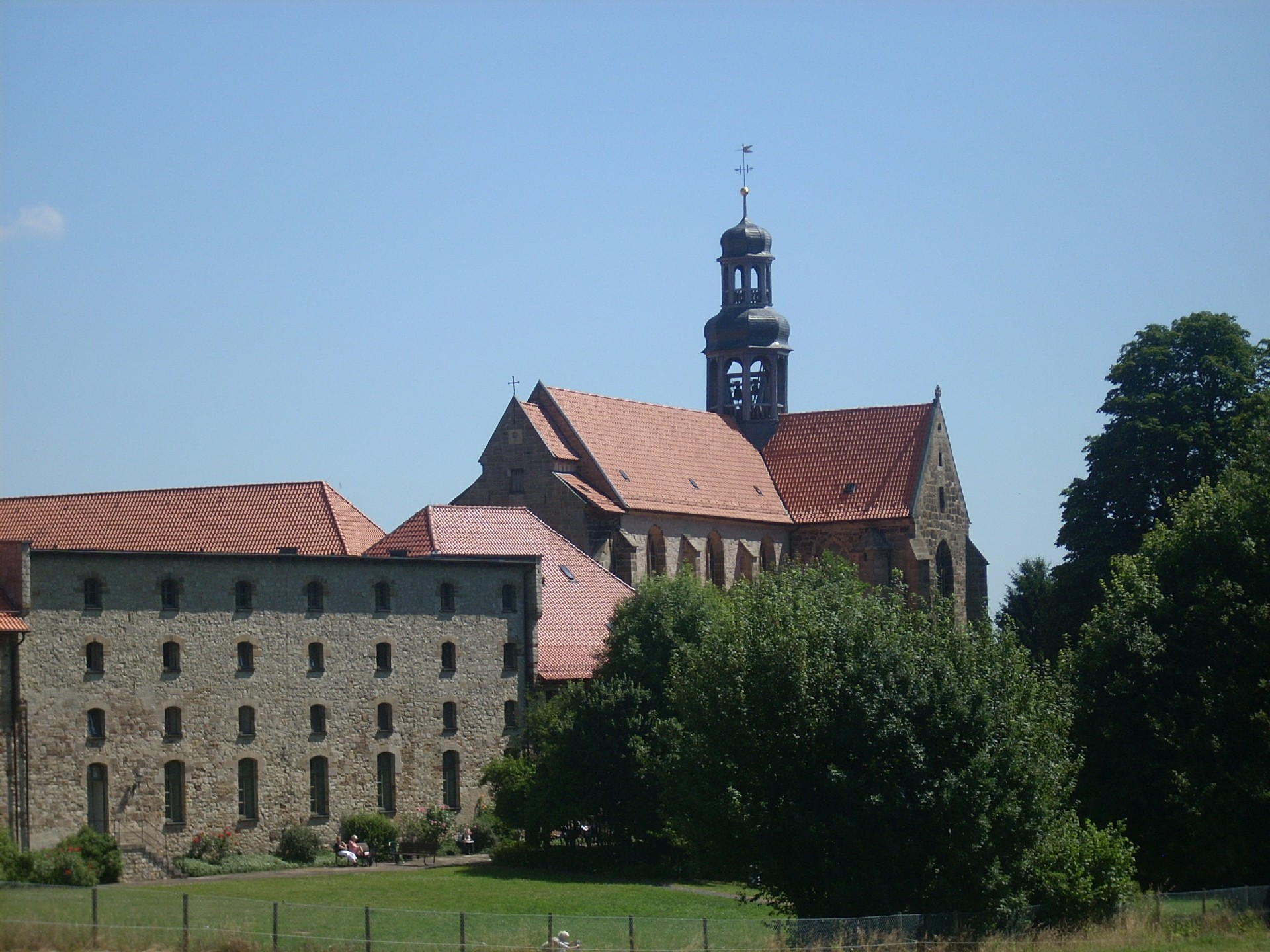
View of the priory.

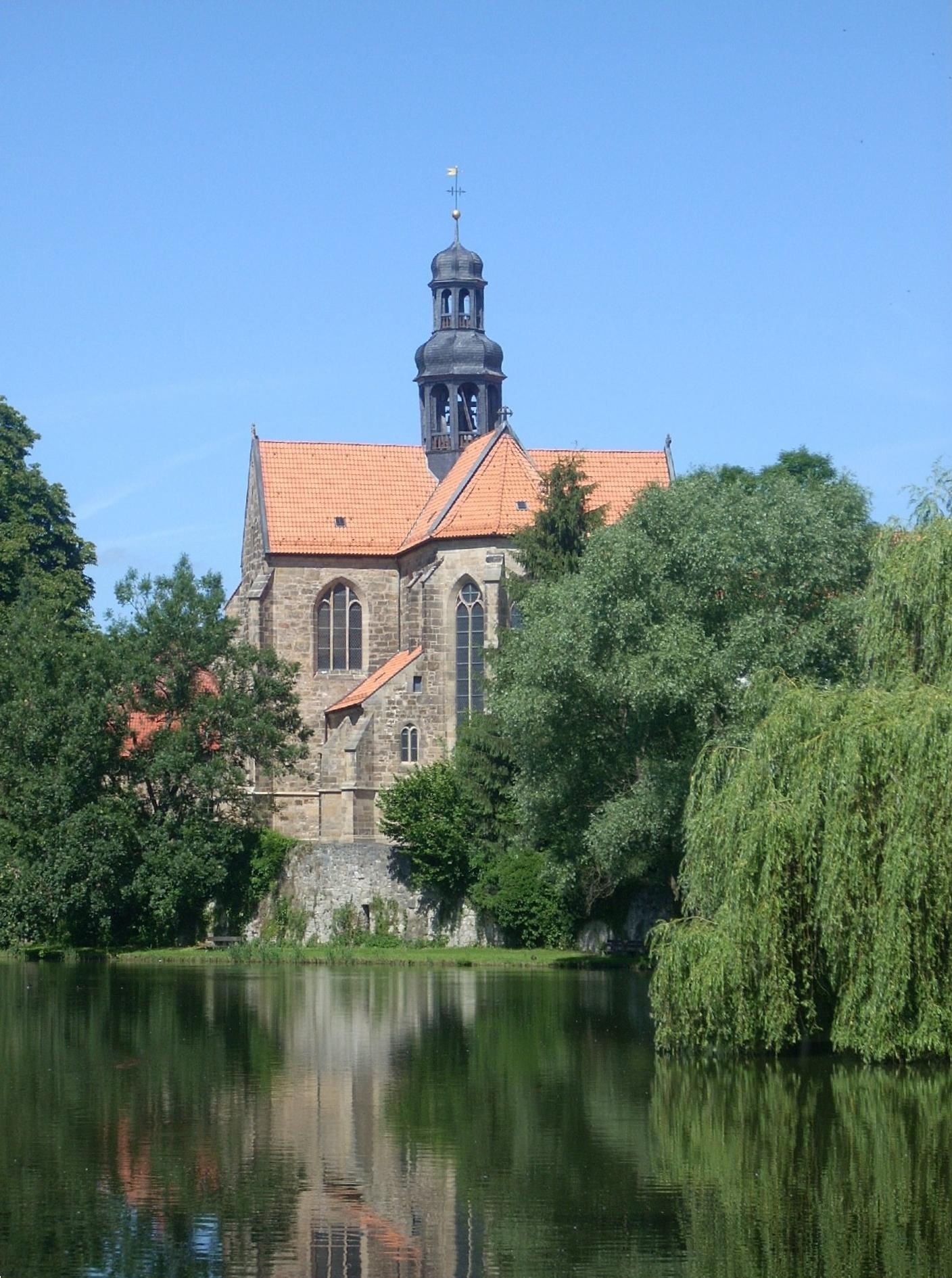
Church and fishpond.

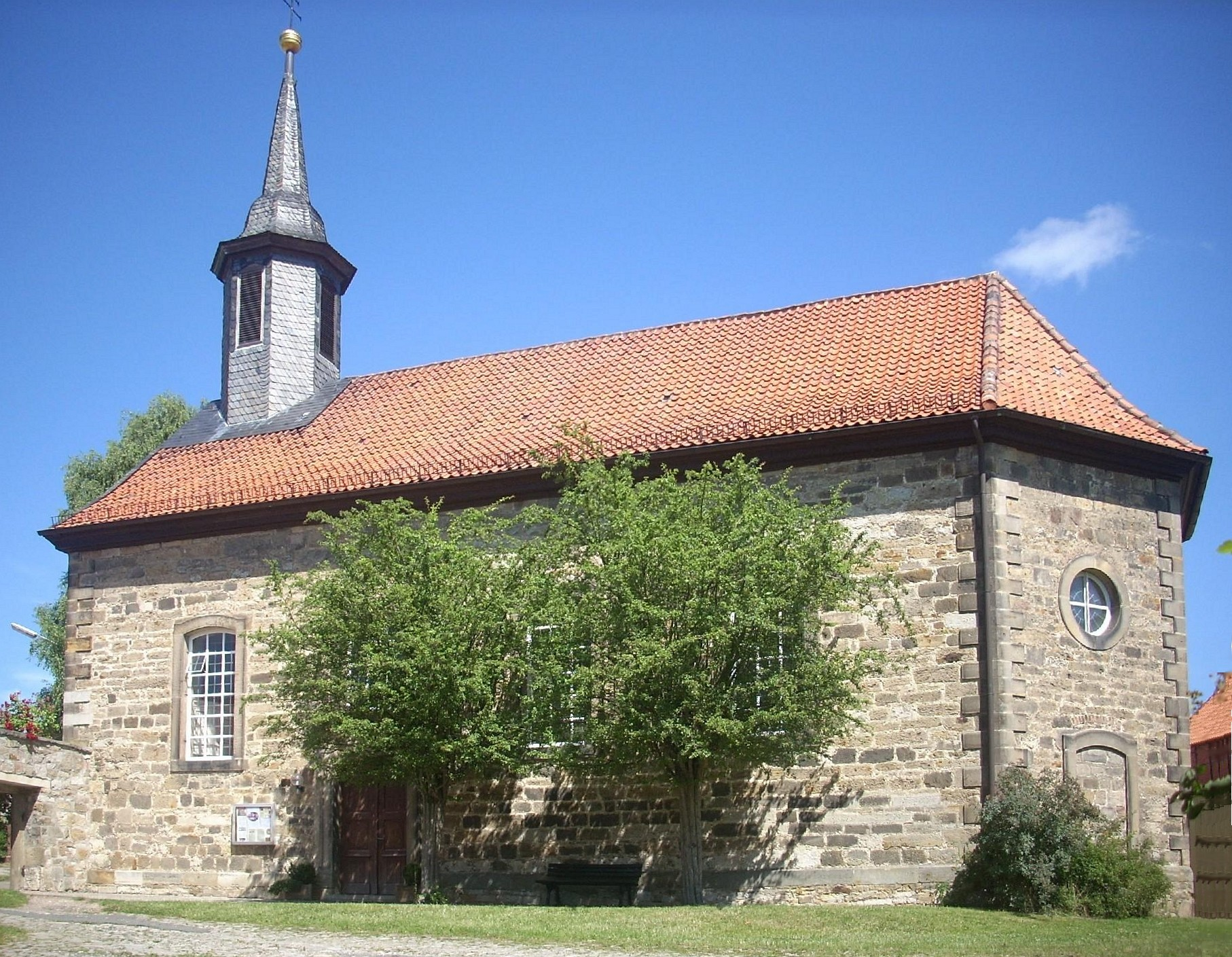
Saint Cosmas and Damian Chapel.

Marienrode Priory is a Benedictine nunnery in Marienrode, a district of Hildesheim in Germany.

An Augustinian monastery was founded here in 1125 by the Bishop of Hildesheim, Berthold I von Alvensleben, in a place then known as Baccenrode. It lasted until 1259. The site was re-settled later, at first by Augustinians and afterwards as a Cistercian monastery. The Cistercians gave the community its current name of Marienrode which has officially been used since 1439. The foundation stone of the present church was laid in 1412. The church was built in gothic style with three naves and completed in 1462. The Baroque ridge turret was added in the 18th century. In the church, there are two noteworthy baroque altars dating from 1750 approximately and a gothic sandstone sculpture of Saint Mary which was made in 1460. The organ dates from the middle of the 18th century. Most of the present buildings of the monastery consisting of sandstone were built in the 18th century. In the inner court there is a noteworthy pigeon tower. After the secularization of 1806, the monastery was used as a farm until 1987.

A small chapel of the priory, Saint Cosmas and Damian, which was built in 1792 was converted into a small Protestant church in 1830. It is not only used by the Protestants living in Marienrode, but also by those from Neuhof and Hildesheimer Wald, two districts of Hildesheim which do not have churches. The altar dates from 1835 and the organ from the end of the 18th century. According to Cistercian tradition, the chapel has a ridge turret instead of a tower.

From 1983, the new Bishop of Hildesheim, Josef Homeyer, was active in the re-establishment of monastic houses. As a result, Marienrode Priory was re-settled by ten Benedictine nuns from Eibingen Abbey on 5 May 1988. Since 1998, Marienrode has been an independent priory within the Beuronese Congregation.

Around the priory, a small village (Marienrode) developed which was incorporated into Hildesheim in 1974. The former village school which was operated by the priory was built in 1716. The windmill of Marienrode was built in 1839 and used as such until 1939. From the village it can be reached through a tree-lined avenue consisting of 200-year-old lindens, with a historic pavement. The large fishpond in the South of the village was laid out by the Cistercians in the Middle Ages.

== Sources ==
- Segers-Glocke, Christiane: Baudenkmale in Niedersachsen, Band 1.4 - Hildesheim, p. 260-269. Hameln 2007.
