= Varensell Abbey =

Abbey near Rietberg, Germany

Coordinates: 51°51′32″N 8°26′21″E

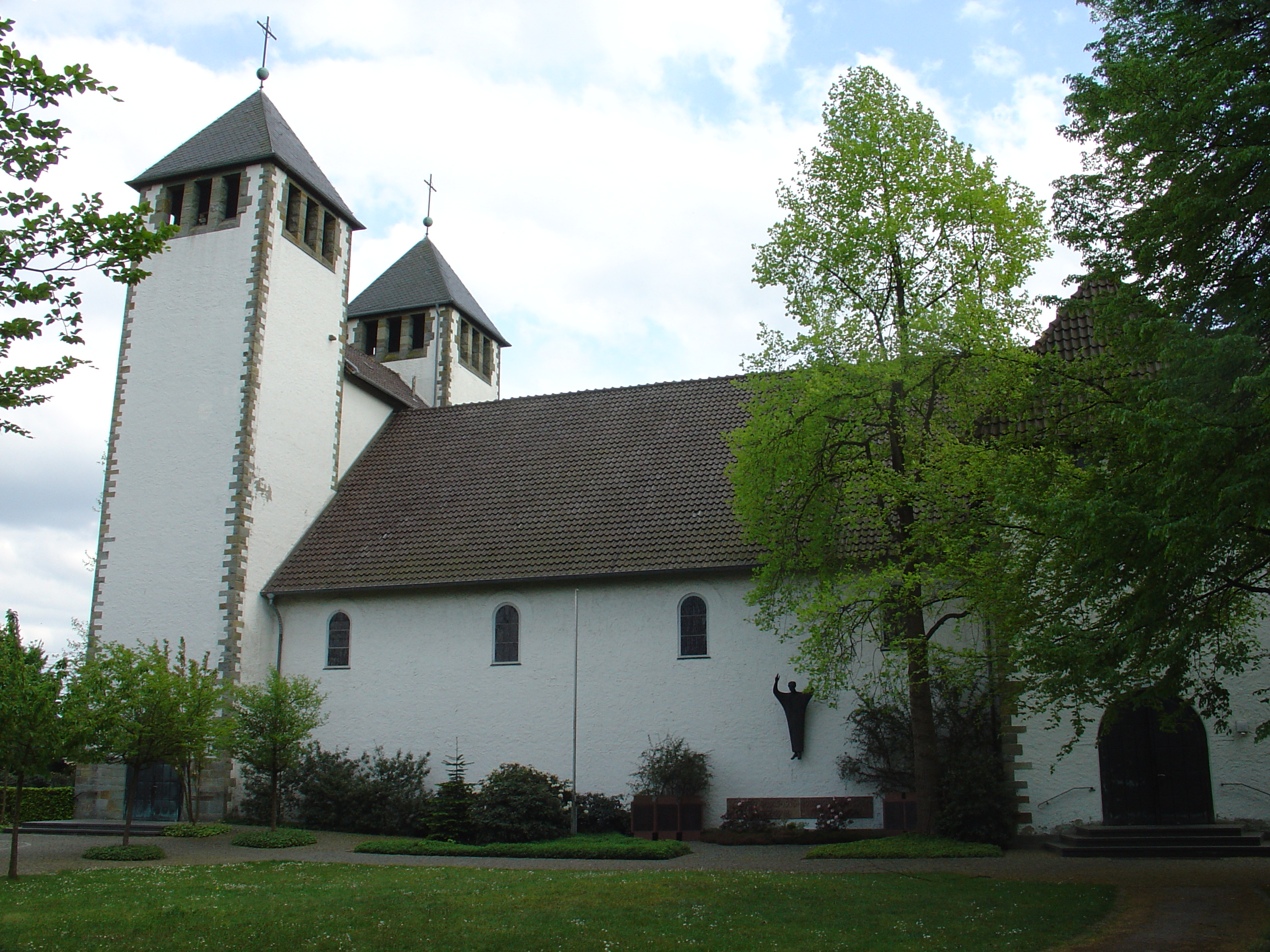
The abbey and parish church of St Mary's

Varensell Abbey (German: Abtei Varensell) is a monastic community of Benedictine nuns, located near Rietberg in the district of Gütersloh in North Rhine-Westphalia, Germany.

The monastery was founded in 1902 by the Benedictine Sisters of Perpetual Adoration within the Benedictine Confederation. Later, however, the community developed a way of life more in keeping with that of the Beuronese Congregation, which it joined in 1982. Varensell was given the status of abbey in 1948.

Besides the traditional duties of hospitality, the nuns are occupied in theological work and various handicrafts.
