= Åsebakken Priory =

Benedictine monastery in Denmark

Coordinates: 55.8567°N 12.4691°E

Åsebakken Priory, or the Priory of Our Lady of Åsebakken, is a Benedictine monastery of nuns at Birkerød, about 20 km north of Copenhagen in Denmark. The priory is part of the Beuronese Congregation within the Benedictine Confederation.

== History ==
In 1898, the Apostolic Vicar of Denmark, Johannes von Euch, approached the monastery of the Sisters of Perpetual Adoration in Innsbruck, Austria, with the invitation to establish a monastic community in his prelature. During 1902-3, with the financial backing of Baroness Maria von Wacken Hartig, the Sisters acquired two parcels of land in Copenhagen. Construction on them, however, was not begun until 1913, and lasted into the following year.

In June 1914, a group of seven Sisters left Austria under the leadership of Prioress M. Birgitta von Wacken Hartig, and the monastery was formally established on the following 8 October. That same day, two Danish women were received as postulants to the community. Within a few years, the community numbered over twenty Sisters.

In 1935 the Sisters were led in a spiritual retreat under Father Watler Czernin, O.S.B., a monk of Beuron Abbey in Germany. Through this exercise, the decision was made by the community to put themselves under the Rule of St. Benedict. The entire community began their canonical novitiate on 24 October 1936. They made their profession of religious vows as Benedictine nuns on 8 December of the following year.

The monastery moved to its present location, a former country house, in 1942. Although the Beuronese Constitution was adopted in 1936, formal incorporation into the Beuronese Congregation was completed only in 1988.

Under Czernin's leadership, in 1948 one of the nuns helped to found a monastery in Brazil, the Mosteiro de São João in São Paulo.
