= Kellenried Abbey =

Benedictine abbey in Baden-Württemberg, Germany

Coordinates: 47°50′37″N 9°34′11″E

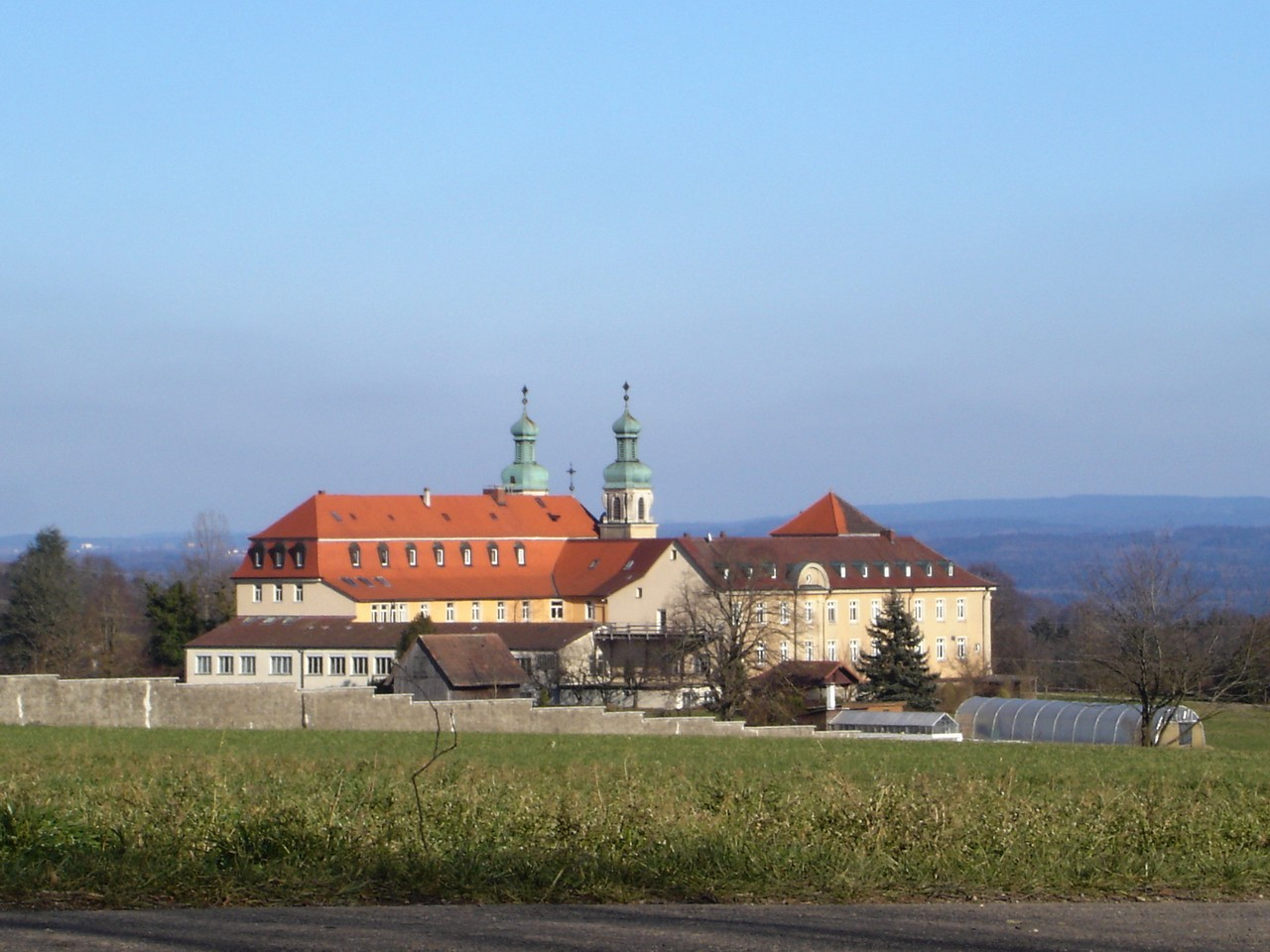
Kellenried Abbey

St. Erentraud's Abbey, Kellenried, otherwise Kellenried Abbey, is a Benedictine nunnery in Kellenried. The abbey belongs to the town of Berg in Baden-Württemberg, Germany.

The nunnery was founded by the Beuronese Congregation in 1924. The first nuns came from St. Hemma's Abbey in Gurk, Carinthia, and from St. Gabriel's Abbey in Schloss Bertholdstein. The abbey was named after St. Erentraud of Salzburg, first abbess of Nonnberg Abbey in Salzburg.

The abbey church was built by Adolf J. Lorenz in 1923–24 in the Baroque Revival style. In 1926 the monastery was raised to the status of an abbey. In 1940 the nuns were expelled from the premises by the National Socialists, but returned in 1945.

The abbey owns a Baroque nativity scene, the oldest figure of which is from the 17th century, that is displayed annually from Christmas until 2 February.

Apart from the traditional duties of hospitality, the nuns engage in various crafts and also run a shop in Kellenried where they sell nativity figures and hand-made candles.
