= Emmanuel von Severus =

Austrian Benedictine monk

Emmanuel von Severus OSB (24 August 1908, Vienna - 24 July 1997, Andernach) was an Austrian Benedictine.

== Life ==
Born as Rudolf von Severus, was the son of a lieutenant field marshal in the Austro-Hungarian Army.

After finishing high school, he entered Maria Laach Abbey in 1928 to study theology. He was ordained a priest on 5 August 1934 and after studying Latin and history he gained his philosophy doctorate at Pater Emmanuel in 1939.

During WWII, he was drafted into the Wehrmacht as a medic and served in the Balkans, returning to Maria Laach in 1945.

From 1948 to 1990 (apart from brief interruptions) he was novice master at Maria Laach under three abbots. From 1958 to 1978 he managed the Liturgical Archive (Archiv für Liturgiewissenschaft). He also lectured on spiritual issues and wrote on scientific and spiritual topics.
