= Engelthal Abbey =

Abbey in Hesse, Germany

Coordinates: 50°16′57″N 8°54′47″E

Engelthal Abbey or St. Mary's Abbey, Engelthal, (German: Kloster Engelthal; Latin: Abbatia B.M.V. in Valle Angelorum) is a Benedictine nunnery in the Wetterau region, Hesse, Germany.

Engelthal Abbey was a Cistercian nunnery from its foundation in 1268, until the secularisation of 1803, when it passed into the possession of the Imperial Counts of Leiningen-Westerburg-Neuleiningen and later in the 19th century was sold to the Counts of Solms-Wildenfels.

In 1962 it was re-settled by the Benedictine nuns of Herstelle Abbey. The house was raised to the status of abbey in 1965, and belongs to the Beuronese Congregation of the Benedictine Confederation.

Besides the normal Benedictine duty of hospitality, the nuns of Engelthal are also involved in the restoration of ecclesiastical works of art.
