= St. Mary's Abbey, Fulda =

Benedictine monastery of nuns in Hesse, Germany

Coordinates: 50°33′11″N 9°40′38″E

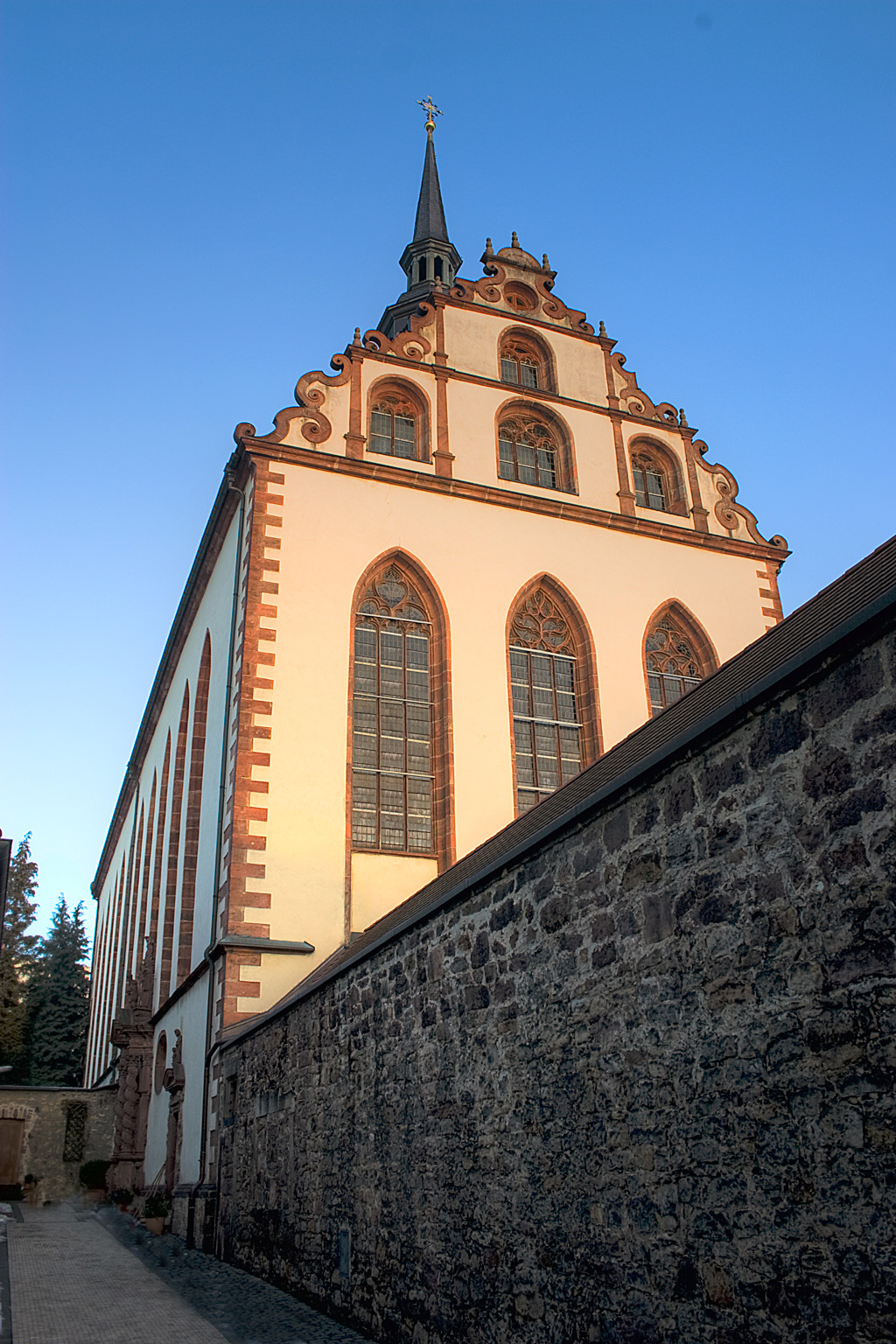
St. Mary's Abbey

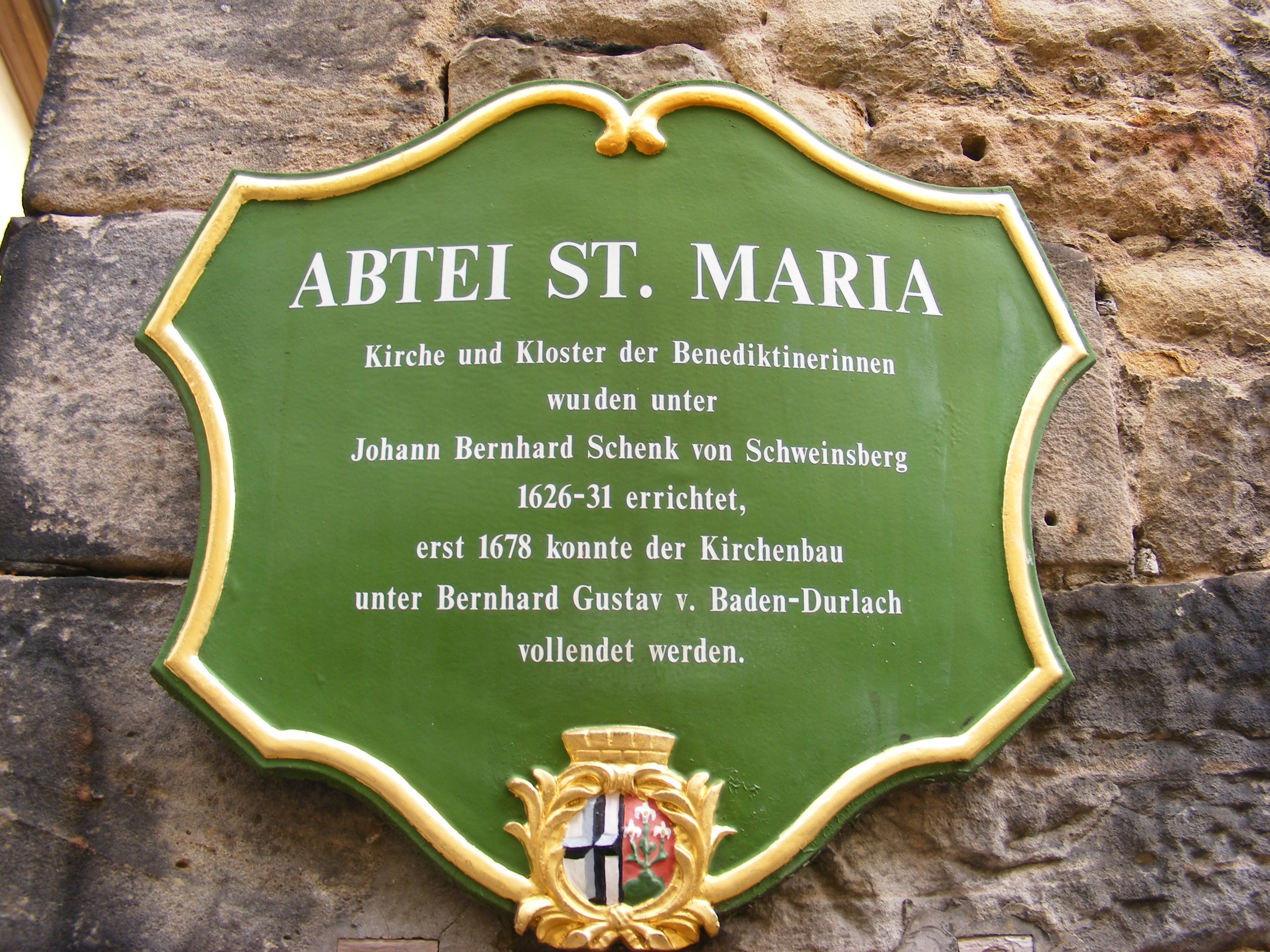
sign

St. Mary's Abbey is a Benedictine nunnery in Fulda, Hesse, Germany.

St. Mary's Abbey was founded in 1626. The first decades were very troubled as a result of the Thirty Years' War: the sisters often had to flee from enemy troops and the abbey was looted several times.

The nunnery was able to evade destruction during the secularization of 1802 by turning itself into a girls' school. During the Kulturkampf, the sisters went into exile in France from 1875 to 1887. In 1898, the nunnery was elevated to the status of abbey. In 1942, although most religious houses in Germany were commandeered by the National Socialists, the nuns were able to avoid eviction by offering the use of most of the premises to the Wehrmacht.

After becoming closer in their way of life over a period of many years to the Beuronese Congregation within the Benedictine Confederation, the abbey finally became a member in 1982.

The nuns engage in various handicrafts, run the abbey shop and have built a compost activator.
