= Beuronese Congregation =

Congregation within the Benedictine Confederation

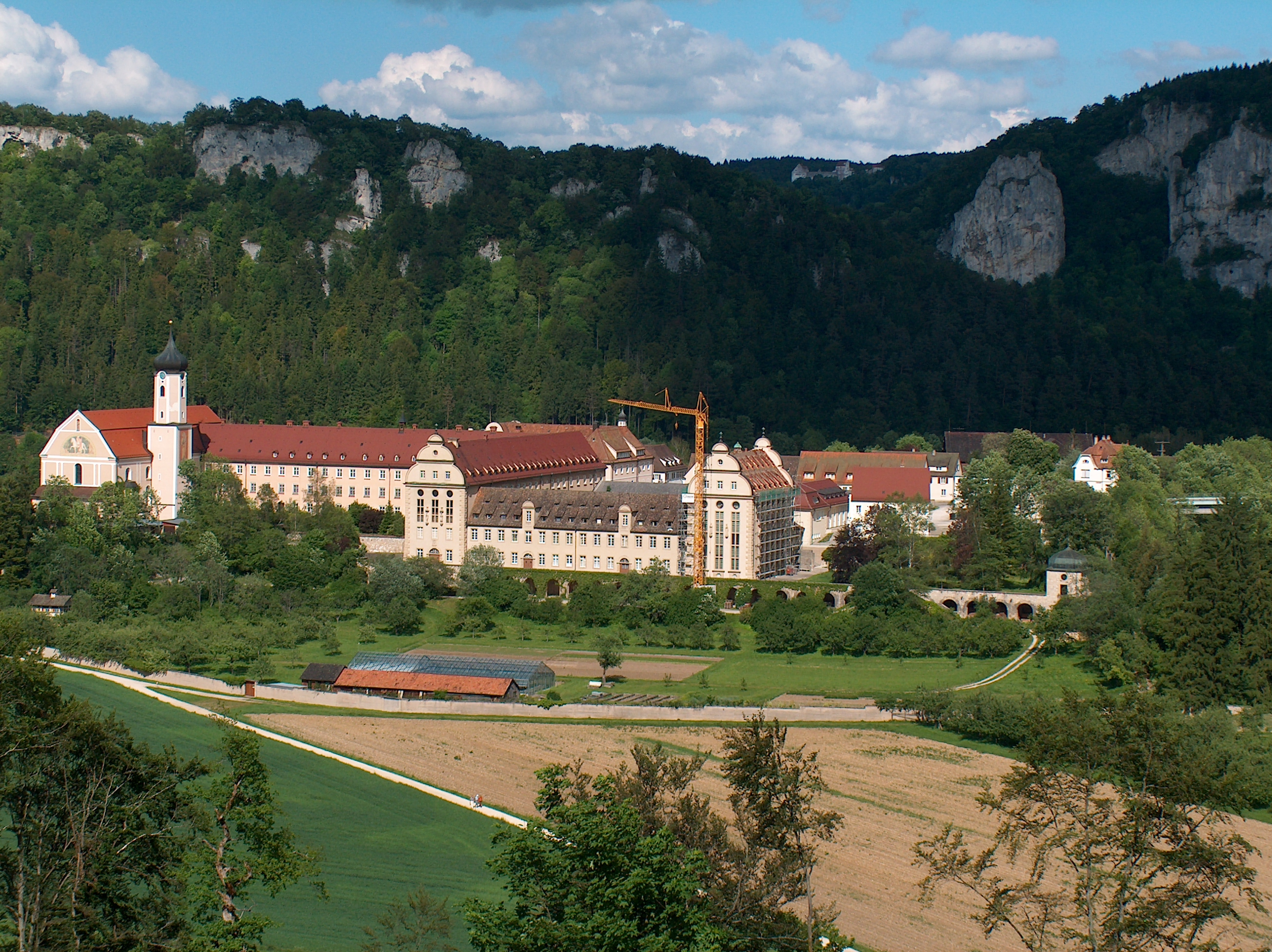
- Archabbey of Beuron
- Abbreviation: OSB
- Formation: c. AD 1863; 163 years ago
- Founder: Frs. Placidus and Maurus Wolter
- Type: Catholic religious order
- Headquarters: Belgium
- Website: osbatlas.com

The Beuronese Congregation, also known as Beuron Congregation, is a union of mostly German or German-speaking monasteries of both monks and nuns within the Benedictine Confederation. The congregation is under the patronage of Martin of Tours, the patron saint of the Archabbey of Beuron.

== History ==
The origin of the Beuron Congregation begins with the Archabbey of St. Martin, Beuron, founded in 1863, the first declarations of which in 1866 already had in view an expansion to a congregation. After a further foundation, that of Maredsous Abbey in Belgium, the first constitutions of the Beuronese Congregation were ratified in Rome in 1873.

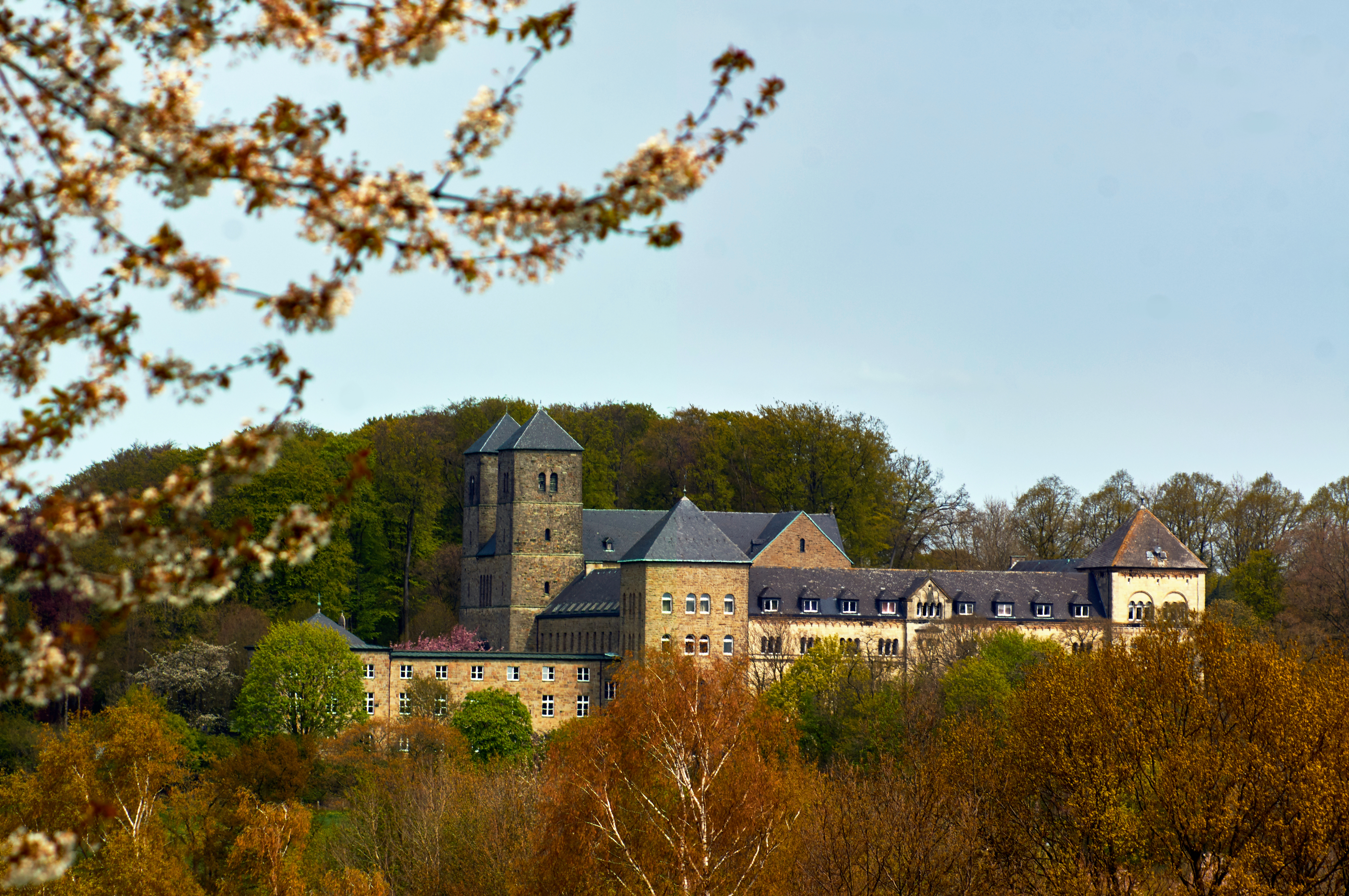
Gerleve Abbey

Further foundations outside Germany followed during the period of "cultural struggle" (Kulturkampf), when the community was driven out of Beuron. Most relocated to an old Servite monastery in Volders in the Austrian Tyrol. In 1876, some of the monks were given refuge in Erdington Abbey, Birmingham, England until after the First World War. After their return it was possible to found more monasteries inside Germany: Maria Laach Abbey (1893); Gerleve Abbey (1904); Neresheim Abbey (1920); Weingarten Abbey (1922); Neuburg Abbey (1926); and others. The last foundations were Tholey Abbey, resettled in 1949, and Nütschau Priory, a new foundation established by Gerleve Abbey in 1951.

The congregation also continued to be active outside Germany, in among other places Belgium, Austria, Portugal, Brazil and Japan; in 1906 the Abbey of the Dormition (or Assumption) (now Hagia Maria Sion Abbey) in Jerusalem was founded.

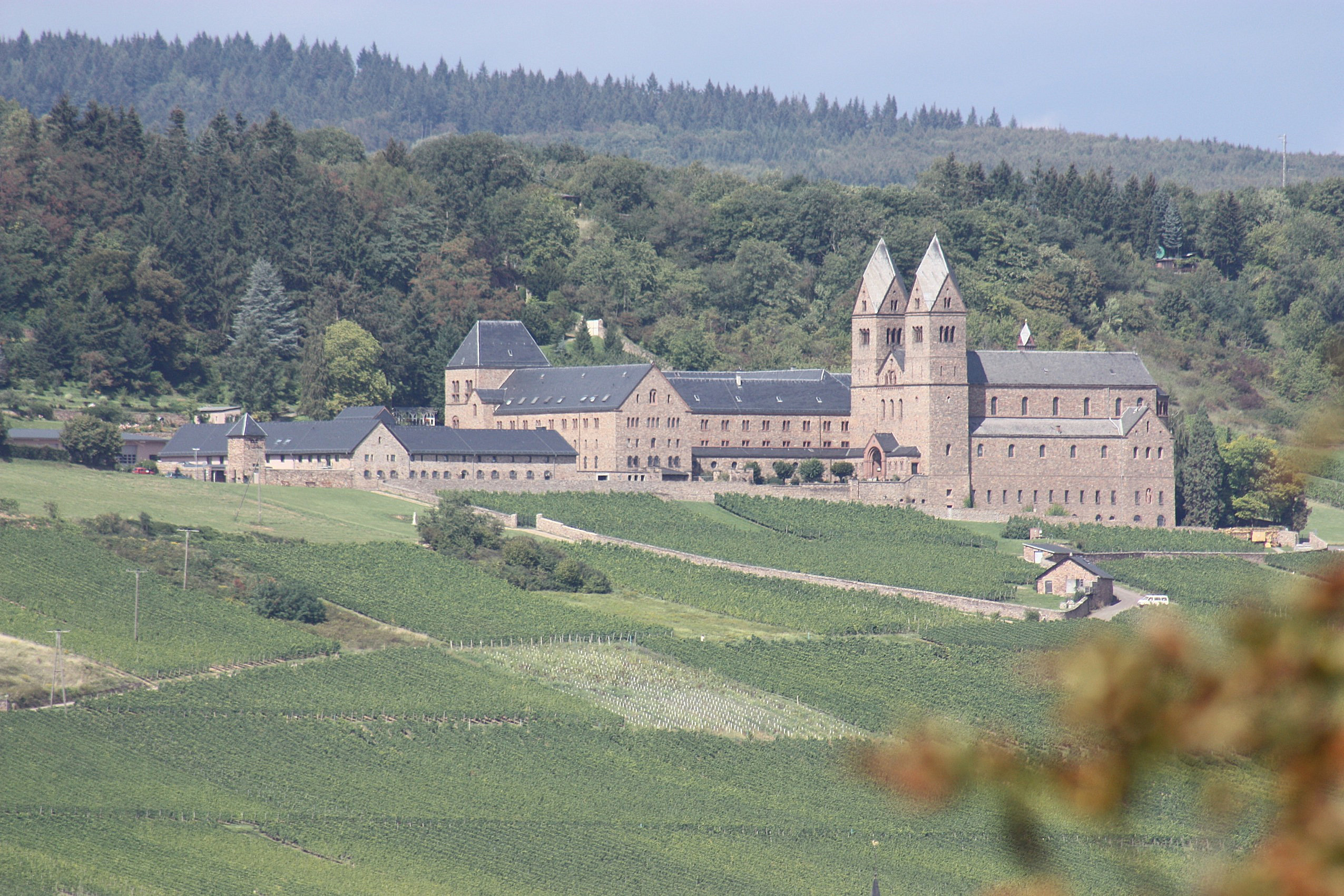
Eibingen Abbey

The congregation's first nunnery was St. Gabriel's Priory, later elevated to St. Gabriel's Abbey, established at Smíchov in Prague in 1889, which relocated in 1919–20 to Schloss Bertholdstein in Pertlstein in Styria. This was followed in 1893 by Maredret Abbey in Belgium, then in 1904 by St. Hildegard's Abbey, Eibingen and in 1924 St. Erentraud's Abbey, Kellenried. More recent foundations are Engelthal Abbey (1965) and Marienrode Priory (1988). Other nunneries were taken into the congregation as already existing communities.

The Congregation generously help fund the College of Sant'Anselmo, founded in 1887, and the Pontifical Athenaeum of Saint Anselm, established in 1888, both located at Sant'Anselmo all'Aventino in Rome. At the request of Pope Leo XIII in 1895, they also assisted in the revival of the Brazilian Congregation.

During World War II, a number of refugee monks of the Beuronese Congregation, established a temporary priory in Keyport, New Jersey with the help of St. Mary's Abbey in Morristown. It was closed in 1948.

== Organization ==
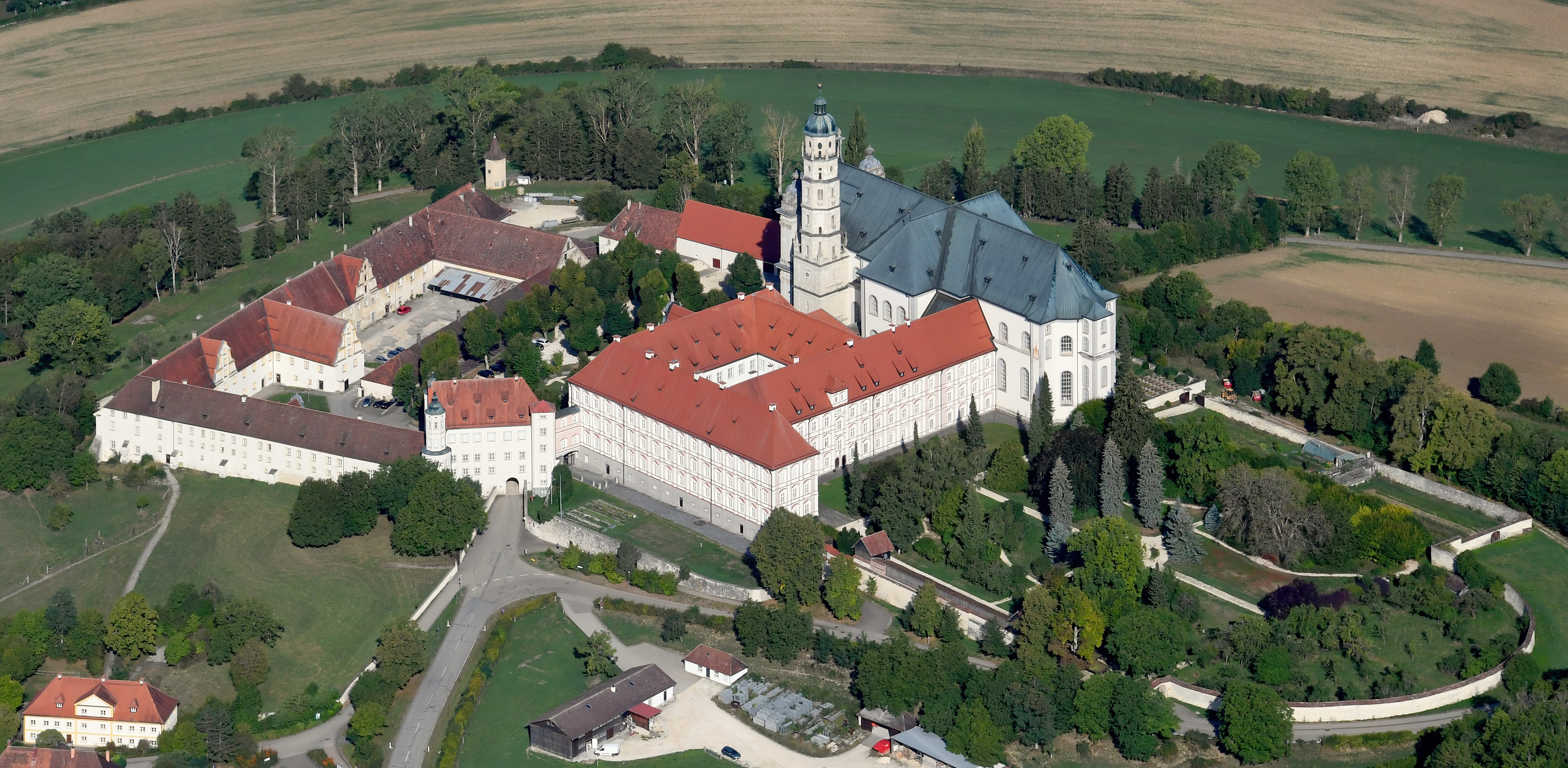
Neresheim Abbey

Initially, the congregation was under the management of the Abbot of Beuron, who acted as its Archabbot. The General Chapter, which took place at lengthy intervals and was attended by the congregation's officiating abbots, served the purpose of promoting general agreement among the communities and the regulation of outstanding questions. It was a strongly centralised system: all houses of the congregation were obliged to follow the customs, daily routine, service times and forms prescribed by Beuron.

In 1936 the Archabbot system was replaced by that of the Presiding Abbot; the General Chapter, which as a rule assembles every six years, elects one of the officiating abbots of the congregation as Presiding Abbot until the time of the next chapter meeting. This makes the congregation more federalistic, and individual monasteries and nunneries are better able to develop an individual profile.

In 1984, in accordance with the Codex Iuris Canonici of 1983, the revised statutes of the congregation and the declarations for monasteries and nunneries were approved. The statutes identify as tasks of the congregation the furtherance of the observation of the rule in the member houses, mutual help and joint solutions to tasks and problems, as well as exchanges between monasteries and nunneries. The General Chapter, consisting of the heads of each religious house, as well as elected representatives, is to meet every six years. Since 2003 the representatives of women's communities have had full voting rights.

The foundations outside Germany and Austria later separated from the Beuronese Congregation, often for political reasons. In 1920, Maredsous Abbey became a founding member of the Congregation of the Annunciation. Maredret Abbey is also affiliated with the Congregation of the Annunciation. After the monks returned from Erdington Abbey, they founded in 1922 St. Martin's Abbey, in Weingarten. The Birmingham parish was turned over to the Redemptorists; the former abbey is now Highclare School. After repeated wartime internments of the monks, in 1951, Dormition Abbey was separated from the Beuron Congregation and placed under the direct supervision of the Abbot-Primate of the Benedictines in Rome. In 2007 the nuns of St. Gabriel's Priory left the Beuronese Congregation and joined the Federation of Sisters of St. Lioba.

== Archabbots ==
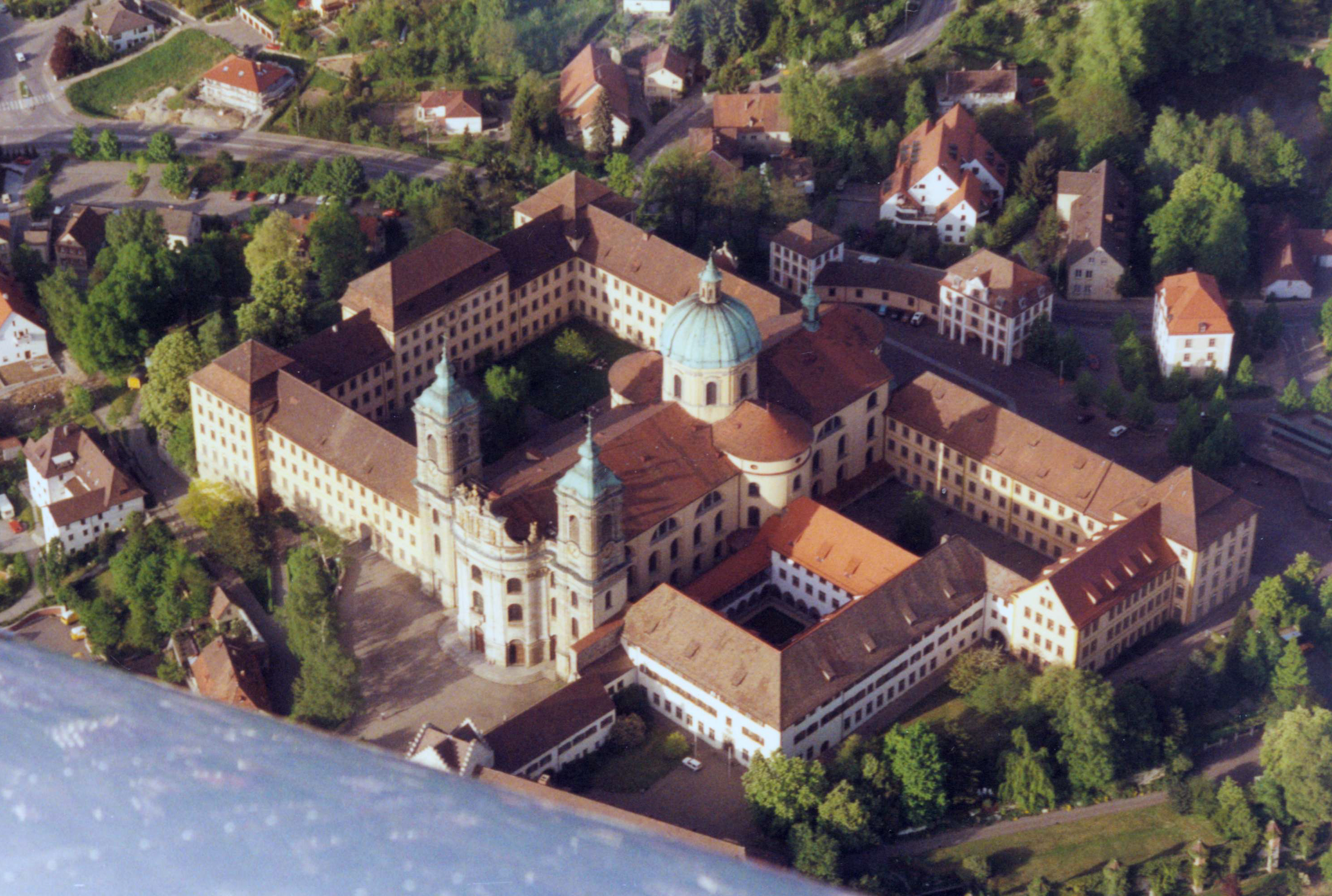
Weingarten Kloster

- Maurus Wolter (1873–1890)
- Placidus Wolter (1890–1908)
- Idelfons Schober (1908–1914)
- Raphael Walzer (1918–1922)

=== Presidents ===
- Raphael Molitor (1922–
- Albert Schmidt (2008–2021)
- Franziskus Berzdorf (2021–present)

== Monasteries ==
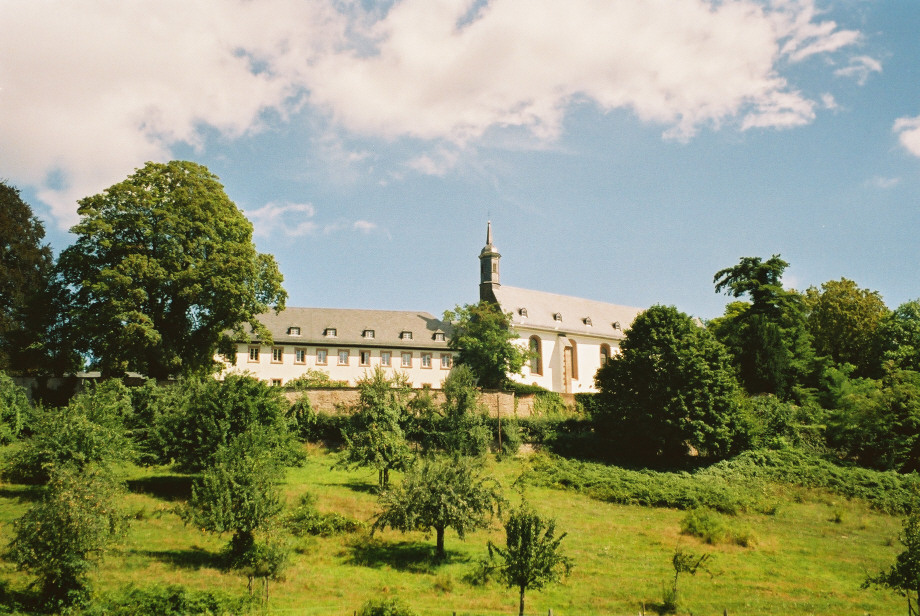
Abtei Neuburg

1. St. Martin's Archabbey, Beuron
2. Abbey of Our Dear Lady, Seckau, Styria
3. Maria Laach Abbey
4. St. Martin's Abbey, Weingarten
5. St. Joseph's Abbey, Gerleve
6. Abbey of Saints Ulrich and Afra, Neresheim
7. Abbey of the "House of Grace of Maria at Grüssau", Wimpfen
8. St. Bartholomew's Abbey, Neuburg
9. St. Maurice's Abbey, Tholey
10. St. Ansgar's Priory, Nütschau

== Nunneries ==
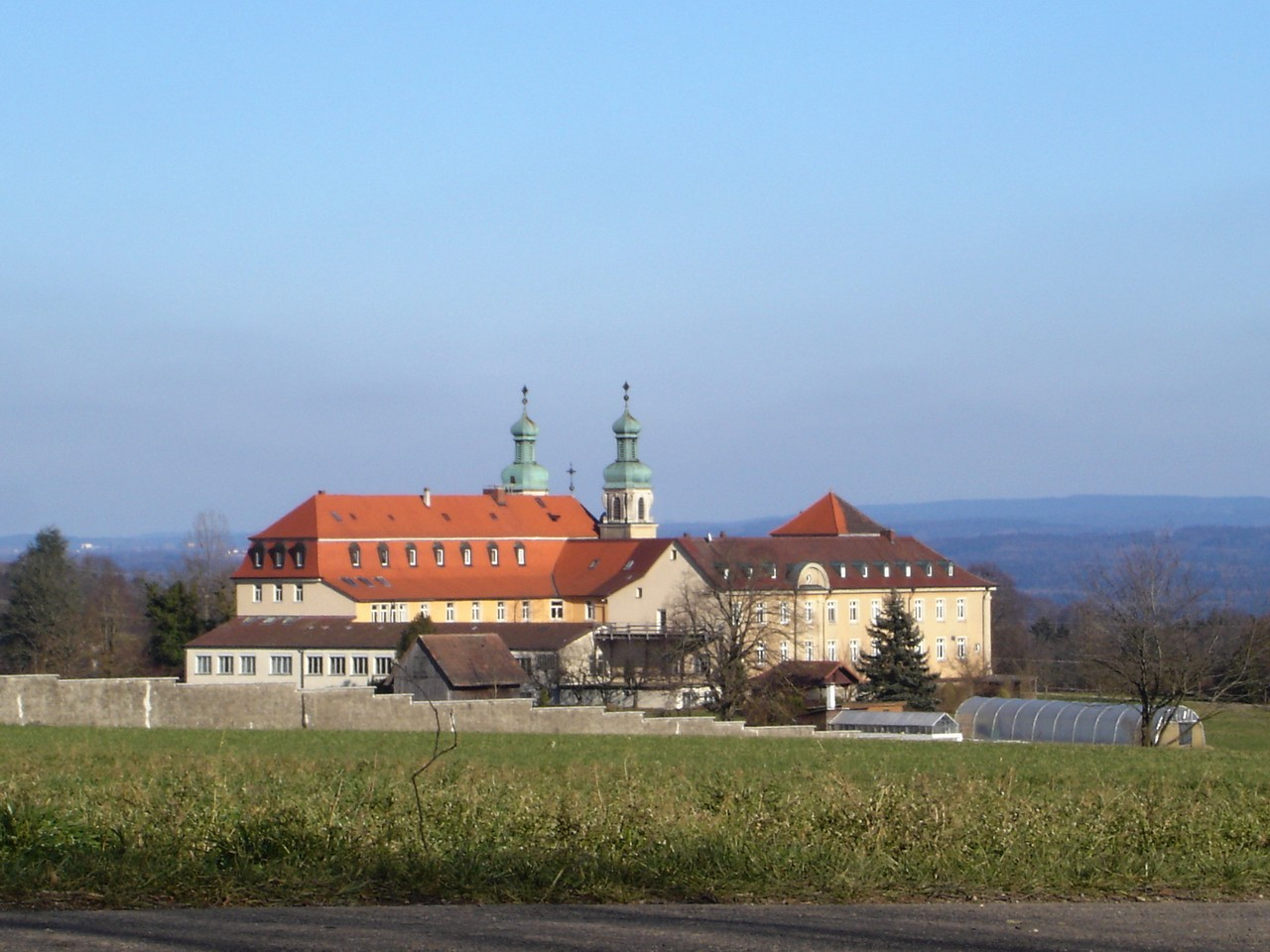
Abbey of St. Erentraud, Kellenried

1. St. Hildegard's Abbey, Eibingen
2. Abbey of the Holy Cross, Herstelle
3. St. Erentraud's Abbey, Kellenried
4. St. Mary's Abbey, Engelthal
5. Abbey of the Holy Cross, Säben, South Tyrol, Italy
6. Abbey of Our Dear Lady, Varensell
7. St. Mary's Abbey, Fulda
8. Marienrode Priory
9. Priory of Our Lady, Åsebakken, Denmark
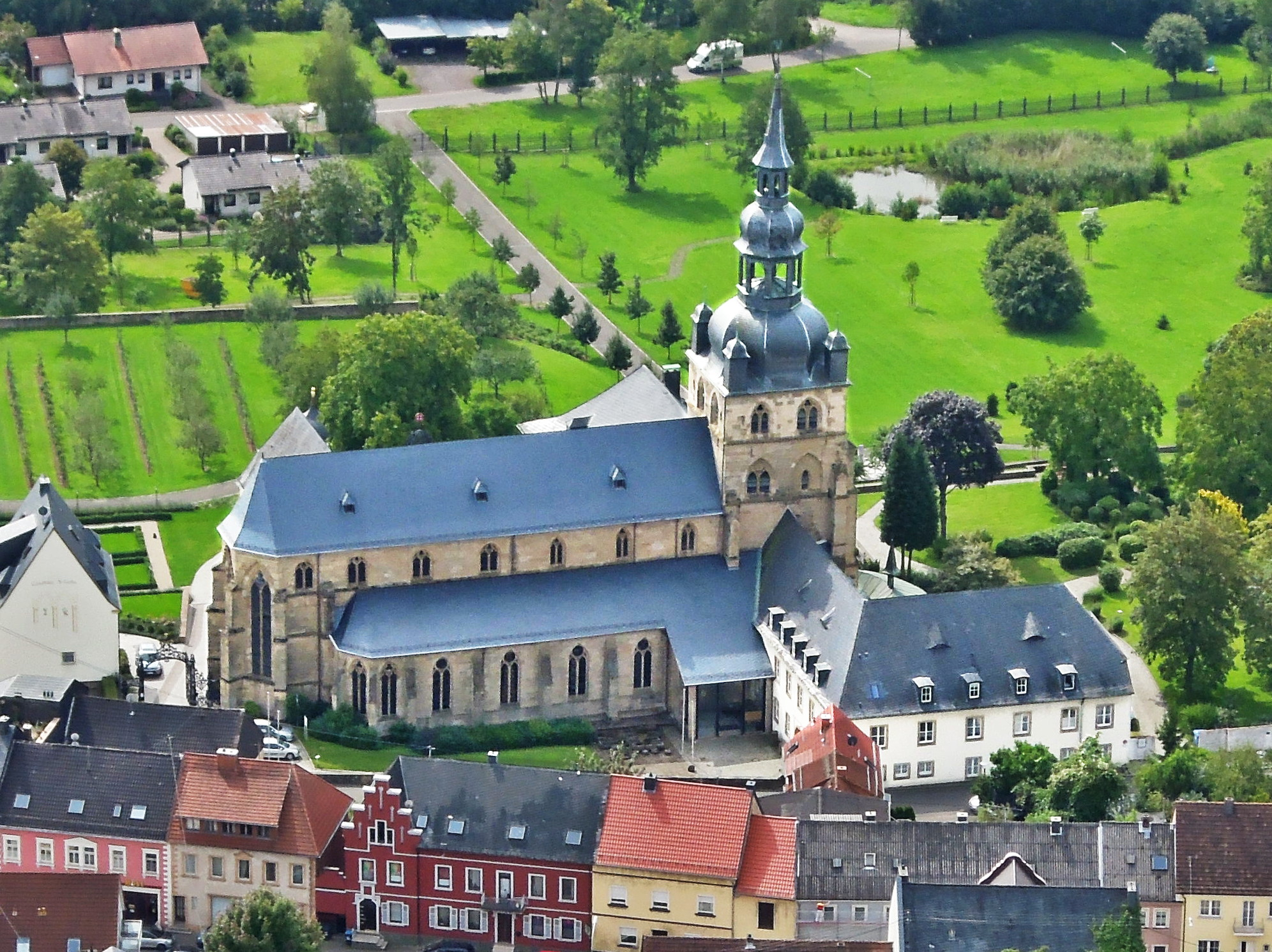
Tholey Abbey

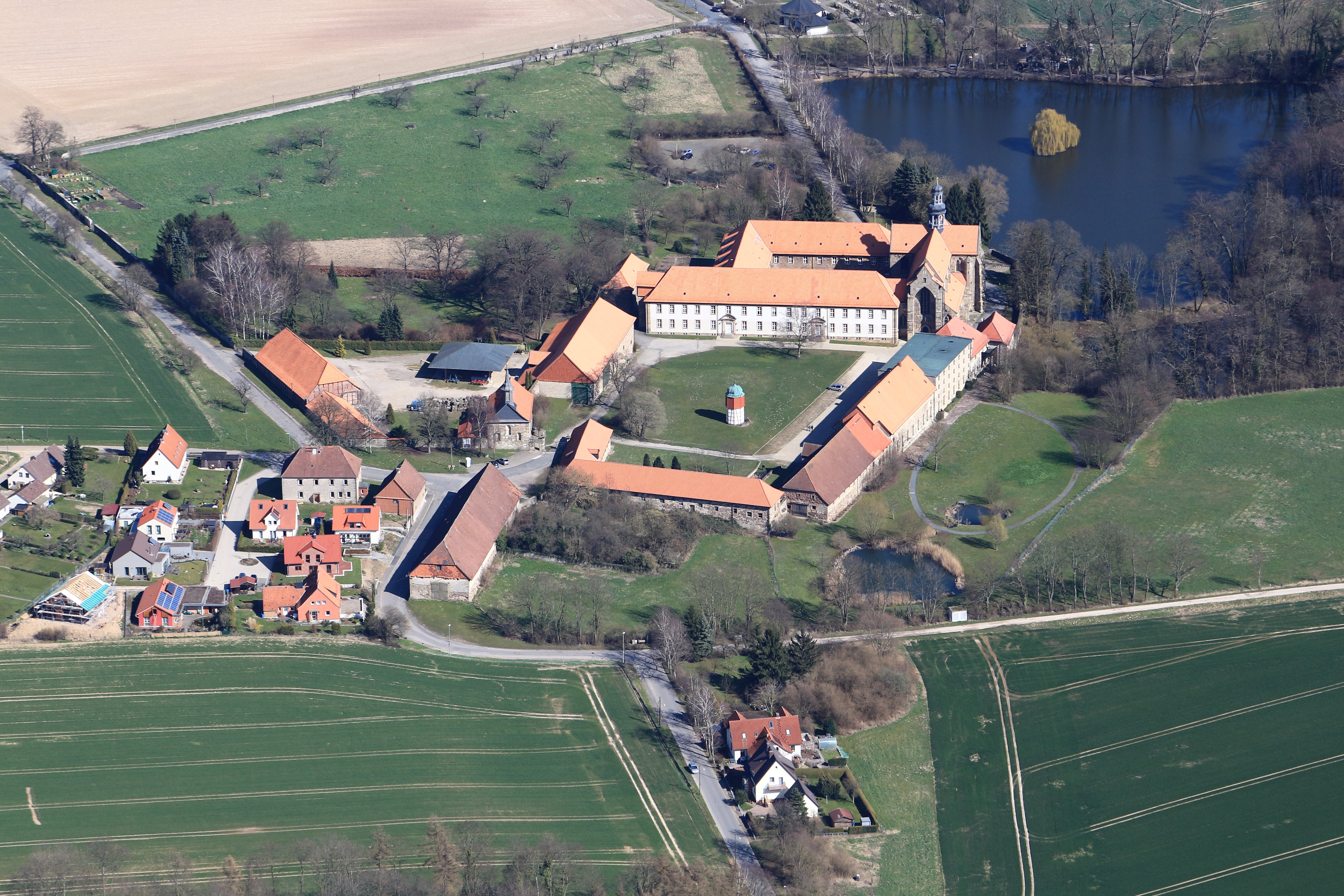
Marienrode priory

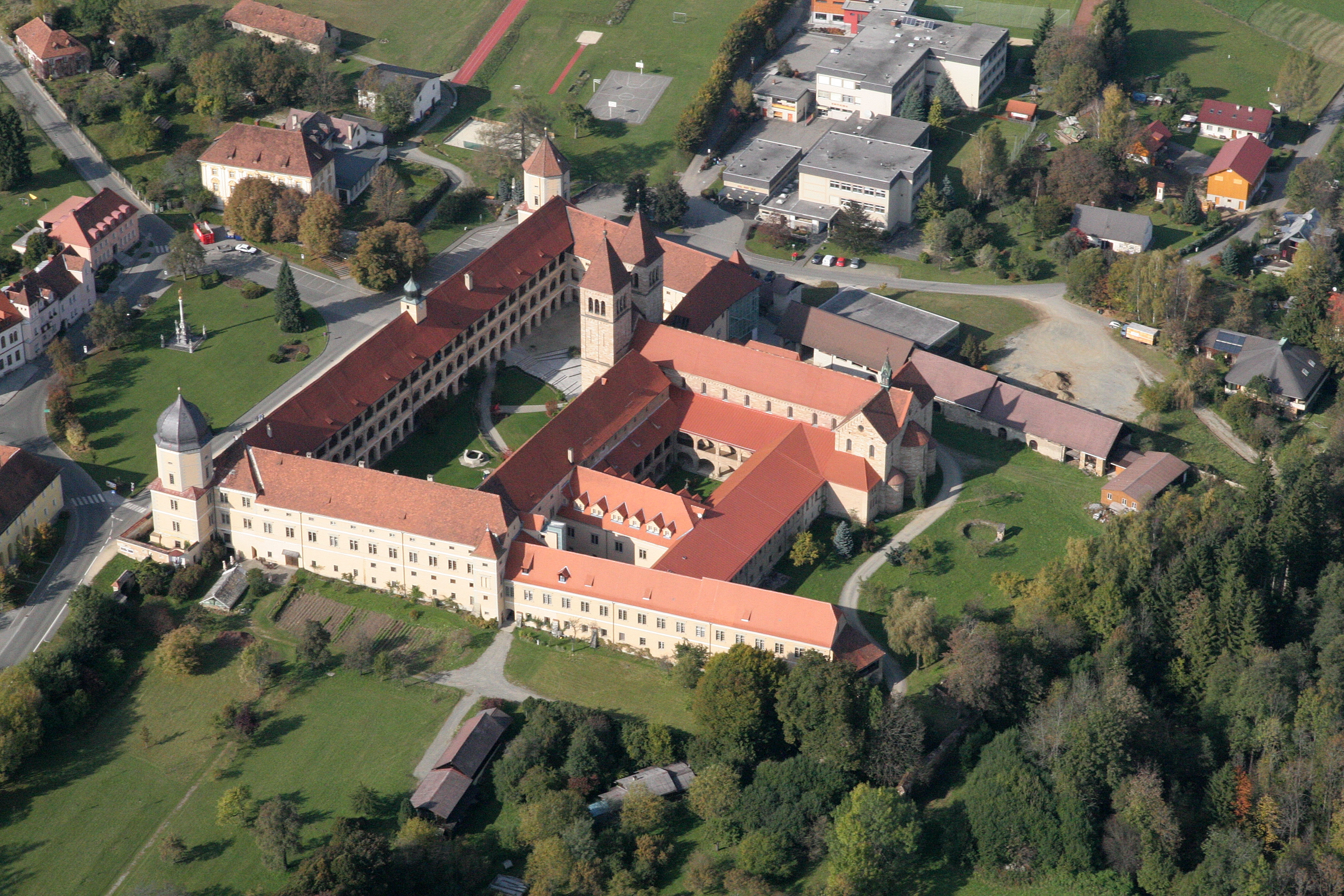
Seckau Abbey

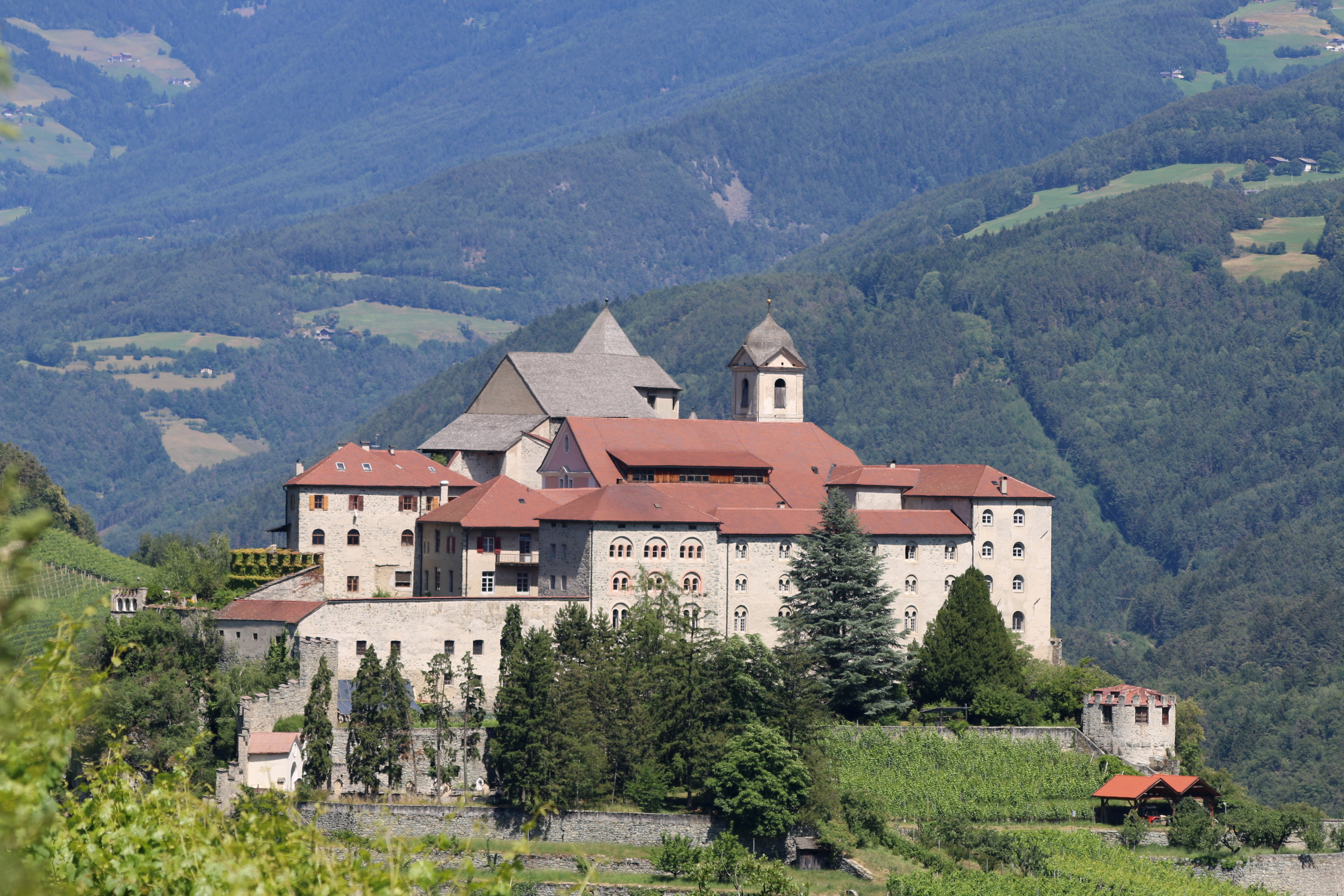
Säben Abbey

== See also ==
- Benedictine Confederation
