= St. Gabriel's Priory =

Benedictine nunnery in Austria

Coordinates: 46°55′53″N 15°57′21″E

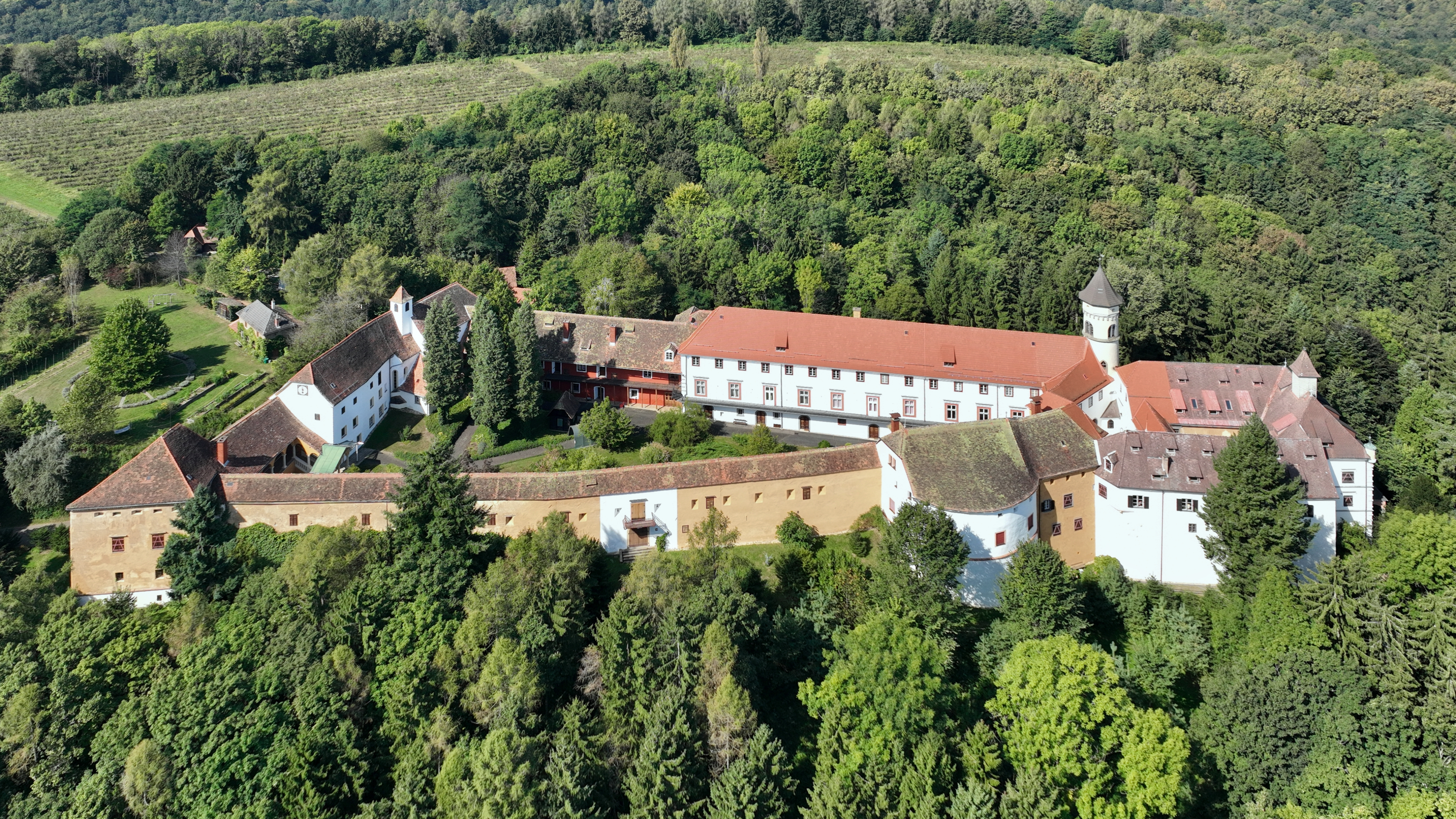
Schloss Bertholdstein, former home of the nunnery

St. Gabriel's Priory, formerly St. Gabriel's Abbey (German: Priorat Sankt Gabriel, Abtei Sankt Gabriel, Kloster Sankt Gabriel), is a Benedictine nunnery in Sankt Johann bei Herberstein, Styria, Austria.

== History ==
The community was founded as a priory in 1889 in Smíchov, now part of Prague, and was raised to the rank of an abbey in 1893. St. Gabriel's was the first women's community to join the Beuronese Congregation within the Benedictine Confederation. After World War I, the predominantly German-speaking community relocated from the newly-independent Czechoslovakia to Schloss Bertholdstein, a castle in Pertlstein in the present municipality of Fehring in Styria.

In 1942, the nunnery was commandeered by the National Socialists; the nuns were expelled and were unable to return until 1946.

In October 2007, the nuns joined the Federation of Sisters of St. Lioba and, as a priory once again, moved to Sankt Johann bei Herberstein in the municipality of Feistritztal, Styria, in November 2008.

The main source of income of the community is from making vestments and church embroidery and taking care of guests.
