= Herstelle Abbey =

Abbey in Herstelle, Germany

Coordinates: 51°38′24″N 9°25′03″E

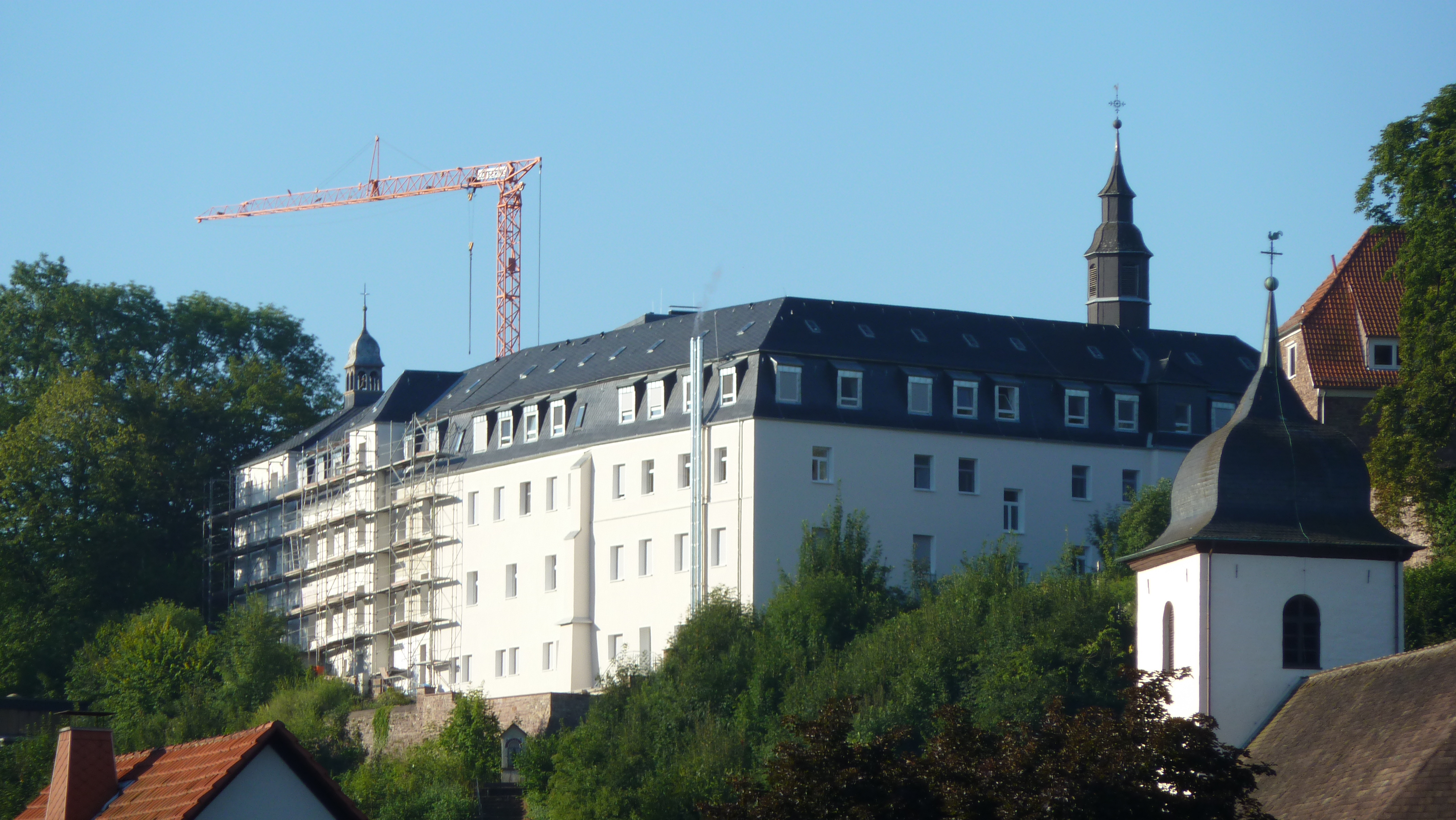
Herstelle Abbey.

Herstelle Abbey, otherwise Abbey of the Holy Cross, Herstelle, is a house of Benedictine nuns in Herstelle, North Rhine-Westphalia, Germany.

The abbey was founded in 1899 on the site of a former convent of the Minorites. In 1924, it was raised to the status of an abbey, and became a member of the Beuronese Congregation within the Benedictine Confederation. In 1962, the nuns of Herstelle founded the priory of Engelthal.

Besides the normal duties of hospitality, the nuns also work in handicrafts.
