= Pertlstein =

- Former municipality
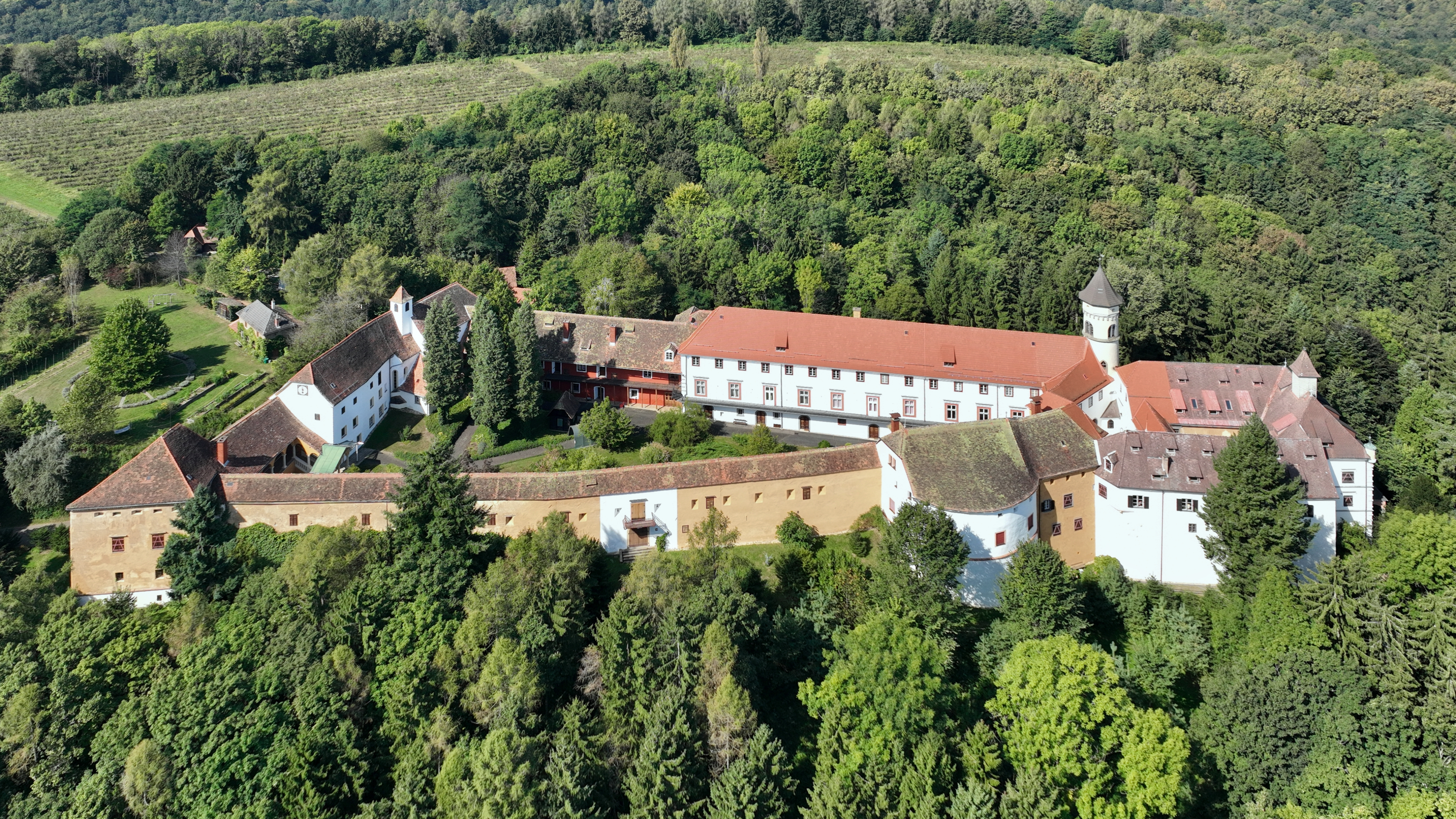
- Bertholdstein Castle in Perlstein

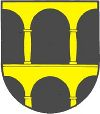
- Coat of arms

- Location within Austria
- Coordinates: 46°56′00″N 15°58′00″E
- Country: Austria
- State: Styria
- District: Südoststeiermark

Area
  - Total: 9.29 km^{2} (3.59 sq mi)
- Elevation: 274 m (899 ft)

Population (1 January 2016)
  - Total: 798
  - Density: 85.9/km^{2} (222/sq mi)
- Time zone: UTC+1 (CET)
  - Summer (DST): UTC+2 (CEST)
- Postal code: 8330, 8344, 8350
- Area code: +43 3155
- Vehicle registration: FB
- Website: www.pertlstein. steiermark.at

Pertlstein is a former municipality in the district of Südoststeiermark in the Austrian state of Styria. Since the 2015 Styria municipal structural reform, it is part of the municipality Fehring.

== Population ==
Historical population
Year	Pop.	±%
1869	573	—
1880	618	+7.9%
1890	608	−1.6%
1900	560	−7.9%
1910	613	+9.5%
1923	683	+11.4%
1934	695	+1.8%
1939	660	−5.0%
1951	651	−1.4%
1961	634	−2.6%
1971	646	+1.9%
1981	713	+10.4%
1991	734	+2.9%
2001	796	+8.4%
2013	797	+0.1%
