= Augustine Stock =

American Benedictine monk

Augustine Stock (January 26, 1920 – May 11, 2001) was an American Benedictine monk and biblical scholar.

== Biography ==
Augustine R. Stock, a native of St. Joseph, Missouri (USA) was a monk of Conception Abbey in Missouri. He entered the monastery in the summer of 1944 after graduating from St. Michael's College at the University of Toronto, and he was ordained to the priesthood on August 28, 1948. In Rome he was awarded an S.T.L. degree from the Pontifical Athenaeum of Saint Anselm. He began teaching at his abbey's seminary college in 1952. In 1962, he served as prior of a Benedictine monastic foundation in Denmark and stayed there for several years. It was the first Catholic monastic foundation in Scandinavia since the Reformation. Upon returning to his home abbey, he taught for more than twenty years at Conception Seminary College.

He served for several years as the associate editor of The American Benedictine Review and was a member of the Catholic Biblical Association.

Stock was a specialist in the Gospel of Mark, having published on literary aspects like chiasms, and even divorce (in Matthew). In his review of Stock's scholarly, verse-by-verse commentary on Mark, titled Method and Message, Quentin Quesnell praised Stock for being "full of fresh ideas and approaches".

== Suspected widespread plagiarism ==
In an article published in 2024, plagiarism expert Michael Dougherty showed that Stock's 1984 article “Chiastic Awareness and Education in Antiquity” was largely plagiarized. The article was cited by dozens of influential theologians in several languages and continues to be referenced by established scholars. Dougherty found that almost every time Stock was credited in later literature, it was for an idea he had copied without attribution. Stock's habit of plagiarizing was widespread and is documented in several of his works.

A further article by Dougherty, this one titled "How Yesterday’s Plagiarism in Theology Affects the Scholarship of Tomorrow," focussed on articles published in Bible Today under Stock's name, but which consisted in large part of plagiarized texts. The monk used long passages taken verbatim from established scholars like Raymond E. Brown and Charles Harold Dodd, but never gave them credit. Verbatim copying was widespread in these articles, sometimes reaching dimensions of 55 and 63 consecutive words copied. Dougherty showed that decades later, these articles were still being cited in major theological publications as though they were Stock's original work.

== Works (selection) ==
- Saint Matthew (translator), Conception Abbey Press, Conception, Mo. 1960.
- Meaning of prophecy and Isaiah (translator, with Marcel Rooney), Conception Abbey Press, Conception, Mo. 1962.
- The Smaller Prophecies (translator), Conception Abbey Press, Conception, Mo. 1960.
- Lamb of God, the promise and fulfullment of salvation, Herder and Herder, New York, 1963.
- Kingdom of heaven; the good tidings of the Gospel, Herder and Herder, New York, 1964.
- The way in the wilderness: Exodus, wilderness, and Moses themes in Old Testament and New, Liturgical Press, Collegeville, Minn. 1969.
- Counting the cost: New Testament teaching on discipleship, Liturgical Press, Collegeville, Minn. 1977.
- Call to discipleship: a literary study of Mark's gospel, Michael Glazier, Wilmington, Del. 1982.
- The Limits of Historical-Critical Exegesis, in: Biblical Theology Bulletin 13.1 (1983): pp. 28–31.
- Hinge Transitions in Mark's Gospel, in: Biblical Theology Bulletin 15.1 (1985): pp. 27–31.
- The Method and Message of Mark, Michael Glazier, Wilmington, Del. 1989.
