= Marcel Rooney =

American Benedictine monk, abbot, liturgist, musician and author

The Most Reverend Marcel Rooney OSB
- a Benedictine monk of Conception Abbey
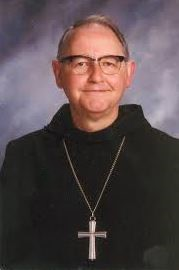
- Previous posts: 8th Abbot Primate of the Order of St. Benedict; Abbot of Conception Abbey; Professor at the Pontifical Atheneum of Sant'Anselmo; Professor at Conception Abbey Seminary

Orders
- Ordination: 1 September 1968 Conception Abbey
- Rank: Abbot Primate emeritus

Personal details
- Born: 20 September 1937 (age 88) Fremont, Nebraska
- Denomination: Roman Catholic
- Residence: Madison, Wisconsin
- Education: S.T.D. 1977 Pontificio Ateneo Sant'Anselmo

Marcel Thomas Rooney, OSB (born September 20, 1937) is an American Benedictine monk, abbot, liturgist, musician, and author. He is a member of Conception Abbey in Conception, Missouri, which is part of the Swiss-American Congregation. He served as the eighth Abbot Primate of the Benedictine Confederation from 1996 to 2000.

== Biography ==
Rooney was born on September 20, 1937, in Fremont, Nebraska. He entered Conception Abbey and made his solemn religious profession as a monk on September 12, 1958. He continued his education earning a B.A. in Philosophy and Theology at the Abbey's seminary. This was followed by his ordination as a priest of the Roman Catholic Church on September 21, 1963. Further education included an S.T.B. from the Catholic University of America in 1964 and an M.A. in Music History from the Eastman Conservatory School of Music in 1971. Rooney then was assigned to the Pontificio Sant'Anselmo in Rome, Italy. He completed a License in Sacred Theology in 1975 followed by a Doctorate of Sacred Theology in 1977. His thesis was entitled "A Theology for Architecture: an Analysis of the Theological Principles applicable to Church Building in the Postconciliar Renewal."

For many years Rooney taught at Conception Seminary sponsored by his home abbey and served as President of the Liturgical Commission of the Diocese of Kansas City-St. Joseph, MO. This was followed from 1986 to 1993 where he taught at the Benedictine Pontifical Institute of Sacred Liturgy and served as a consultant to the Committee on Liturgy for the United States Conference of Catholic Bishops.

On April 14, 1993, Rooney was elected as the Abbot of Conception Abbey. On September 18, 1996, he was elected by over 250 abbots as the eighth Abbot Primate for the Benedictine Confederation, with residence at Sant'Anselmo all'Aventino in Rome, Italy. While his tenure as Abbot Primate was brief, Rooney's most notable work was his assignment by Pope John Paul II to investigate the allegations of sex abuse by Cardinal Hans Hermann Groër who had served as the archbishop of Vienna for nine years until his retirement in 1995.

Upon his resignation on September 13, 2000, for health reasons, Rooney returned to his home abbey in Conception, Missouri, where he served as a chaplain for two years in Savannah, Missouri. In 2005 he moved to Brinkley, Arkansas where he served as Pastor of St. John the Baptist Catholic Church until 2007. In 2007, Rooney was appointed President of a newly founded "Institute of Sacred Liturgy" in the Diocese of Tulsa, Oklahoma. From 2010 to 2011, Rooney was briefly listed as serving on the faculty of the Magdalen College of the Liberal Arts located in Warner, New Hampshire.

In 2011, Rooney sought to develop the "Saint Gregory Institute of Pastoral Liturgy, Music, and Art" at the Durward's Glen retreat center in the Diocese of Madison, Wisconsin, at the invitation of Bishop Robert C. Morlino. This was followed in 2012 where Rooney co-founded the “Orate Institute of Sacred Liturgy, Music, and Art” in the same diocese.

In addition to his many articles and book publications, Rooney continues to reside in the Madison, WI, where he offers his priestly and liturgical services to parishes and the diocese.
