= Frowin Conrad =

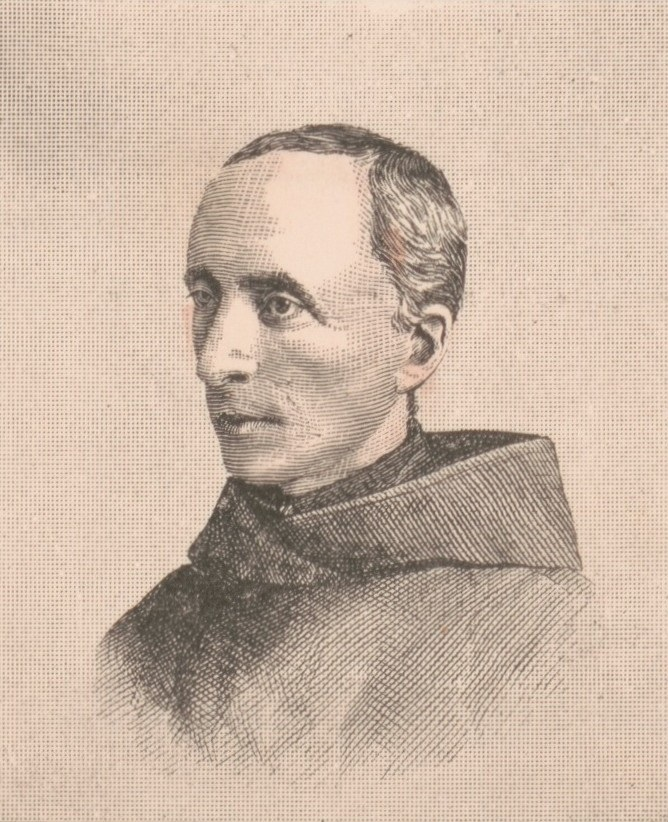
Frowin Conrad circa 1884

Frowin Conrad OSB (baptismal name: Plazidus; 2 November 1833 – 24 March 1923) was a Priest, Benedictine and first abbot of Conception Abbey.

== Biography ==
Frowin Conrad was born in Auw, Aargau, Switzerland, one of a family of fifteen. His family were farmers, and devoutly religious. He completed his secondary education in Engelberg and became a member of Engelberg Abbey in 1852. After he took his religious vows in 1856, he became a priest like his four brothers. After holding various offices in Engelberg Abbey, he became leader of the Engelberg Parish. He moved to the United States with an associate, P. Adelhelm Odermatt, in April 1873; there he founded Conception Abbey (also called "Neu-Engelburg"). From the simplest beginnings, monastic life and seminars were developed. After his appointment as prior in 1876, Father Frowin became the first abbot of the abbey in 1881. In the beginning, he focused on supporting children's education and achieved an agricultural sample operation. From later construction work, multiple monasteries, institutes and hospitals were developed. Father Frowin received multiple awards for the effects of his work.

He died in Conception, Missouri, aged 89.

== Sources ==
- Biographisches Lexikon des Aargaus 1803–1957. Sauerländer, Aarau 1958
