= Gregory Polan =

American Catholic Benedictine Abbot Primate

The Most Reverend Gregory Polan OSB
- Abbot Primate Emeritus
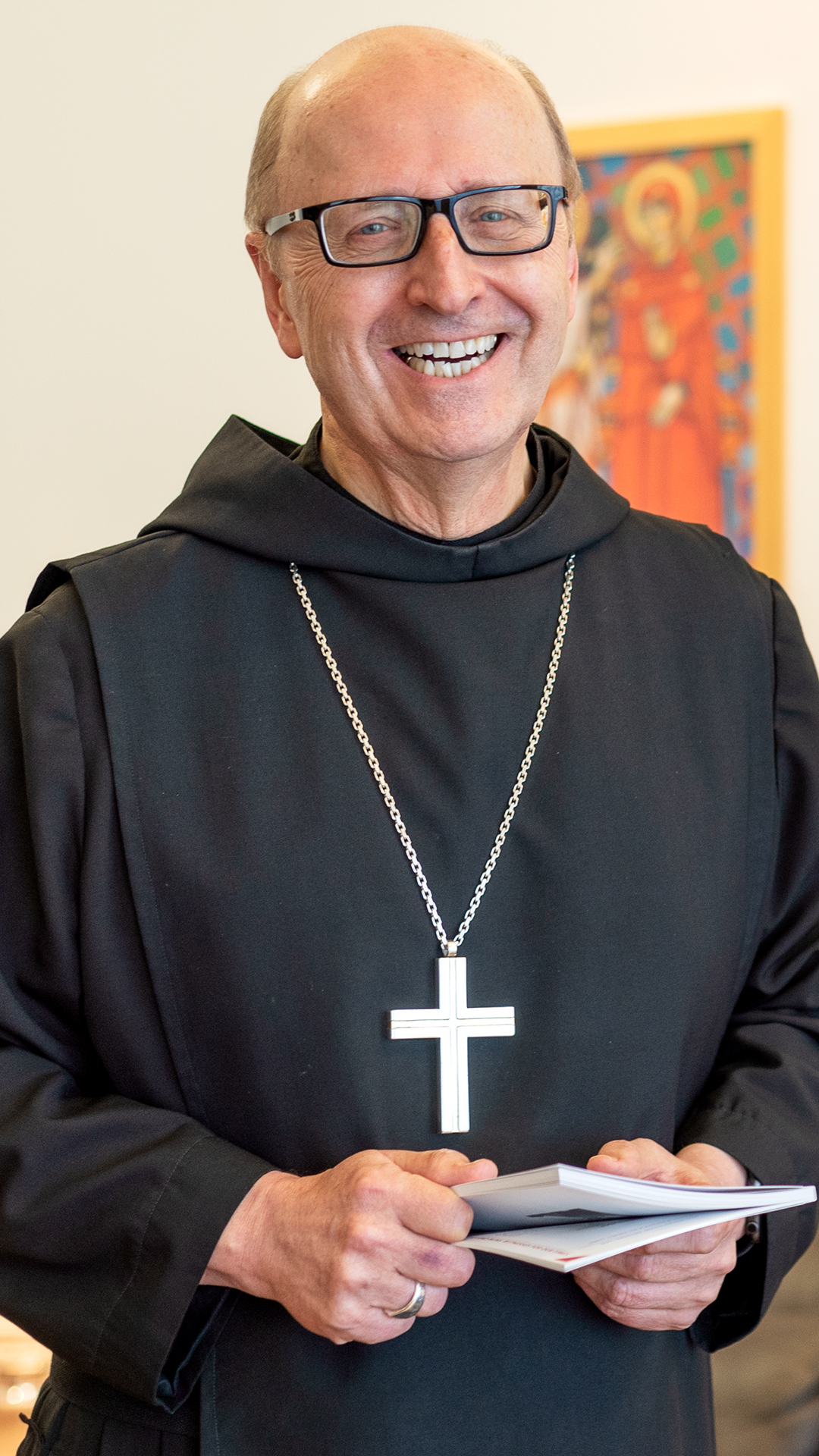
- Polan in 2021
- Elected: 2016
- Term ended: 2024
- Predecessor: Notker Wolf
- Successor: Jeremias Schröder
- Previous post: Abbot of Conception Abbey

Orders
- Ordination: 26 May 1977 Conception Abbey
- Rank: Abbot Primate

Personal details
- Born: John "Jack" Polan; 2 January 1950 (age 76) Berwyn, Illinois, U.S.
- Denomination: Catholic Church
- Residence: Sant'Anselmo all'Aventino Rome, Italy
- Parents: Edward Polan & Martha Kasperski
- Education: PhD in Sacred Scripture (1984 Saint Paul University)

Gregory Polan, OSB (born January 2, 1950) is an American Benedictine monk, priest, scripture scholar, musician, and author. He is a member of Conception Abbey in Conception, Missouri, which is part of the Swiss-American Congregation. He previously served as the ninth abbot of Conception Abbey. From 2016 to 2024, he served as the tenth Abbot Primate of the Benedictine Confederation.

== Biography ==
=== Early life ===
John Polan (known by his family as "Jack") was born on 2 January 1950 in Berwyn, Illinois, USA, to Edward and Martha Rita (née Kasperski) Polan; he has two brothers. He began attending St. Mary's grade school in Riverside, Illinois, followed by the minor seminary of Archbishop Quigley Preparatory Seminary in the Archdiocese of Chicago. Polan made a visit to Conception Abbey in Missouri to explore a call to the Benedictine monastic way of life.

=== Monastic life ===
Polan entered the novitiate of Conception Abbey in 1970 and made his religious profession as a monk on 28 August 1971, being given the name of "Gregory." He continued further studies in Philosophy and Theology and completed his M.A. in Theology 1975 at St. John's School of Theology. He was ordained a priest on 26 May 1977. After returning to his home abbey for a short period of pastoral work and teaching, he was later assigned to Saint Paul University in Ottawa, Canada, to complete further studies in biblical exegesis. In 1984 he received his Ph.D. in Sacred Scripture with his dissertation entitled "In the ways of justice toward salvation: a rhetorical analysis of Isaiah 56-59."

Upon returning to Conception Abbey, he began teaching in the Abbey's College Seminary (Scripture, Hebrew, Greek, Liturgy, Music) and served for ten years as President-Rector of the College Seminary. On 6 November 1996 he was elected the ninth abbot of Conception Abbey. During his time as abbot he continued work in teaching, offering retreats, assisting with translations of the New American Bible, and serving as a consultant to the United States Conference of Catholic Bishops.

Polan was brought to the larger public attention on 11 June 2002 when he had to serve as the spokesperson for his abbey following a tragedy. A gunman carrying an assault rifle entered the monastery, killing two monks and injuring another two. The gunman subsequently killed himself in the encounter with police; a motive for the killer's actions was never made clear.

Polan is a translator of liturgical texts. A project to revise the Grail Psalms translation began in 1998 and received final approval from the Vatican in 2018. He was also involved with the revised Liturgy of the Hours, the Lectionary, the New American Bible, and the Roman Missal.

On 16 September 2016 Polan was elected the Abbot Primate of the Order of St. Benedict and the Benedictine Confederation. The office of Abbot Primate was created by Pope Leo XIII in 1893 to serve the Benedictine monastic community as its liaison to the Vatican and civil authorities, to promote unity among the various autonomous Benedictine monasteries and congregations, and to represent Benedictines at religious gatherings around the globe. Until 14 September 2024, he served as abbot of the Primatial Abbey of Sant'Anselmo, the grand Chancellor of the Pontifical University of Saint Anselm, and oversaw the College of Sant'Anselmo in his appointment of its prior and rector. Polan was the tenth Abbot Primate and the fourth American to be elected.

== Selected bibliography ==
- In the ways of justice toward salvation: a rhetorical analysis of Isaiah 56-59, New York: Peter Lang 1986 (ISBN 978-0-8204-0280-2)
- The Revised Grail Psalms: a liturgical Psalter, with Frances E. George, Collegeville: Liturgical Press 2012 (ISBN 978-0-8146-3483-7)
- The Psalms songs of faith and praise: the Revised Grail Psalter with commentary and prayers, Mahwah: Paulist Press 2014 (ISBN 978-0-8091-4882-0)
- Die Psalmen: Impulse zu den ältesten Gebeten der Bibel: der Münsterschwarzacher Psalter, with Matthias Hofmann (in German), Münsterschwarzach: Vier-Türme-Verlag 2020 (ISBN 978-3-7365-0306-9)
- Compositions of Gregory J. Polan at Hymnary.org
- numerous articles, book reviews, conferences, lectures, and videos
