= Conception Abbey =

Benedictine monastery in Conception, Missouri

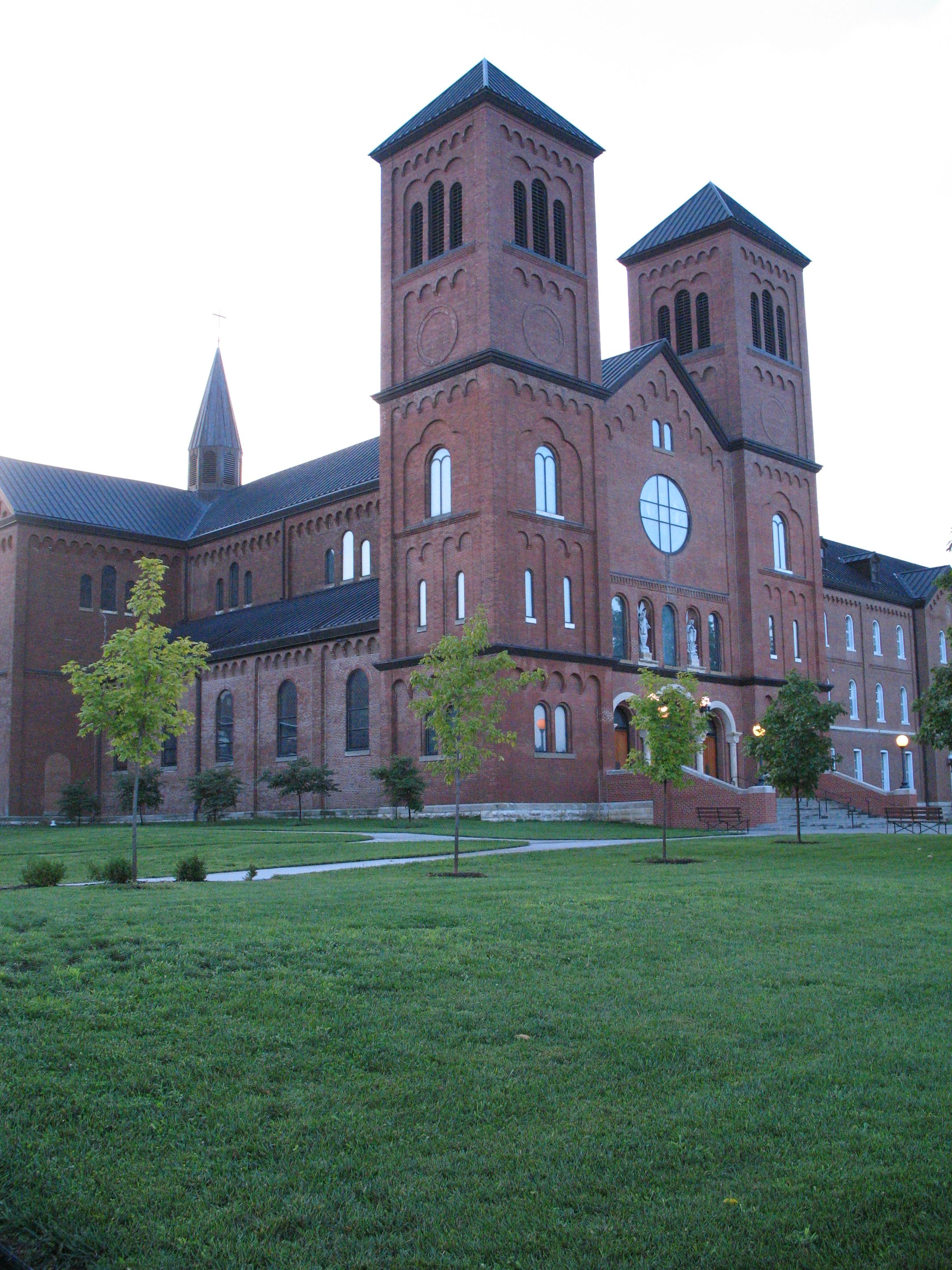
- Conception Abbey in 2006

- Location within Missouri Location within the United States

Monastery information
- Order: Order of St. Benedict
- Established: 8 December 1873
- Mother house: Engelberg Abbey
- Diocese: Diocese of Kansas City-Saint Joseph
- Controlled churches: Basilica of the Immaculate Conception

People
- Founders: Frs. Frowin Conrad and Meinrad Widmer
- Abbot: Right Rev. Paul Sheller, O.S.B.
- Prior: Brother Anselm Broom, O.S.B.

Architecture
- Functional status: Abbey

Site
- Location: Conception, Missouri
- Coordinates: 40.2398°N 94.6815°W
- Website: conceptionabbey.org

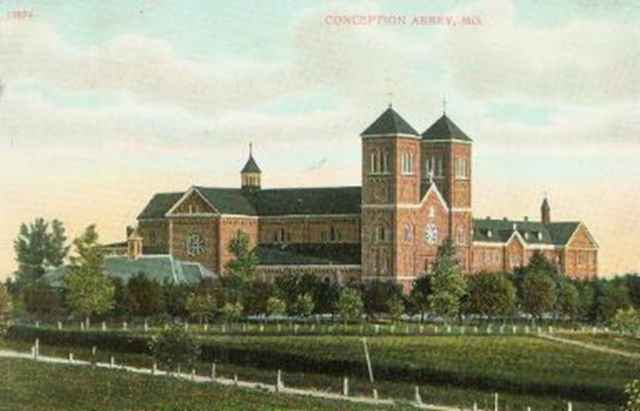
Conception Abbey from 1908 postcard

Conception Abbey is a monastery of the Swiss-American Congregation of the Benedictine Confederation, located in Conception, Missouri. Founded by the Swiss Engelberg Abbey in 1873, it was raised to a conventual priory in 1876 and elevated to an abbey in 1881. In 2021 the community numbered 58 monks. They administer Conception Seminary College, the Printery House, and the Abbey Guest Center. Monks also serve in the Diocese of Kansas City–Saint Joseph and elsewhere.

== History ==
Conception Abbey was established on 8 December 1873, by Benedictine monks of the Swiss abbey of Engelberg as a place of refuge should their monastery be suppressed by the Swiss government. They also came in response to the appeal of the Rev. James Power to minister to the spiritual needs of a colony of Irish and German settlers which he had established in northwest Missouri in 1858, prior to the Civil War. Benedictine Sisters from Maria Richenbach, a convent located not far from Engelberg, arrived in Missouri in 1873 soon after the monks, hoping ultimately to found a convent where special devotion to the Eucharist could be fostered.

The founders of Conception Abbey were Fathers Frowin Conrad (1833–1923), and Meinrad Widmer (1844–1901), of Lucerne, Switzerland. Frowin Conrad, named Placid at birth, was born in Auw, Canton Argau, Switzerland, on 2 November 1833, the eldest of twelve children, eleven boys and one girl. Of the eleven boys, five became priests, four of these Benedictine monks. Educated by Jesuits as a youth, he entered the abbey school of Einsiedeln to study theology and then entered monastic life at Engelberg.

Frowin made his profession in 1853 and was ordained a priest in 1856. In the next seventeen years, he served as prefect and professor in Engelberg's school, held many of the major offices in the monastery (including the important post of novice-master), pastor of the monastery's parish, and chaplain to the nearby convent of Maria Richenbach. These appointments witness the fact that he enjoyed the complete confidence of the abbot of Engelberg, Anselm Villiger.

Having been directed to found a monastery of his order in the United States in 1873, Frowin founded the Benedictine monastery of New Engleberg at Conception, which was erected into an abbey in 1881. In 1885, Frowin was chosen as the abbey's first abbot.

Meinrad Widmer was baptized as Joseph Widmer on 1 March 1844 at Hohenrain, Canton Luzern, Switzerland. During his boyhood he attended the Catholic school of his hometown, was confirmed in 1855, and later worked on the family farm. The Mother General of the Sisters of Mercy at Ingenbohl, Canton Schwyz, employed him to work on the extensive farm of their convent. When he was twenty-eight, he left Ingenbohl for Grafenort in Unterwalden to work on the estate belonging to the Abbey of Engelberg. There he met Frowin Conrad and soon afterwards decided to become part of the new Benedictine foundation. At his religious profession he took the name Meinrad, perhaps in honor of the monastery of Saint Meinrad in Indiana, whose abbot and prior were so helpful in the early days of the Engelberg foundation.

Joining Frowin and Meinrad was Adelhelm Odermatt. He was born Karl Odermatt on 10 December 1844 at Ennetmoos nears Stans, Nidwalden. He entered Engelberg as a novice on 29 September 1865. He became a professor in Engelberg's school and assistant pastor of the Engelberg parish at the time Frowin Conrad was pastor of the parish. Adelhelm was assigned to Maryville as pastor of the parish there.

Adelhelm and Frowin, prior of the new foundation, seem to have disagreed about the nature of the new foundation in Missouri: Frowin was influenced by the customs of the Beuronese foundations and Saint Meinrad Abbey in Indiana while Adelhelm hoped to reproduce in the United States Engelberg's observance and spirit. Adelhelm and another Engelberg monk left Conception on 1 June 1881 seeking a location for a new monastery. They established Mount Angel Abbey in 1882.

In 1880, according to the U.S. Federal Census enumerated in June, the monks numbered twenty-two in their household (eight priests, six clerics, two novices, and six laybrothers) and the sisters another twenty-four in a separate household. In the Album Benedictum published for 1880 it was noted that the monks served the following parishes: one priest served the cathedral in St. Joseph, Missouri, one priest served Saint Columba Parish in Conception, Missouri (with its missions at Albany, Saint Patrick's, Dolorosa in Gentry County, and Guilford and Whitesfield in Worth County), and two priests served Saint Mary Parish in Maryville and its stations in Nodaway County at Barnard, Bolkow, Hopkins, Pickering, and Rosendale. The Album Benedictum noted for 1880 that the library contained 3000 volumes.

In 1960, the community numbered 82 priest monks, 24 monks preparing for the priesthood, 27 laybrothres, six novices for the priesthood, and five for the lay brother institute.

=== Acknowledgement of sex abuse ===
In 2019, Abbot Benedict Neenan, the monastery's abbot, unveiled a list of 8 monks who were credibly accused of committing acts of sex abuse while serving on behalf of Conception Abbey, seven of whom are dead and one removed from ministry. These monks were: Vincent Barsch, Bede Parry, Edgar Probstfield, Regis Probstfield, Gilbert Stack, Hugh Tasch, Paschal Thomas, and Isaac True. An additional deceased monk with a credible allegation was added to this list in 2020: Vincent Heinen. Abbot Benedict Neenan also issued an "unconditional apology to all victims and their families affected by the evil of clergy sexual abuse.”

== College and Seminary ==
=== College of New Engelberg ===
The school was founded on 2 July 1886 and was called the College of New Engelberg with classes offered on the high school and junior college level. By 1915 the college enrolled 118 students.

=== Conception Seminary ===
In 1942 under the guidance of Abbot Stephen Schappler the college changed its name and restricted enrollment to candidates for the priesthood, offering a 12-year program including a preparatory high school, a junior college, a senior college, and a school of theology. In 1956 the Benedictine High School was moved to Omaha. The seminary's enrollment peaked at 549 students in 1965 but went into decline following the Second Vatican Council.

Clarence Thomas studied to become a priest at the seminary in 1968, and in 1991 was named to the United States Supreme Court.

=== Conception Seminary College ===
In 1972 the theology school closed and it focused on being a liberal arts school. A pre-theology curriculum was added in 1982. The college now estimates that it has educated 75 percent of the priests in the Kansas City-St. Joseph diocese.

== The Printery House ==
One of the main endeavors of the Abbey has been The Printery House. It began as an in-house publication effort in the 1930s, would expand to become Conception Abbey Press in the 1950s, and then would change its name to The Printery House in 1973. It is noted for its calligraphy and artwork for the stationery they create and distribute.

== Abbots ==
Coat of arms of Abbot Paul Sheller.

- 1881-1922 Frowin Conrad
- 1922-1937 Philip Ruggle
- 1937-1961 Stephen Schappler
- 1961-1970 Anselm Coppersmith
- 1970-1976 Kevin McGonigle
- 1977-1987 Jerome Hanus (later ordained as Bishop)
- 1987-1993 James Jones
- 1993-1996 Marcel Rooney (later became Abbot Primate of the Benedictine Confederation from 1996 to 2000)
- 1996-2016 Gregory Polan (later Abbot Primate of the Benedictine Confederation from 2016 to 2024)
- 2016–2026 Benedict Neenan
- 2026– Paul Sheller

== Basilica ==
The Abbey Church of Conception was designed by Adrian Wewer, a Franciscan. The cornerstone was laid on 20 May 1883, and it was dedicated on 10 May 1891. Two years later in 1893 it was hit by a tornado. As the church was rebuilt the Beuron murals were added. On 10 May 1941 Pope Pius XII declared it a minor basilica. A two-decade, $9 million restoration was completed in 1999.

== Foundations ==
Over the decades Conception Abbey attempted a number of foundations: St. Michael Priory in Cottonwood, Idaho; St. Benedict Abbey in Benet Lake, Wisconsin (1945); Mount Michael Abbey in Elkhorn, Nebraska (1953); St. Pius X Monastery in Pevely, Missouri (1951); and Skt. Knud's Kloster, a priory in Copenhagen, Denmark. St. Benedict Abbey and Mt. Michael Abbey are the two foundations functioning today.

== 2002 shooting ==
At about 8:40 am, on the morning of 10 June 2002, a 71-year-old man identified as Lloyd Robert Jeffress of Kearney, Missouri, went through the basilica into the monastery, killing Brother Damian Larson, 62, and Fr. Philip Schuster, 84. He wounded the priests Kenneth Reichert, 68, and Norbert Schappler, 75. Jeffress carried into the basilica two boxes – one containing a MAK-90 rifle (a replica of the AK-47) and a stripped down .22-caliber Ruger rifle. Having made the circuit of the monastery hallways, Jeffress returned to the basilica where he shot and killed himself. Larson and Schuster were buried in the abbey cemetery following the Mass of Christian Burial celebrated on 14 June, at which 1200 relatives and friends of the abbey were present. No motive was determined for the shooting.

A 2008 documentary was produced by St. Louis filmmaker Jay Kanzler. The film, which was shown at the 2008 St. Louis International Film Festival.
