= Sant'Anselmo all'Aventino =

- Saint Anselm on the Aventine
- Badia Sant'Anselmo
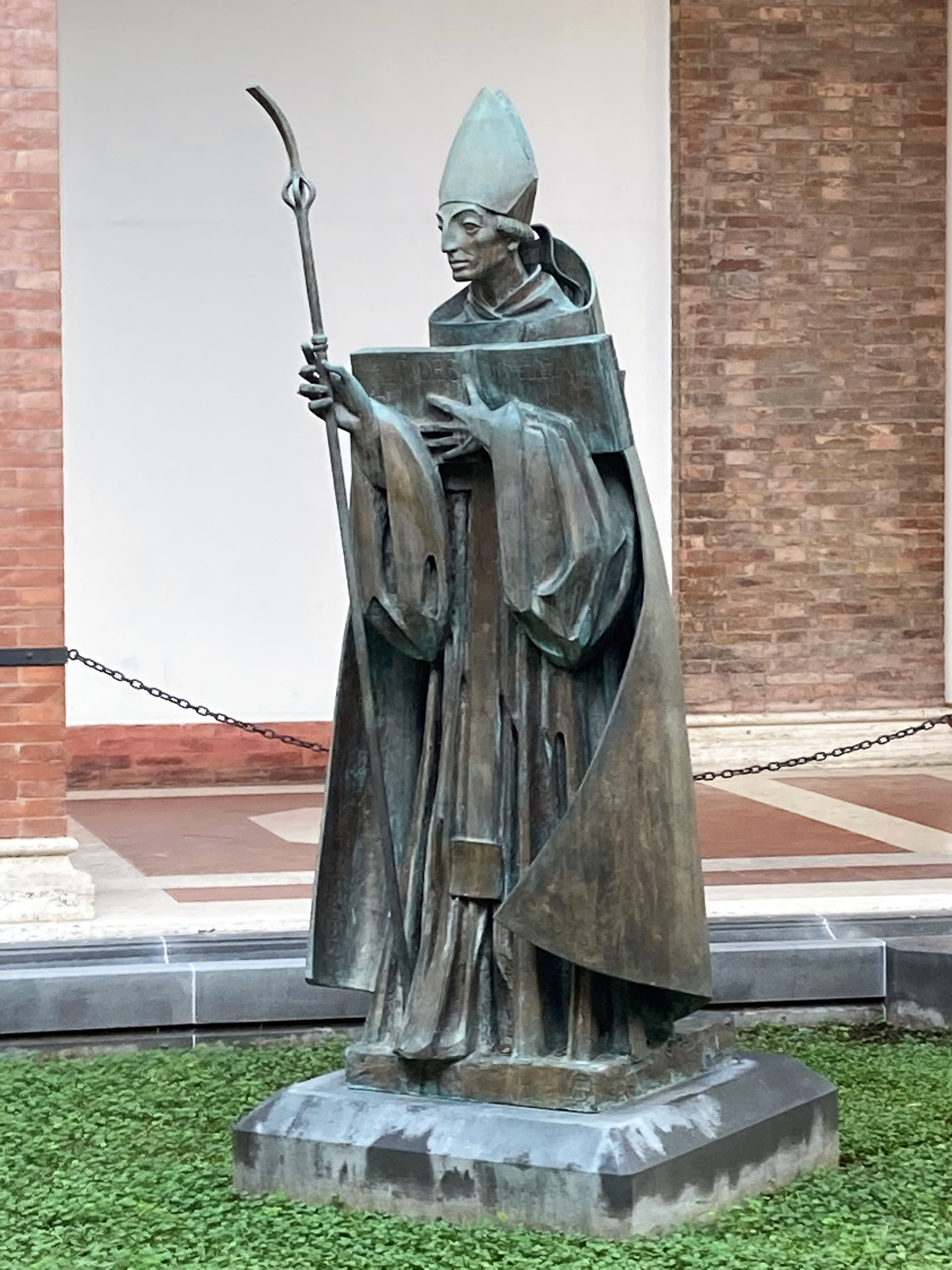
- Click on the map for a fullscreen view
- 41°52′56.3″N 12°28′41.0″E
- Location: Piazza dei Cavalieri di Malta, 5
- Country: Italy
- Denomination: Catholic Church
- Religious order: Benedictines

History
- Founded: 4 January 1888
- Founder: Pope Leo XIII
- Dedicated: April 19, 1893
- Consecrated: November 11, 1900

Architecture
- Architect(s): Hildebrand de Hemptinne and Fidelis von Stotzingen
- Style: Romanesque Revival
- Years built: 8
- Groundbreaking: 1892
- Completed: 1900
- Construction cost: 2,500,000 lire

Administration
- Diocese: Rome

Clergy
- Abbot: Abbot Primate Jeremias Schröder, O.S.B.
- Rector: College: Rev. Brendan Coffey, O.S.B.; University: Rev. Jákó Örs Fehérváry, O.S.B.; Church: Rev. Sebastiano Edawazhickal Paul, O.S.B.

Sant'Anselmo all'Aventino (English: Saint Anselm on the Aventine) is a Benedictine complex located on the Piazza Cavalieri di Malta Square on the Aventine Hill in Ripa, Rome. It includes an abbey, is the headquarters of the Benedictine Confederation and is the residence of the Abbot Primate. It is also known as the Primatial Abbey of Sant'Anselmo (Italian: Badia Sant'Anselmo).

The complex consists of the College of Sant'Anselmo (Italian: Collegio Sant'Anselmo), the Pontifical Athenaeum of Saint Anselm" (Italian: Pontificio Ateneo Sant’Anselmo), the Church of Sant'Anselmo (Italian: Chiesa Sant'Anselmo) and the curial headquarters of the Benedictine Confederation. The complex and associated institutions are named in honor of the Benedictine monk Saint Anselm of Canterbury.

== History ==
On January 4, 1887, Pope Leo XIII issued a papal brief ("Quae diligenter") that formally commissioned the re-establishment of a residential college for the new Benedictine Confederation. The previous College of Sant'Anselmo that had been founded two hundred years earlier by Pope Innocent XI for students from the Cassinese Benedictine Congregation was to now be re-established for Benedictine monks from around the world. Housing would become a critical challenge so the Benedictines began a search for more permanent accommodations for this college.

Abbot Gaetano Bernardi began the search for suitable land and was approached by Count Allesandro Barbiellini Amidei who owned property on the western Aventine Hill which had contained the previous fortifications of a house for Pope Paul III. Arrangements were made for the purchase of the 43,000 square meter property for 270,000 lire which was formally titled to the Vatican as it remains to this day. In his July 26, 1890, circular letter, Abbot Bernardi wrote that "It is on the Aventine Hill on which our St. Odo (of Cluny), thanks to the generosity of Alberich from the family of the Counts of Tusculum, built a monastery and church in honor of Mary...." He further mentioned that Pope Gregory VII had spent his youth in a monastery there and recounted, "Of all the places in Rome what better placed could we have wished for!" The newly envisioned complex would allow for the housing of the residential college, a church, and the central offices of the Benedictine Confederation.

The entire "Sant'Anselmo" complex on the Aventine Hill was designed by Belgian Benedictine Abbot Hildebrand de Hemptinne and Fidelis von Stotzingen and built by Francesco Vespignani between 1892 and 1896 in a neo-romanesque style. Construction began in 1892 and the cornerstone was dedicated on April 19, 1893. The final cost was 2,500,000 lire and was dedicated in honor of the Benedictine monk Saint Anselm of Canterbury. To honor the founding vision of Pope Leo XIII, a large sculpture of him was crafted in 1891 by Giuseppe Luchetti and is located in the interior sacristy of the church. A large marble plaque of dedication is also found on the north exterior wall as you approach the entrance to the complex.

== Church of Sant'Anselmo ==
The area of the Sant'Anselmo complex open to the general public is the church which was consecrated on November 11, 1900. The church was consecrated by Cardinal Mariano Rampolla del Tindaro, assisted by twelve cardinals, sixteen archbishops and bishops, fifty-two abbots, rectors of all the major colleges of Rome, superiors general of the major religious orders, and all ambassadors accredited to the Holy See. It is constructed of three naves, divided by granite columns, and includes one main altar and two side altars. The ceiling is a truss and the crypt was made of five naves with sixteen side altars. In 1952 there was a renovation of the church interior by architect Fritz Metsger. This saw the construction of elevated choir stalls for the monks in the transepts, the addition of an altar under the arch that allowed the priest to face either direction in celebrating mass, and the creation of three main mosaics by the German monk Radbodus Commandeur. The mosaics are located above the two side altars, as well as above the main apse which depicts the jeweled cross between angels and Saints Benedict and Anselm. Commandeur also completed the mosaic under the main altar covering the reliquary containing the relics of Saint Alexander of Rome. He also produced numerous pieces within the monastic enclosure of the College as seen in the gallery of photos below. The paschal candle stick is modern but in the Cosmatesque style. The lower level has now been converted to the use of the library for the University. In the courtyard of the atrium, there is a bronze statue of Saint Anselm made in 1966 by Swiss sculptor Albert Wider from Widnau. From here, it is possible to see Santa Maria del Priorato of the Knights of Malta, which lies in an adjacent complex that is closed to the public. In the entrance to the Sant'Anselmo complex, reached from the atrium, is a Roman Orpheus mosaic from a second-third century home that was found during construction.

There have been four pipe organs in the church since its founding. The first organ (built by William Trice in 1891) was installed in 1896. It would later be moved to the present location in the Chapel of St. Lawrence located in the Basilica of Saint Paul Outside the Walls. The second organ (built by Klais Orgelbau of Bonn) had been installed in 1911 in the left side aisle. It would later be moved to the present location in the Basilica of Regina degli Apostoli alla Montagnola. In 1952 the third organ (built by Emanuel Kemper of Lübeck) was installed in the central apse when the altar was moved under the arch. In 1966 a further renovation moved the organ from the apse and replaced it with a Celebrant's chair and an area for the concelebrants. This third organ would later be moved to the present location in the Church of San Martino in Campo (Perugia). The present organ by Österreichische Orgelbau was installed in 1967 and renovated by Ditta Mascioni in 1999. It is located on the eastern wall transept above the monastic choir.

The church serves as a place of worship for the Benedictine residential college community and the students of the Athenaeum. It is also known, especially to the Romans, for the performances of Gregorian chant offered by the monks during the Sunday liturgical celebrations of Vespers. Since 1962, the church has also been the starting point of the penitential procession presided over by the Pope on Ash Wednesday, and which ends at the basilica of Santa Sabina where the first stationary mass of Lent is celebrated. The church is named in honor of the Benedictine monk Saint Anselm of Canterbury. The present Rector of the church is Sebastiano Edawazhickal Paul.

=== Cardinal-Deacons ===
In 1985 Pope John Paul II made the church a "cardinalate diakonia" or titular deaconary. The Cardinal Protectors of the Church of Sant'Anselmo have been:

- Paul Augustin Mayer (25 May 1985 Appointed - 30 Apr 2010 Died)
- Fortunato Baldelli (20 Nov 2010 Appointed - 20 Sep 2012 Died)
- Lorenzo Baldisseri (22 February 2014 – present)

== College of Sant'Anselmo ==
The College of Sant'Anselmo (Italian: Collegio Sant'Anselmo) is an ecclesiastical residential college in the Roman tradition that serves as both a house of formation for Benedictines, but also as a residence for over one hundred monks from around forty countries, religious, diocesan priests, and lay people. It offers a monastic environment for those who study at the onsite Pontifical Athenaeum of Saint Anselm or at other Roman pontifical universities. The present Rector of the College is Brendan Coffey.

== Pontifical University of Sant'Anselmo ==
The Anselmianum, also known as the Pontifical Athenaeum of Saint Anselm (Italian: Pontificio Ateneo Sant'Anselmo; Latin: Pontificium Athenaeum Anselmianum), is a pontifical university in Rome associated with the Benedictines. The institution includes faculties of Philosophy, Theology (Sacramental Theology, Monastic Studies), the Institute of Historical Theology, as well as the Pontifical Institute of Liturgy. It grants certificates and diplomas in various subjects, as well as Bachelor, Licentiate, and Doctoral degrees. Originally the university exclusively served only Benedictines, but now is open to external students. The present Rector of the Pontifical Athenaeum is Jákó Örs Fehérváry.

== Curia of the Benedictine Confederation & Abbot Primate ==
The Benedictine Confederation is a union of monastic congregations that nevertheless retain their own autonomy, established by Pope Leo XIII on July 12, 1893, in his brief "Summum semper". The Confederation has its headquarters at Sant'Anselmo, is the seat of the Abbot Primate, and hosts the quadrennial Congress of Abbots. The Abbot Primate of the Benedictine Confederation from 2016 to 2024 was Gregory Polan, O.S.B. The present Abbot Primate is Jeremias Schröder, O.S.B.

== Gallery ==
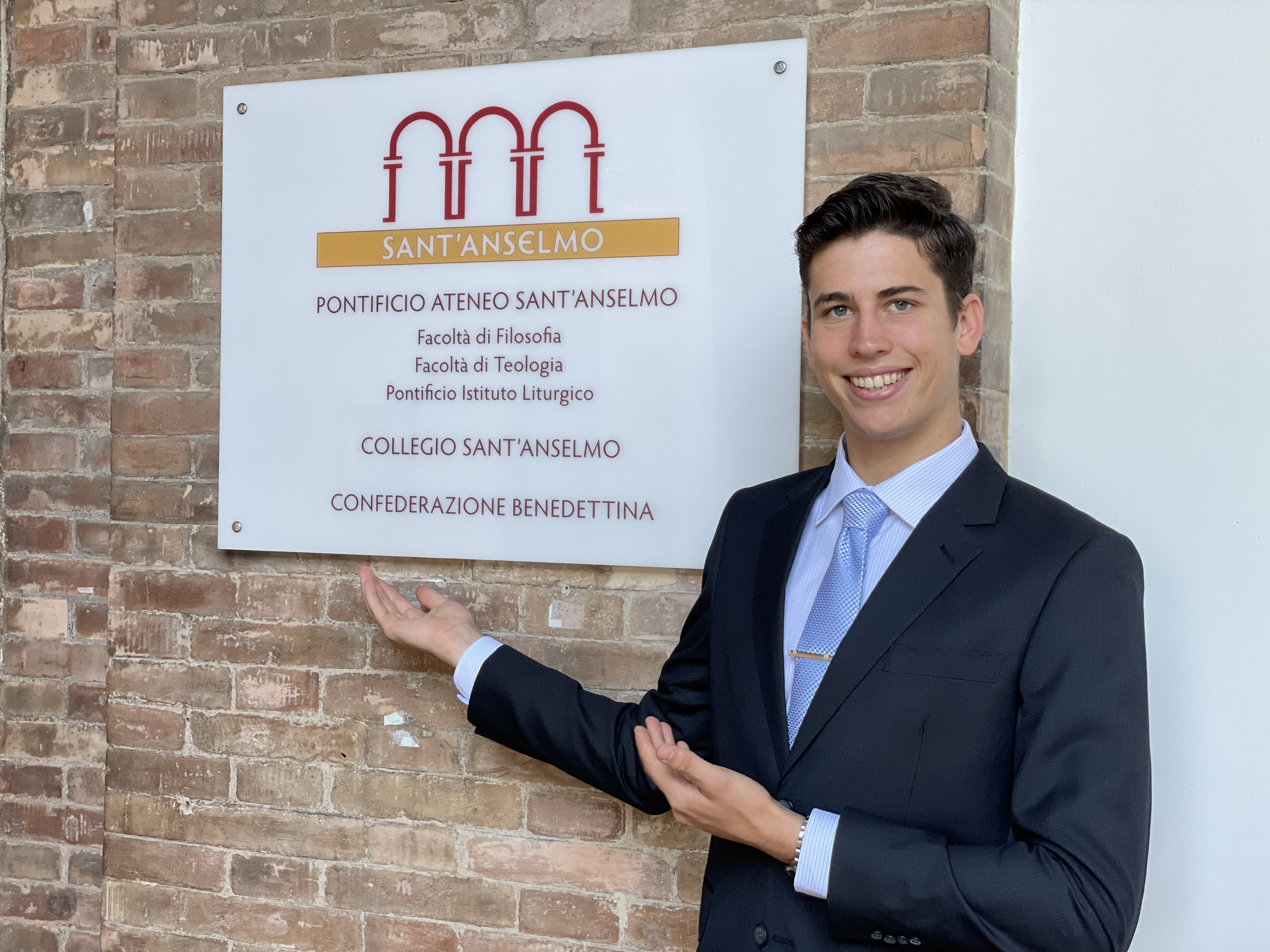

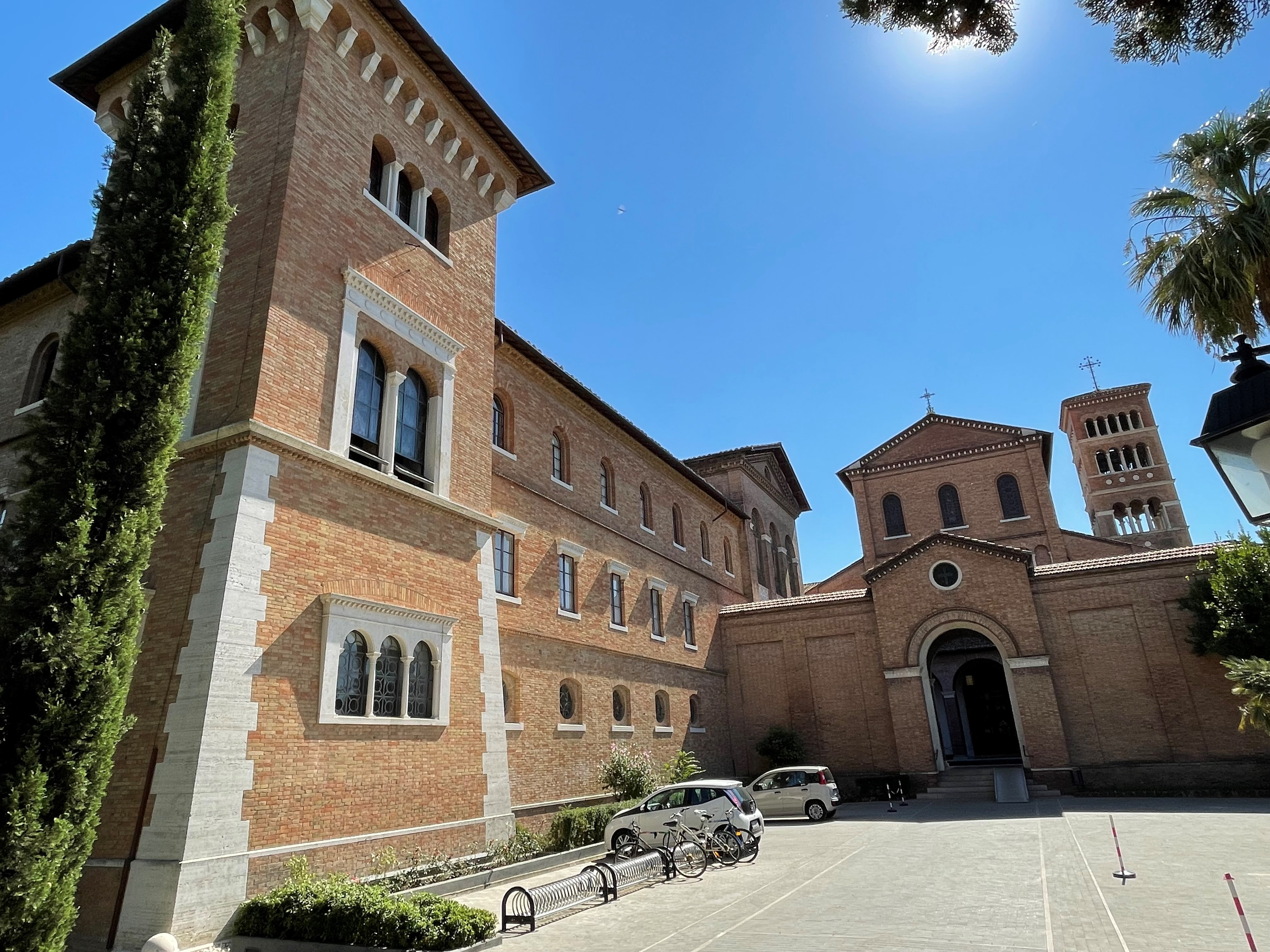

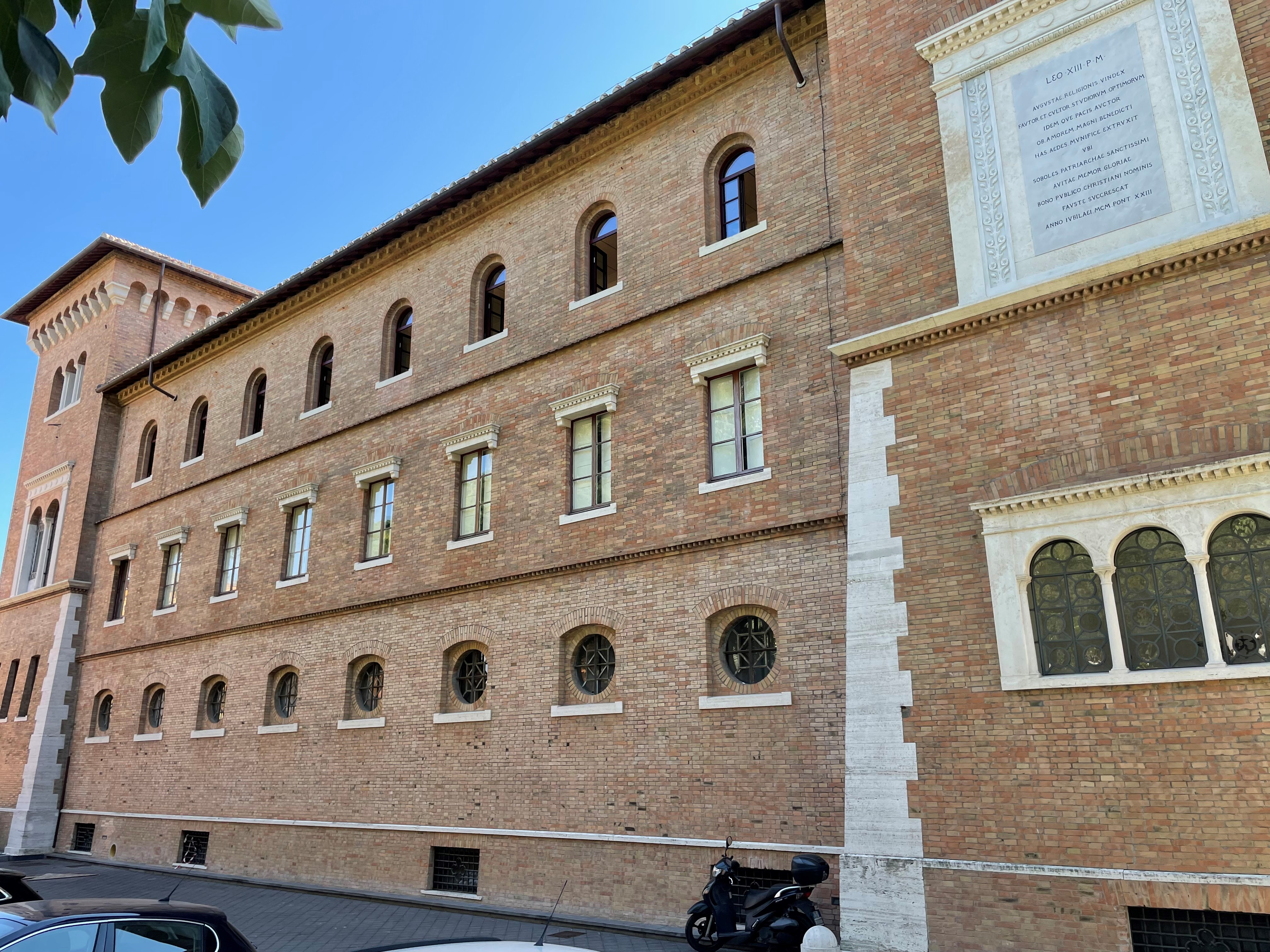

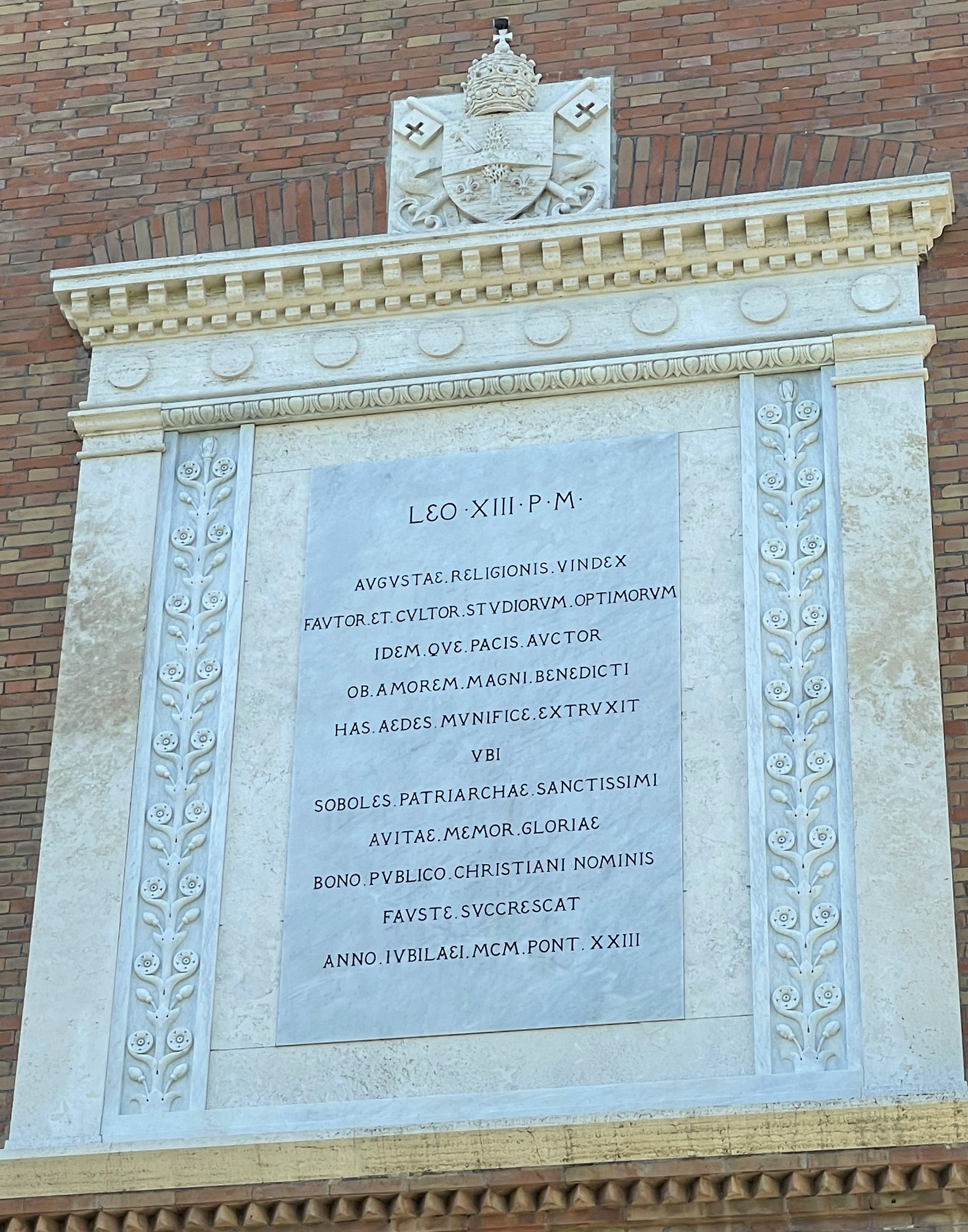

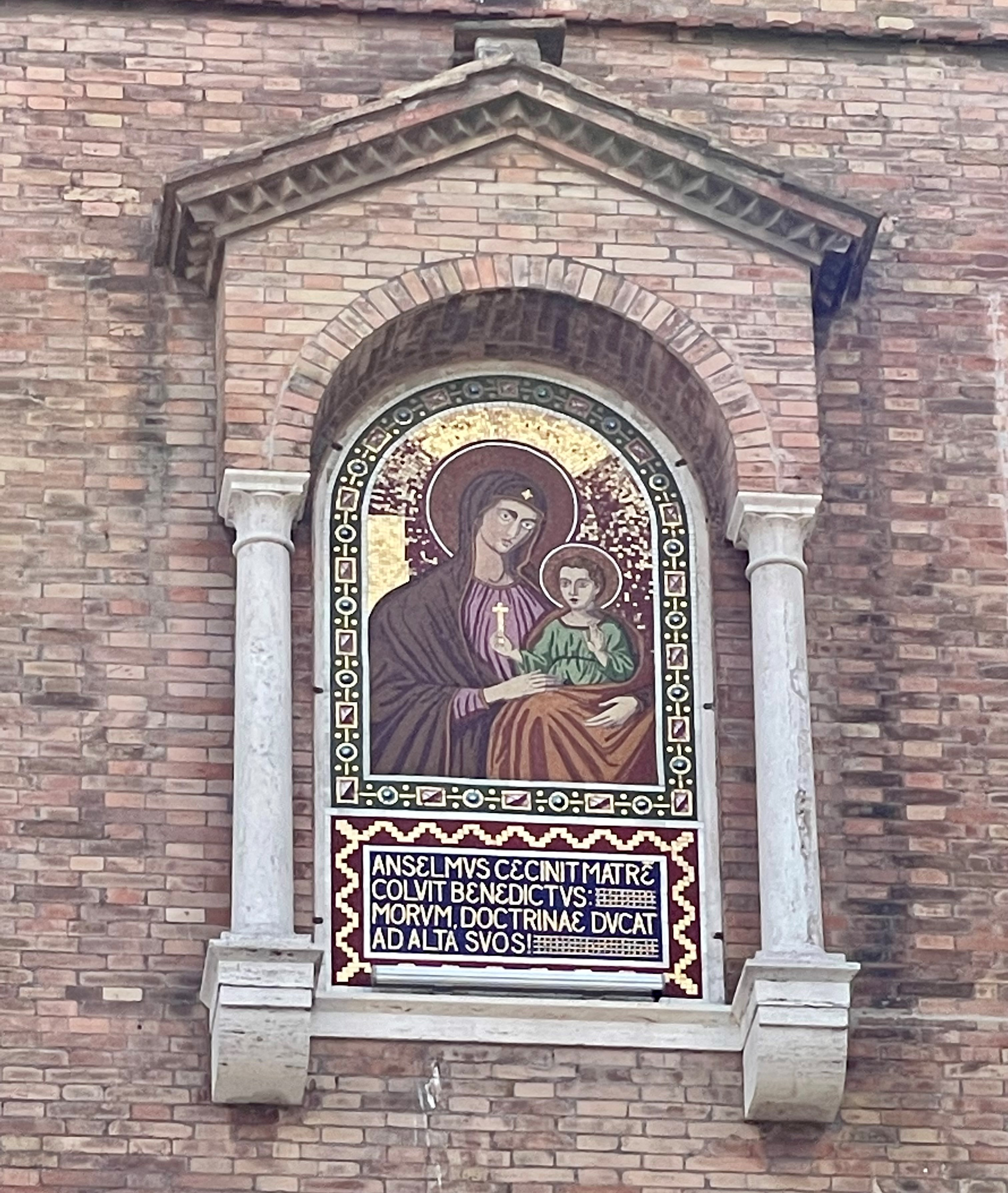

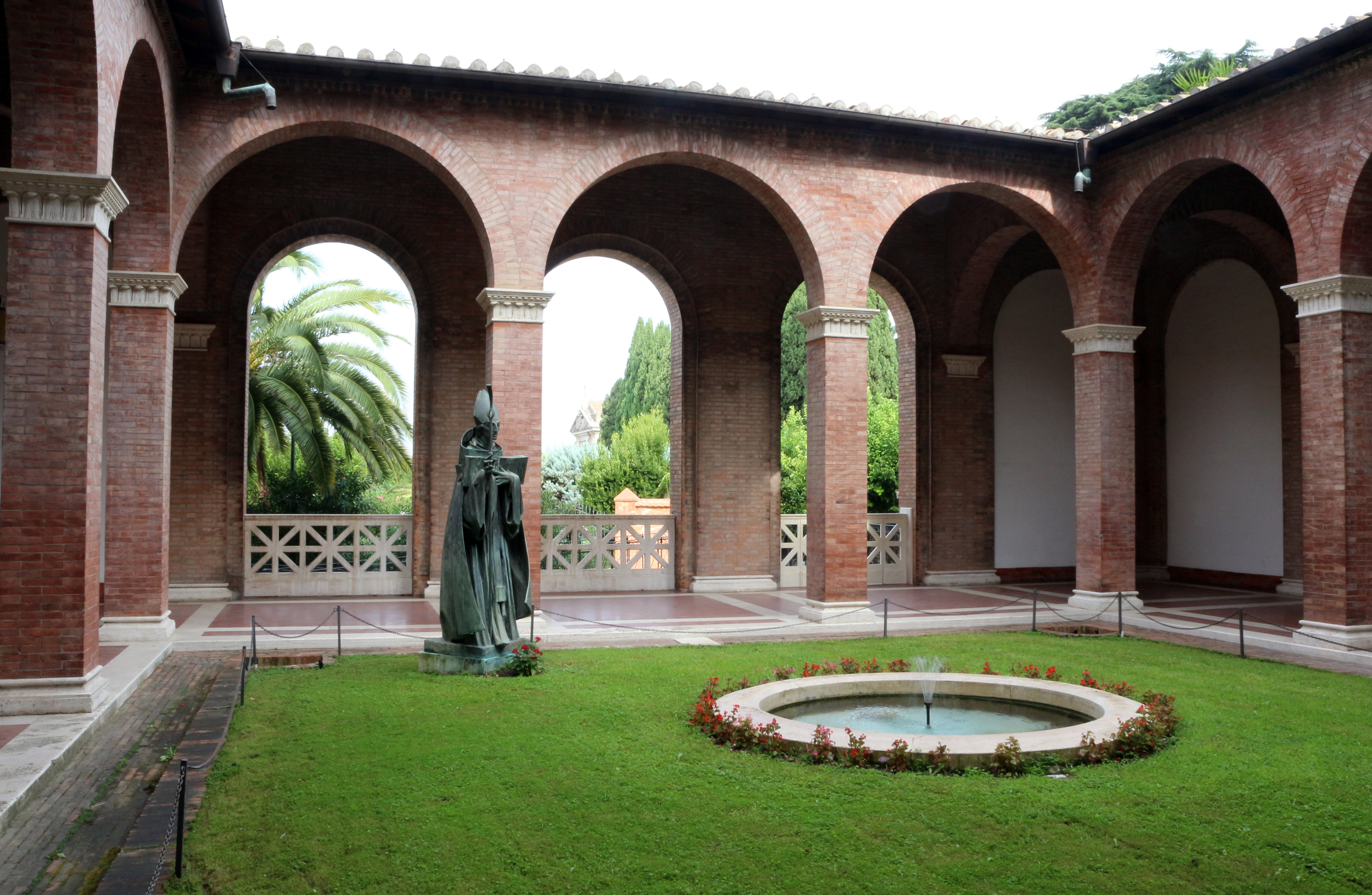

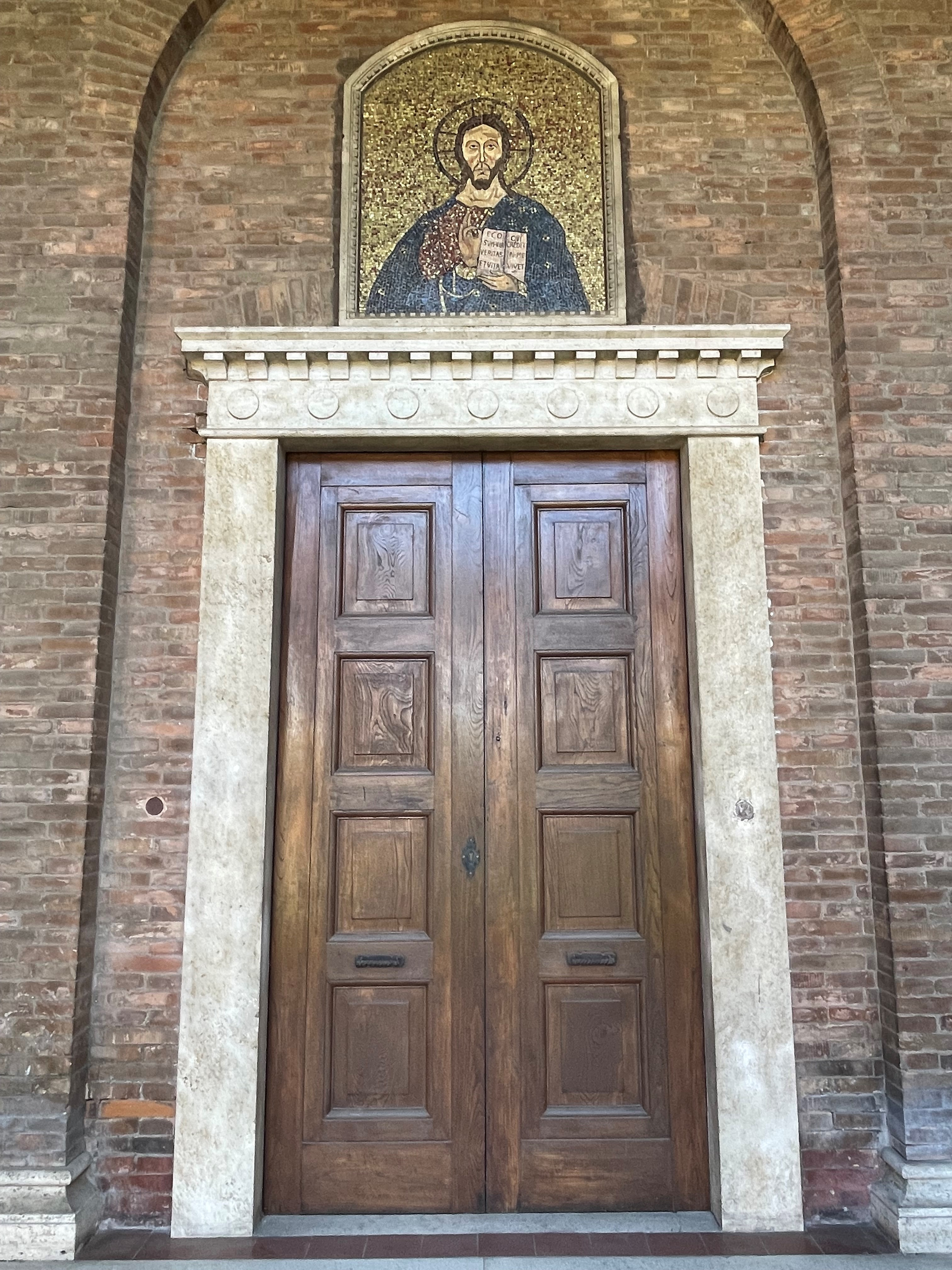

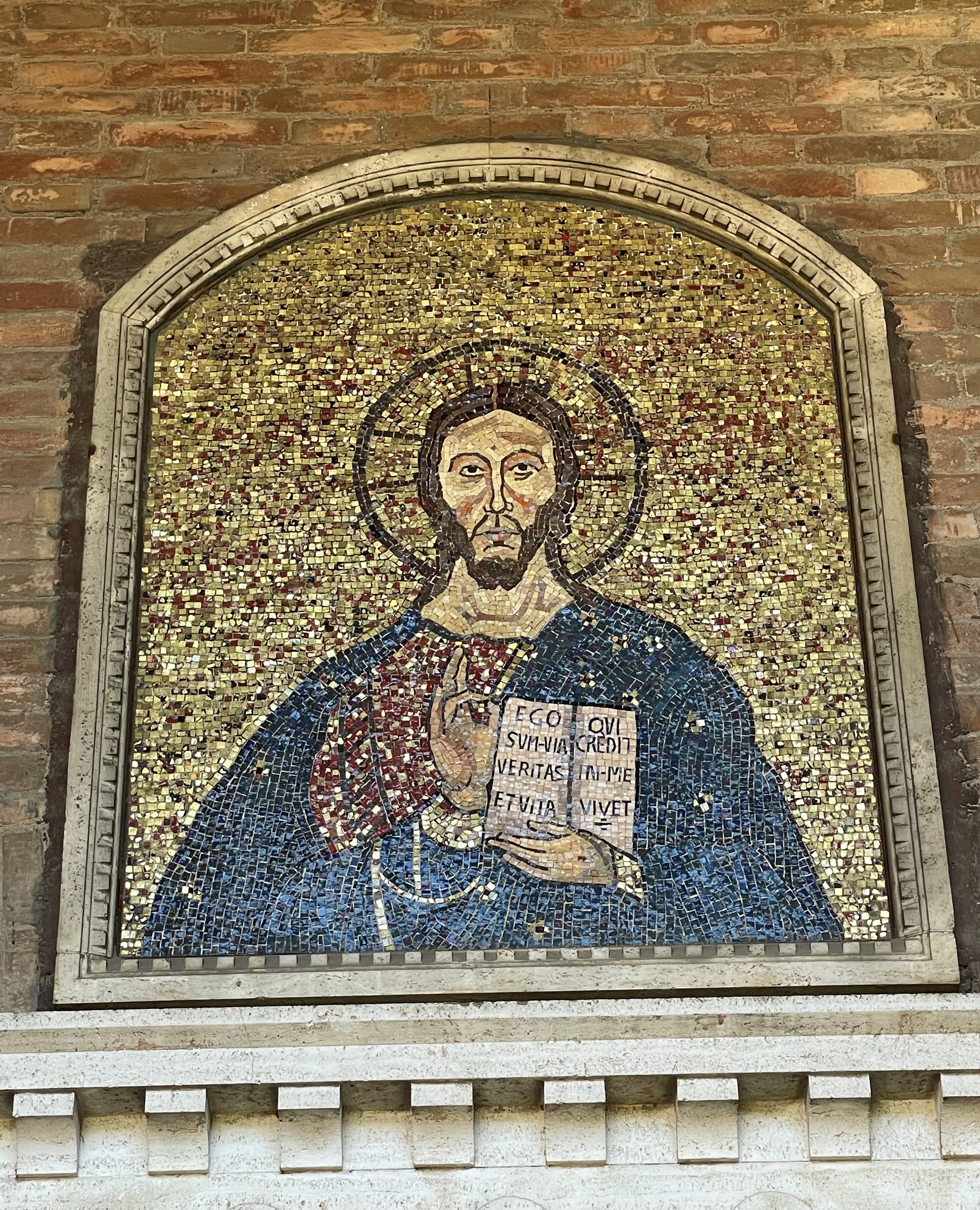

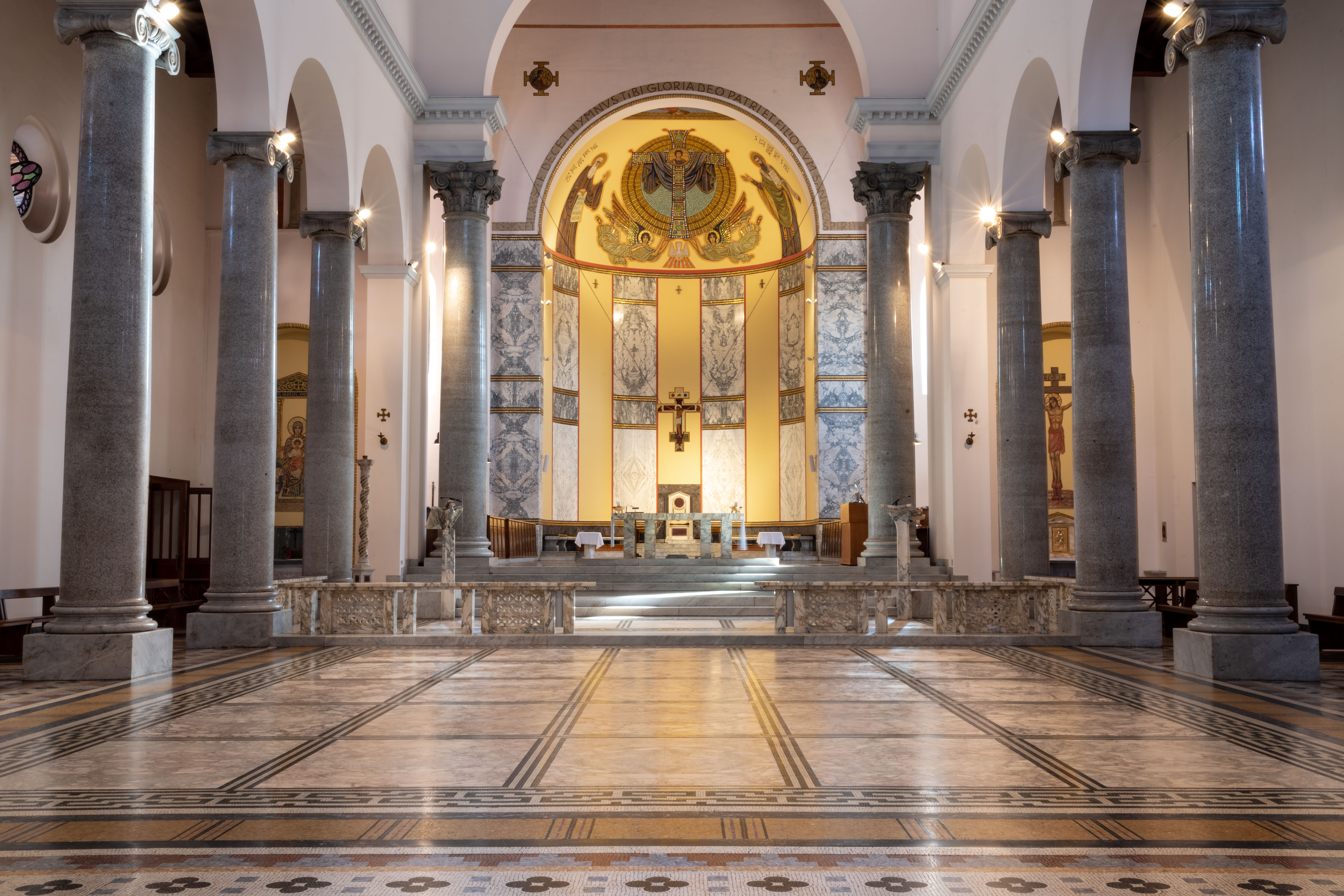

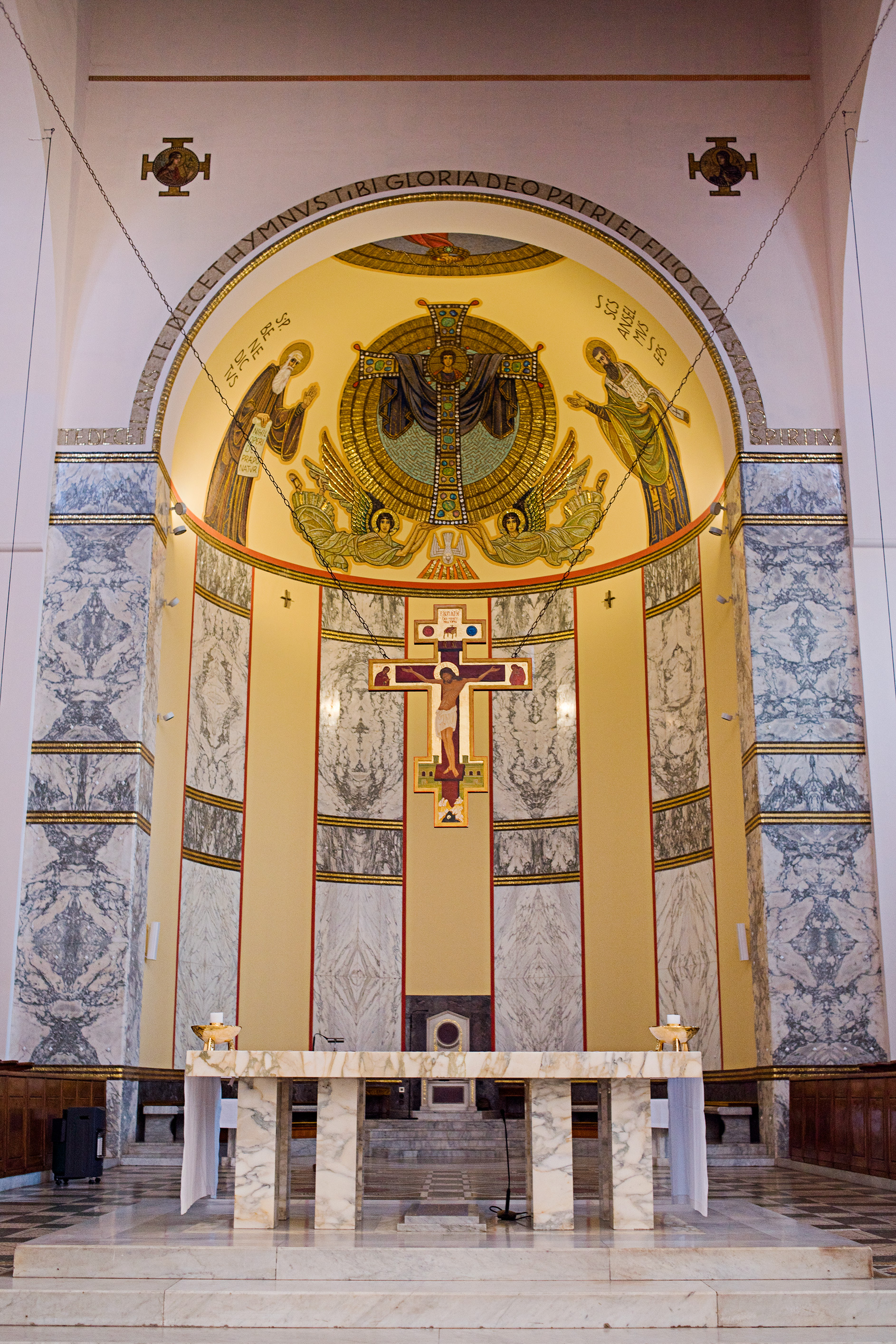

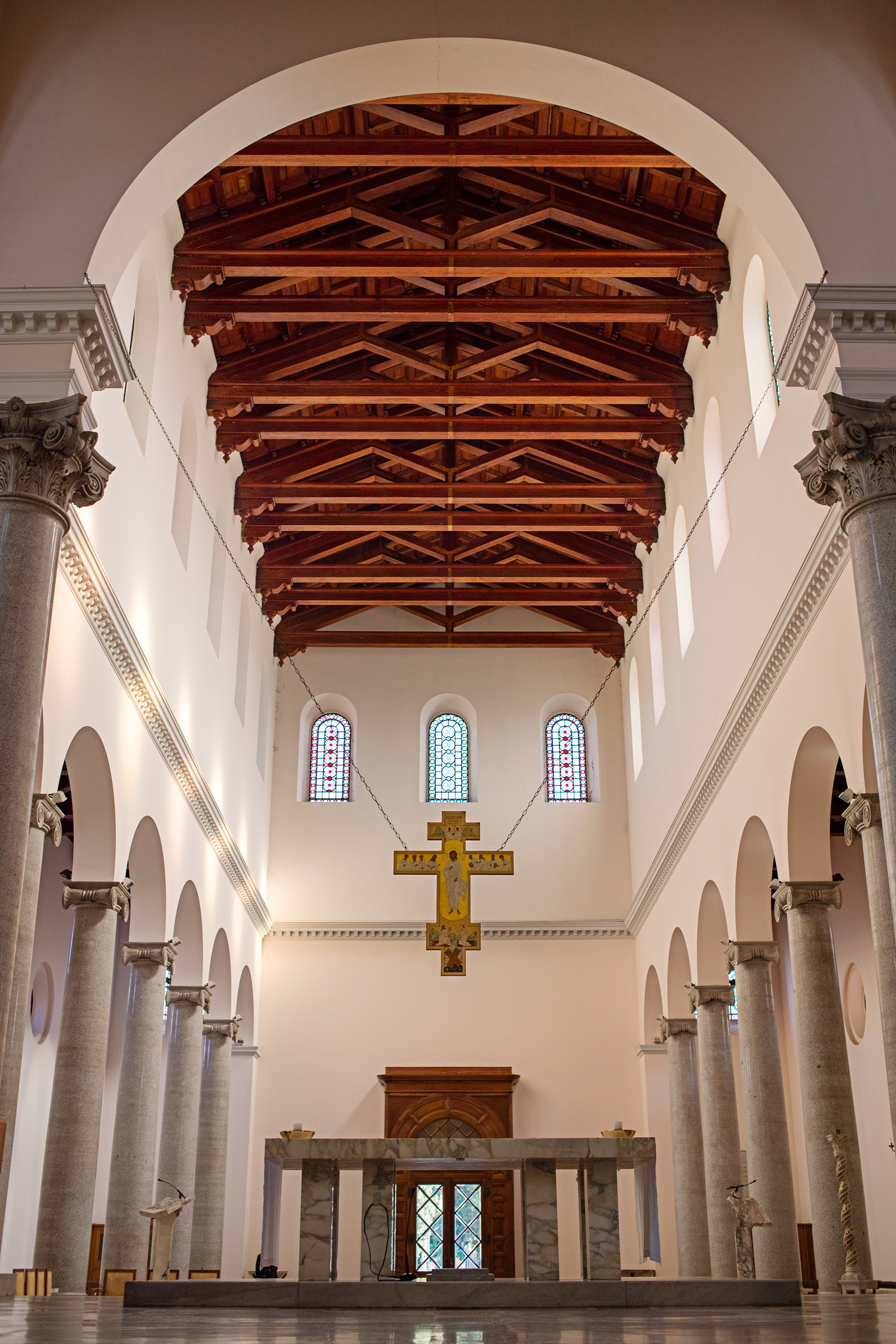

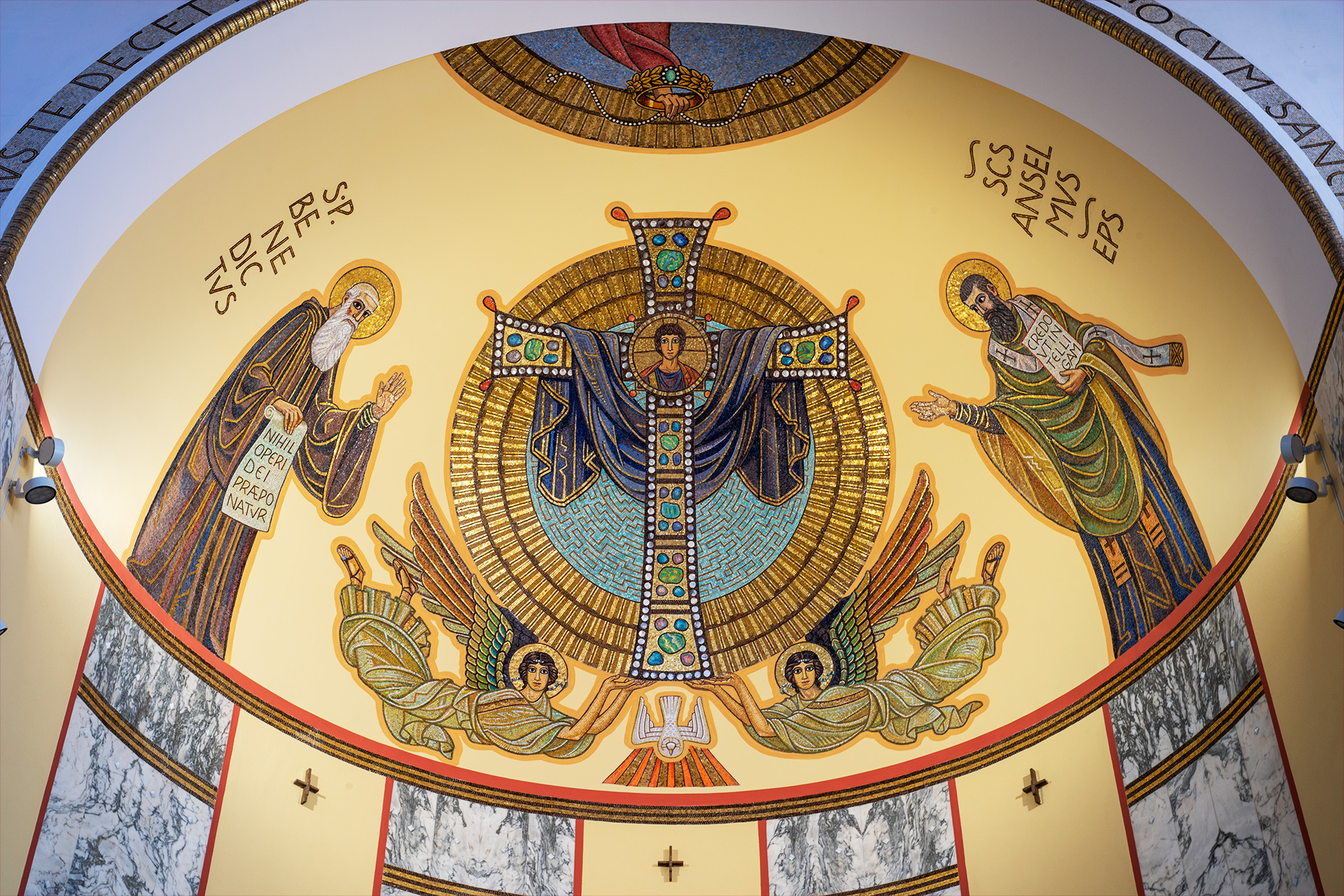

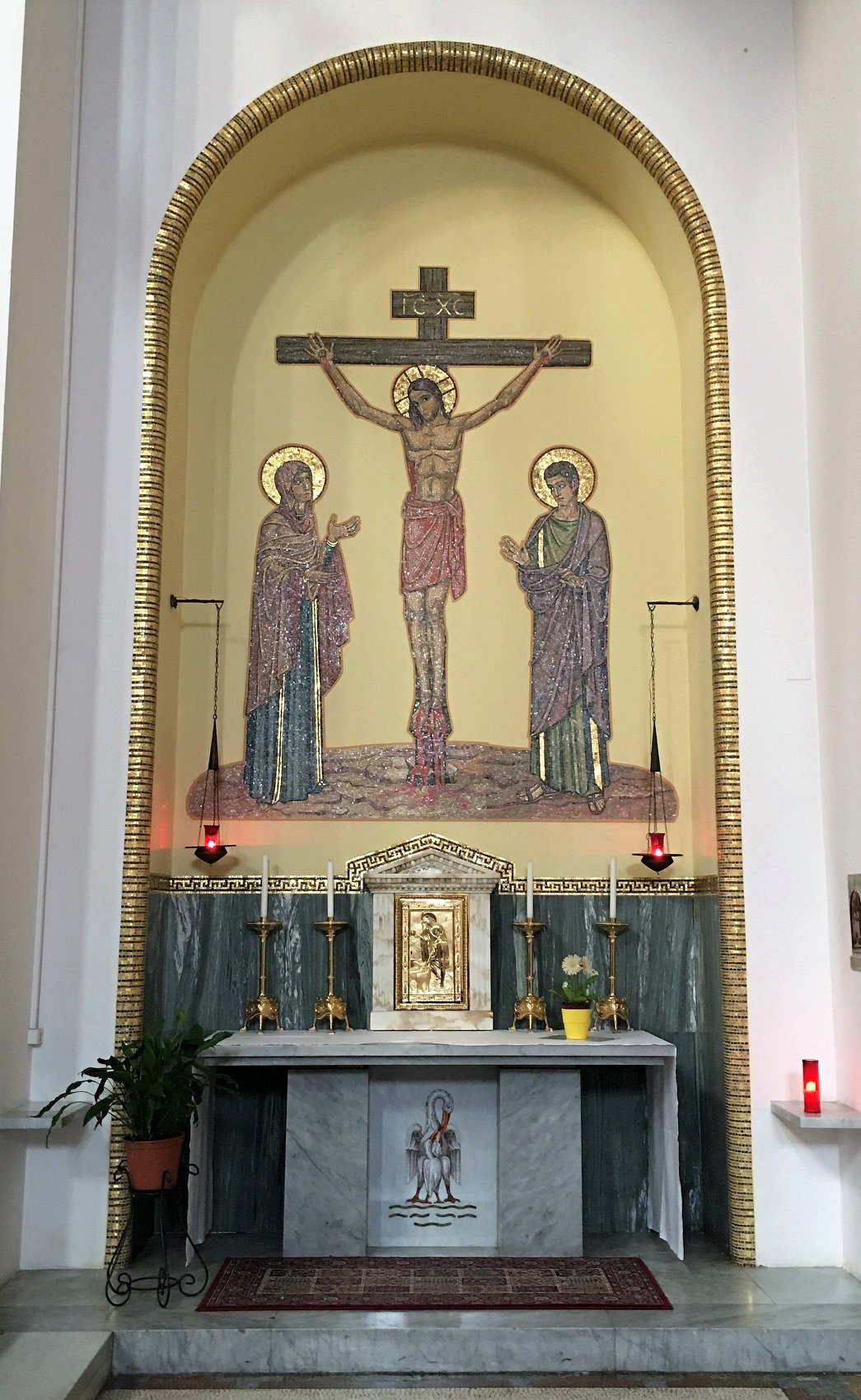

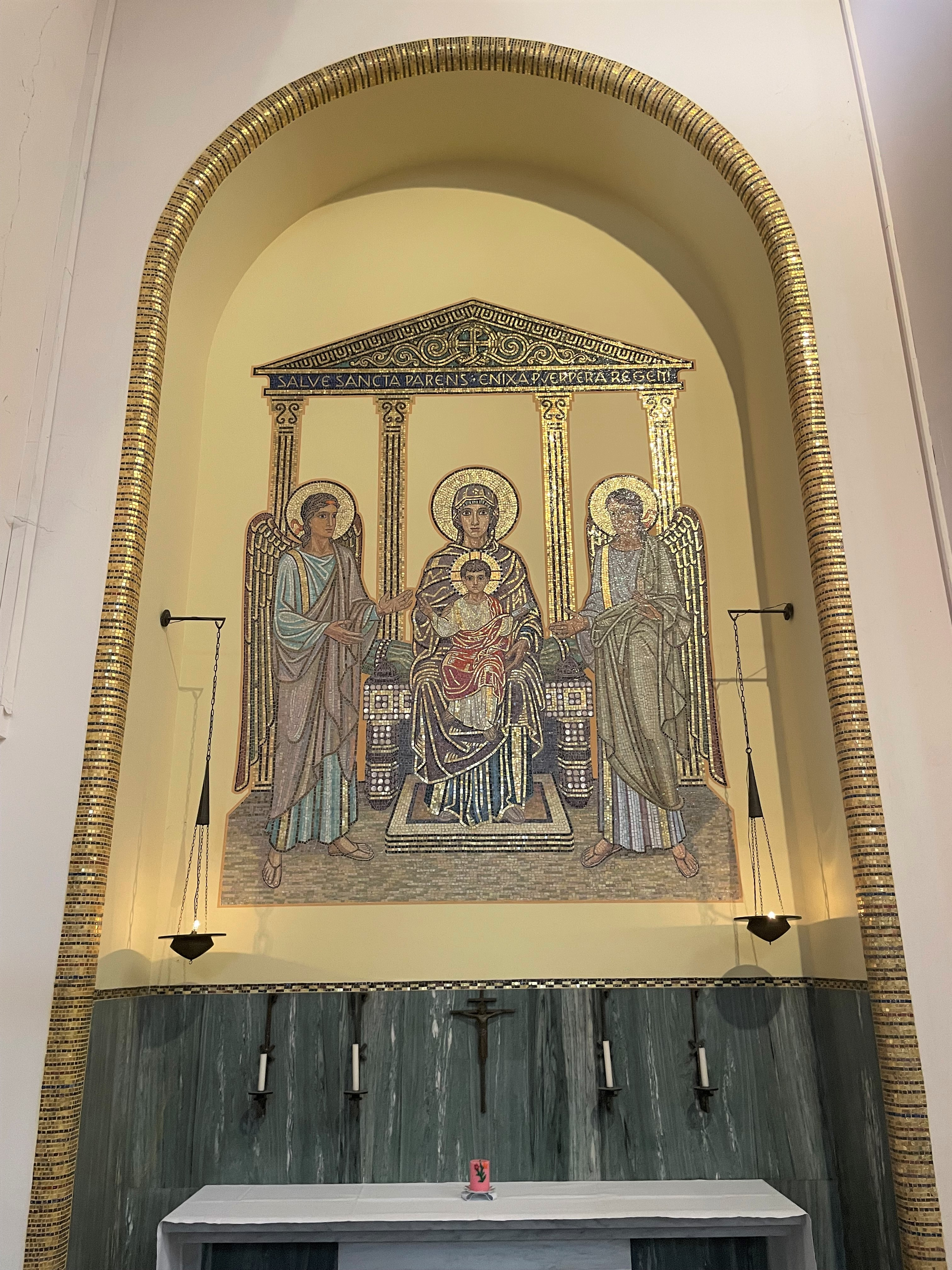

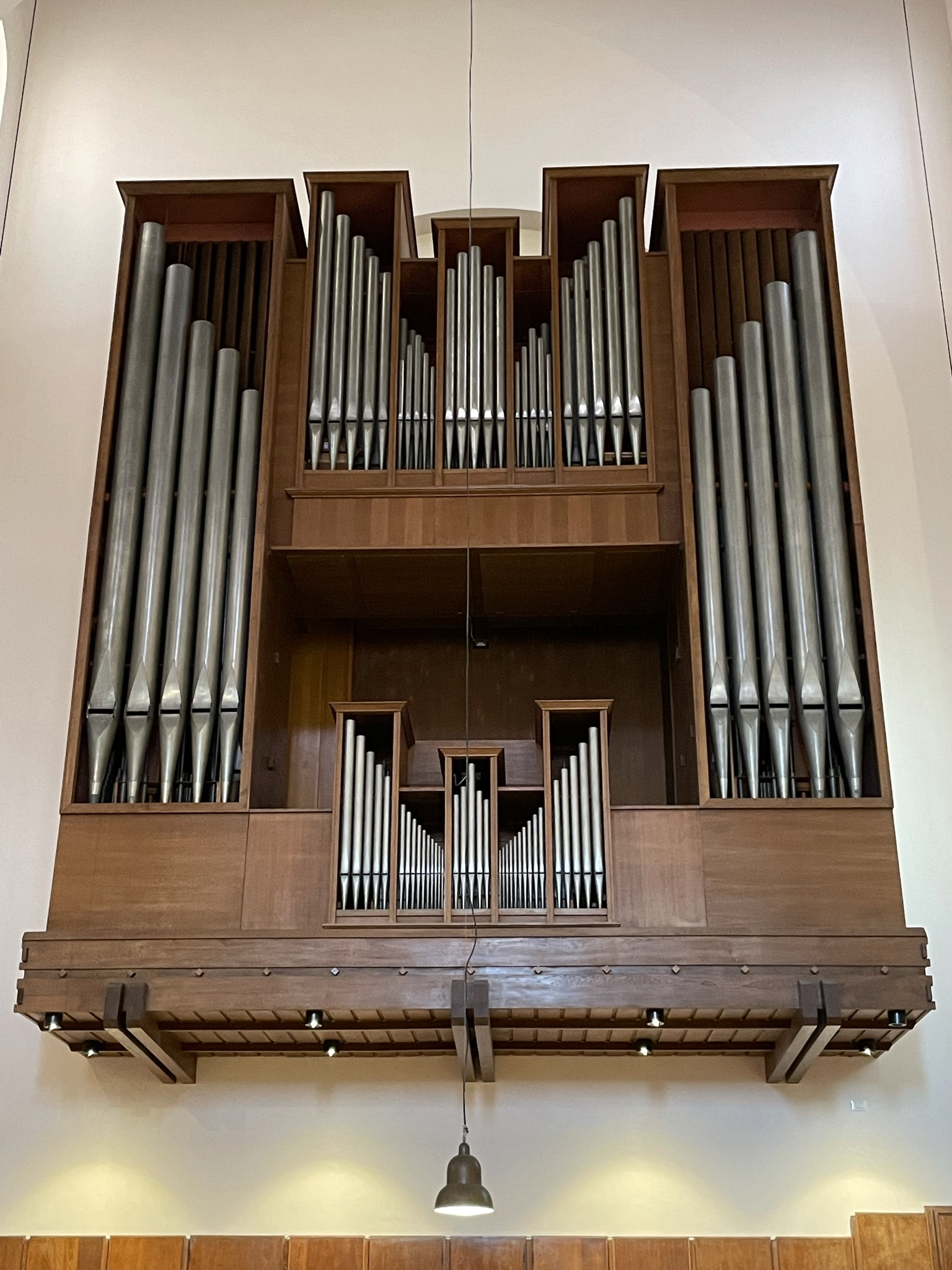

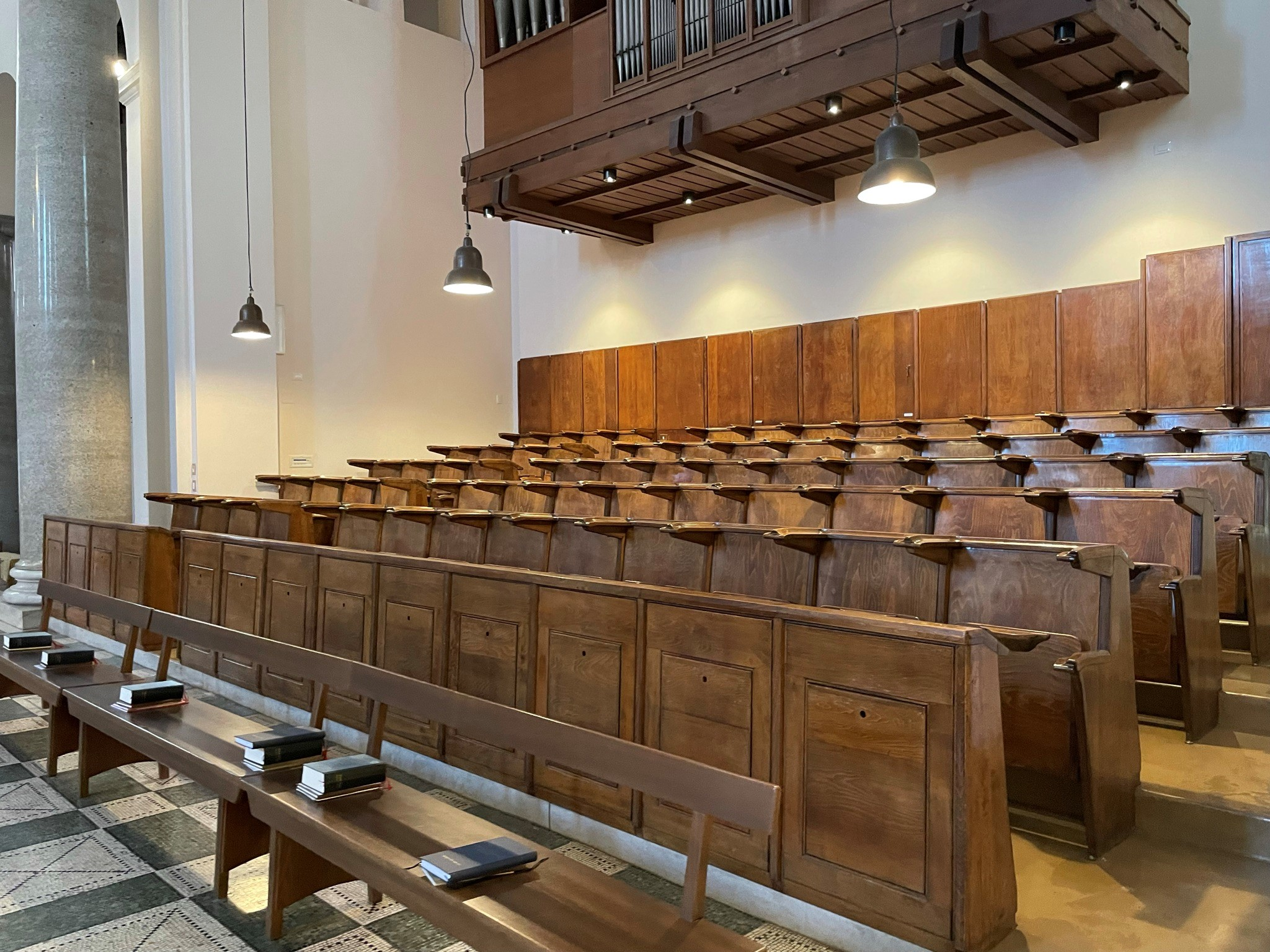

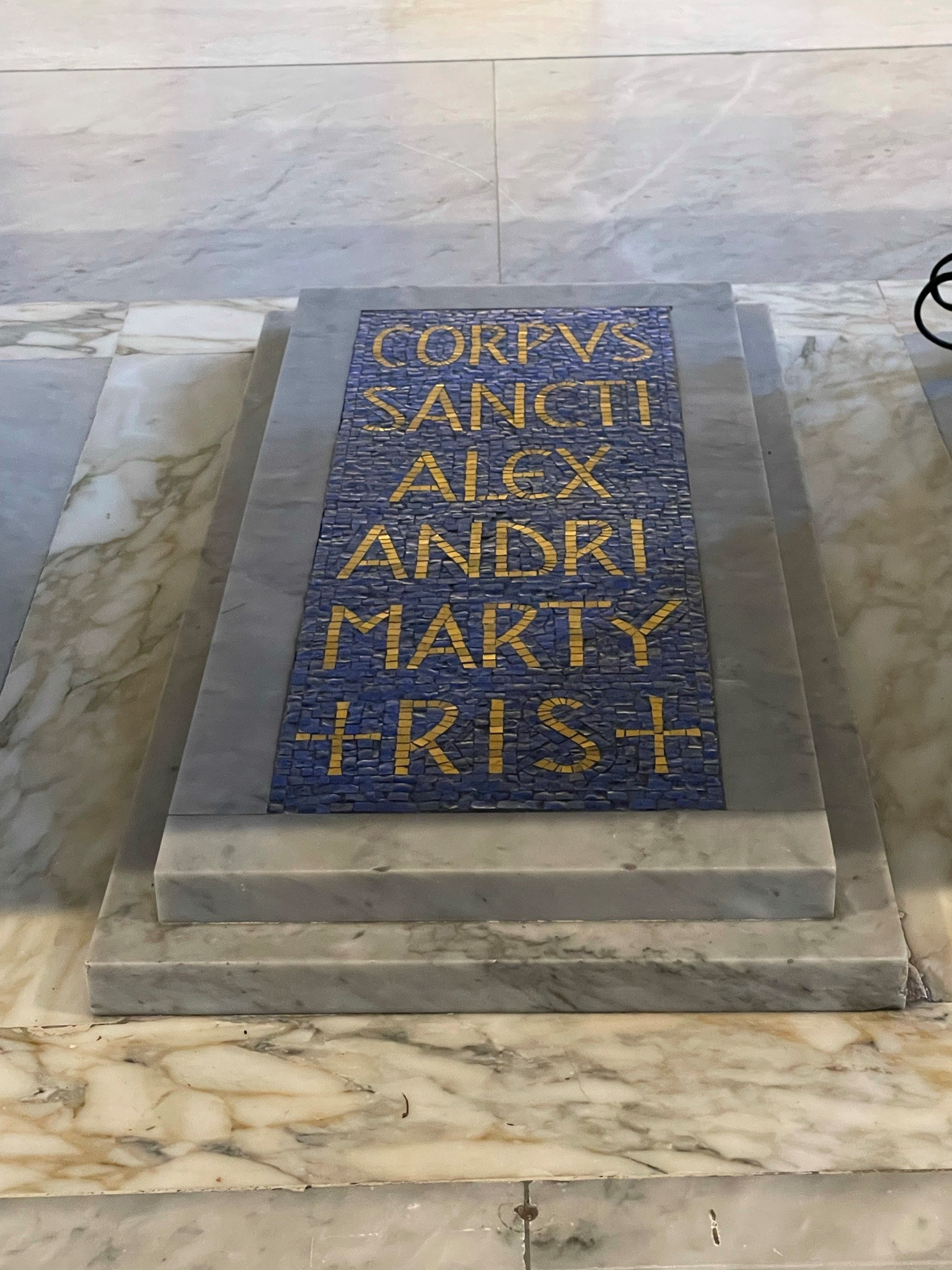

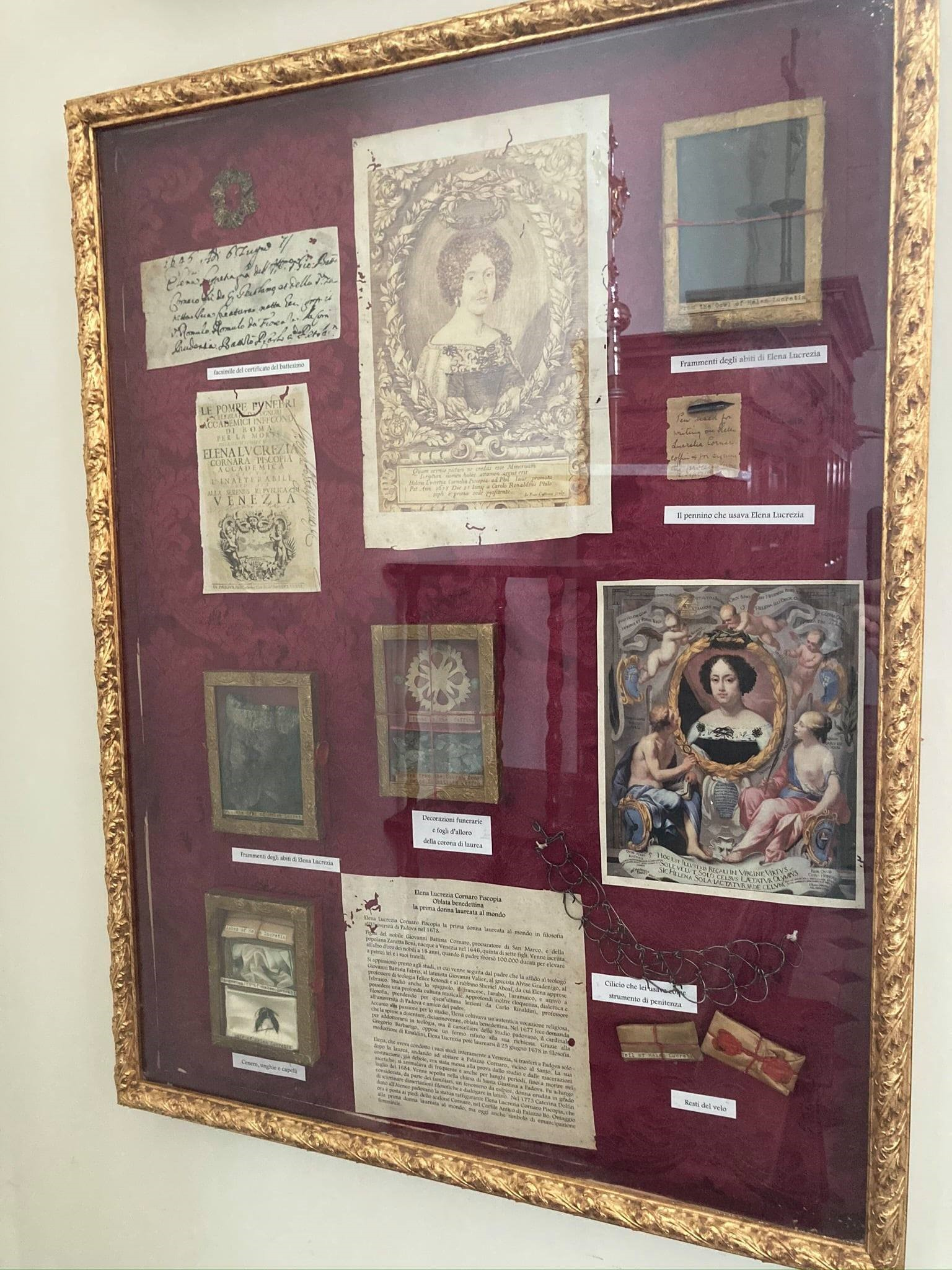

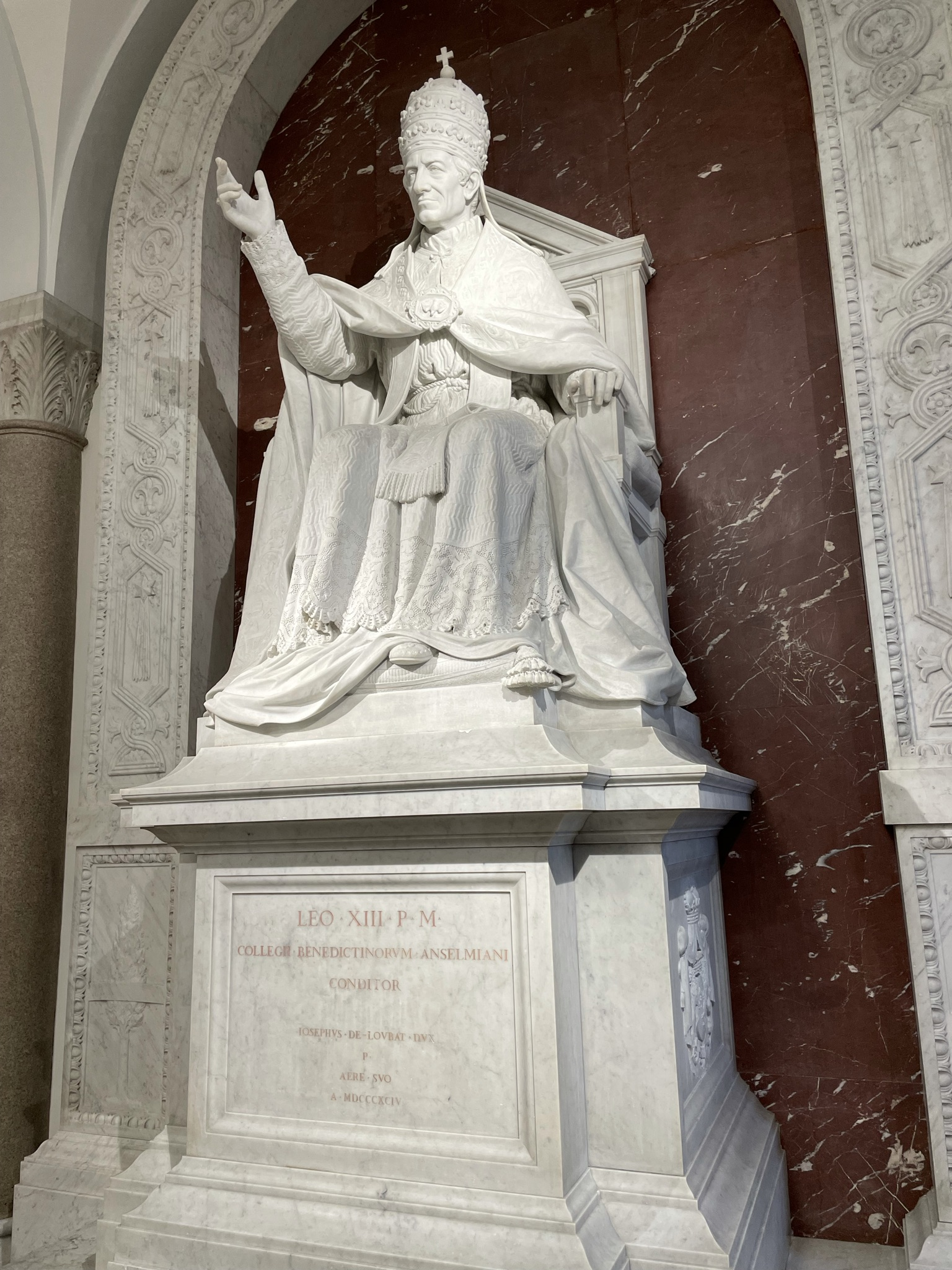

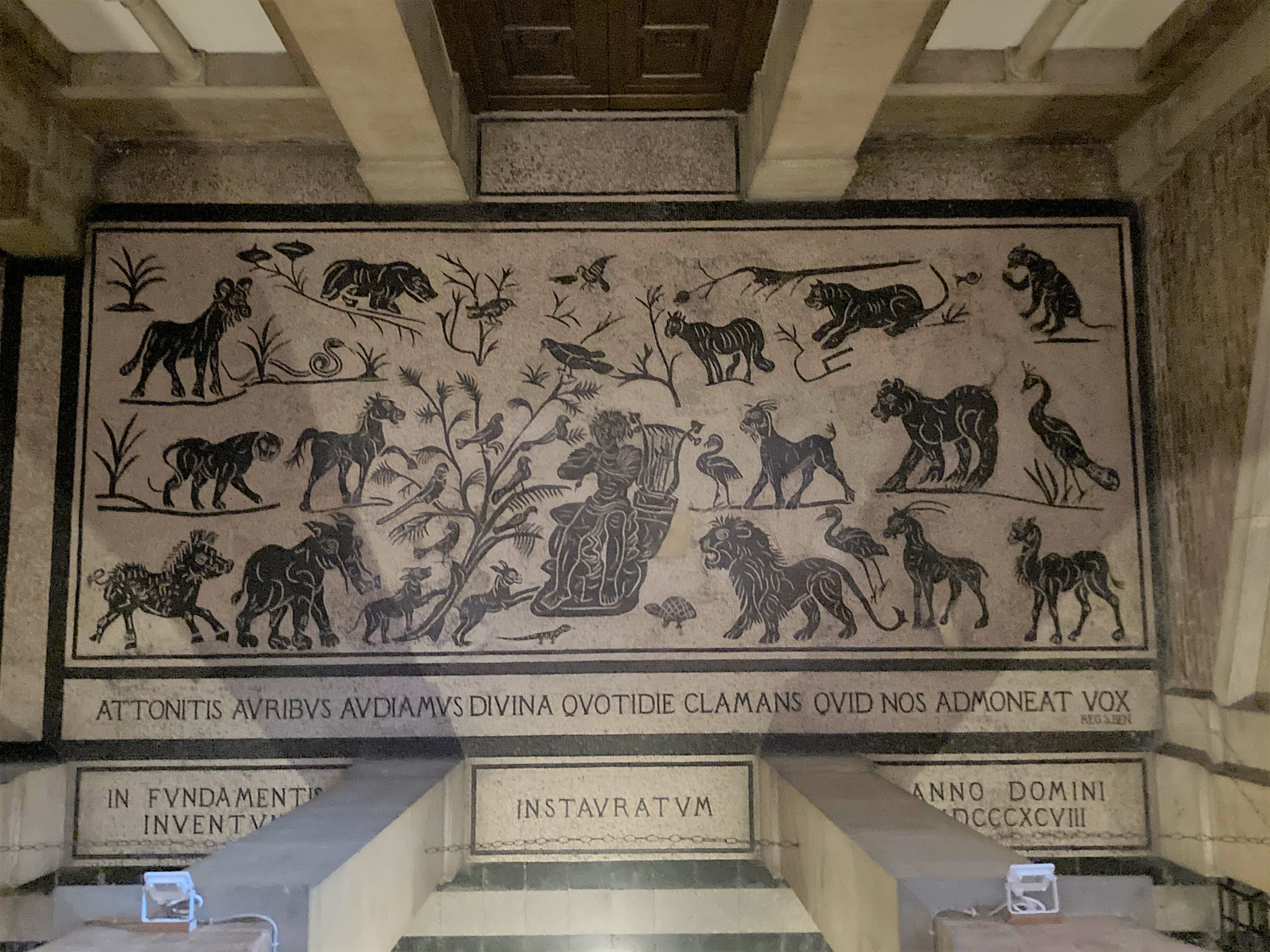

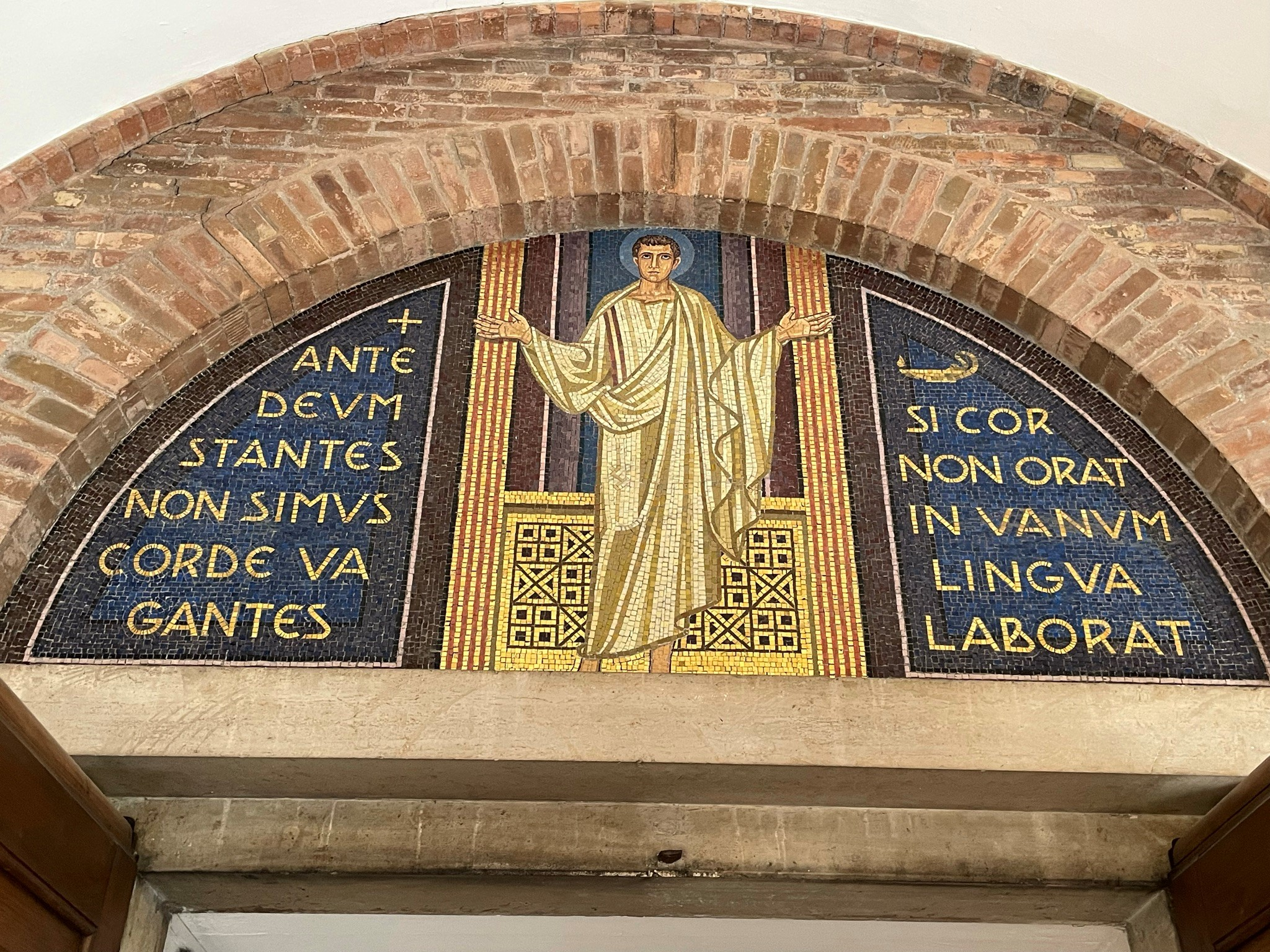

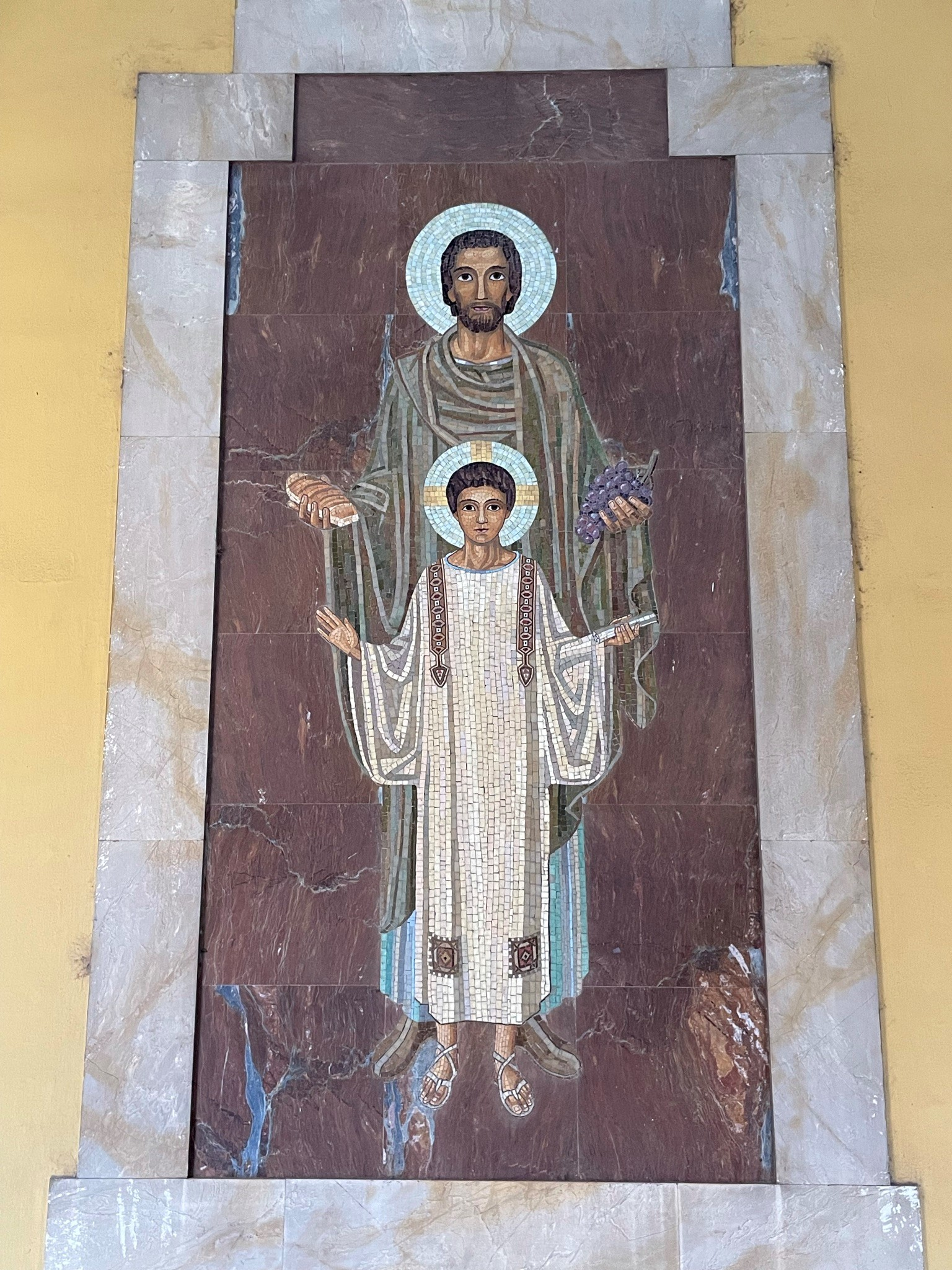

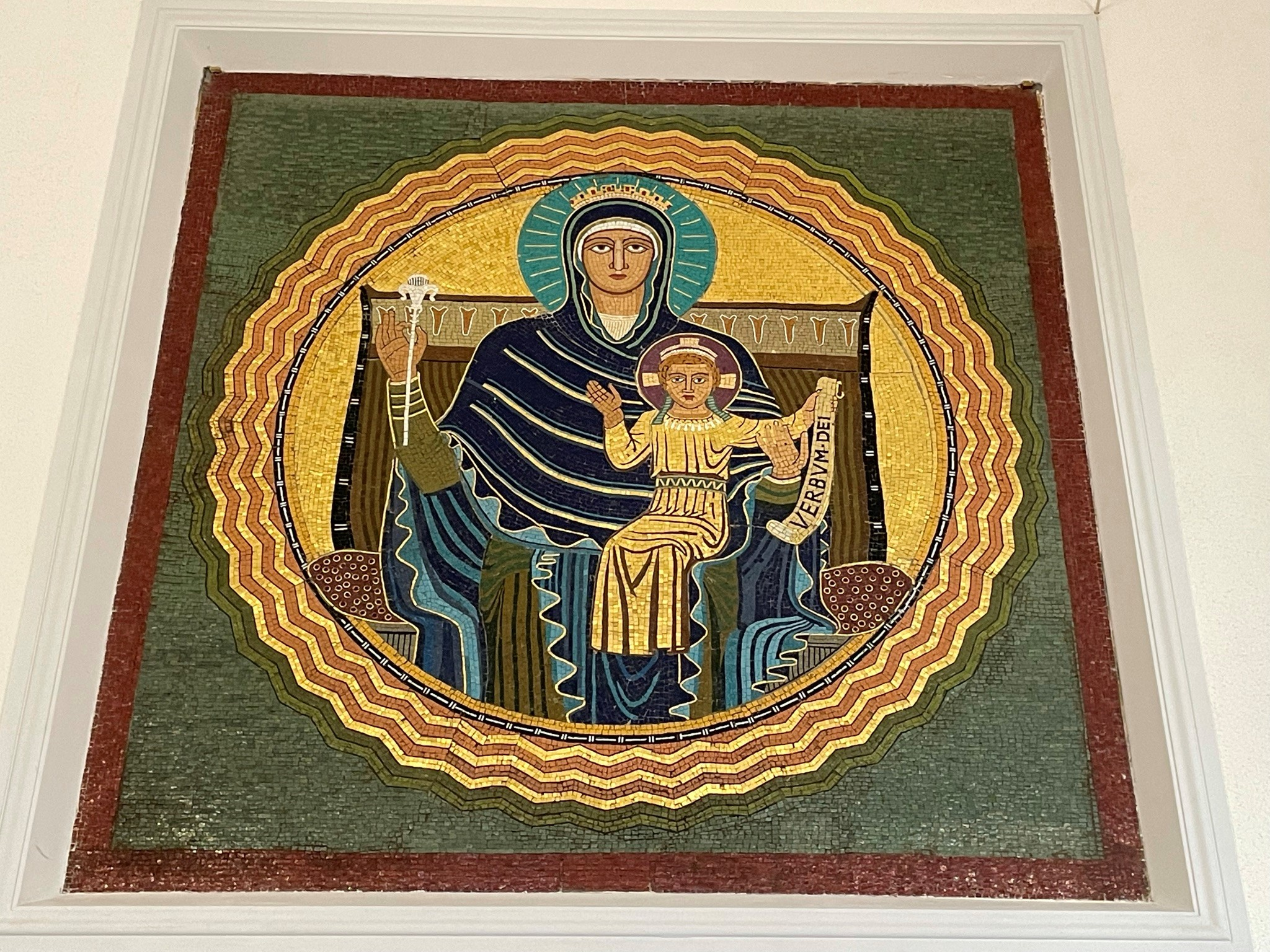

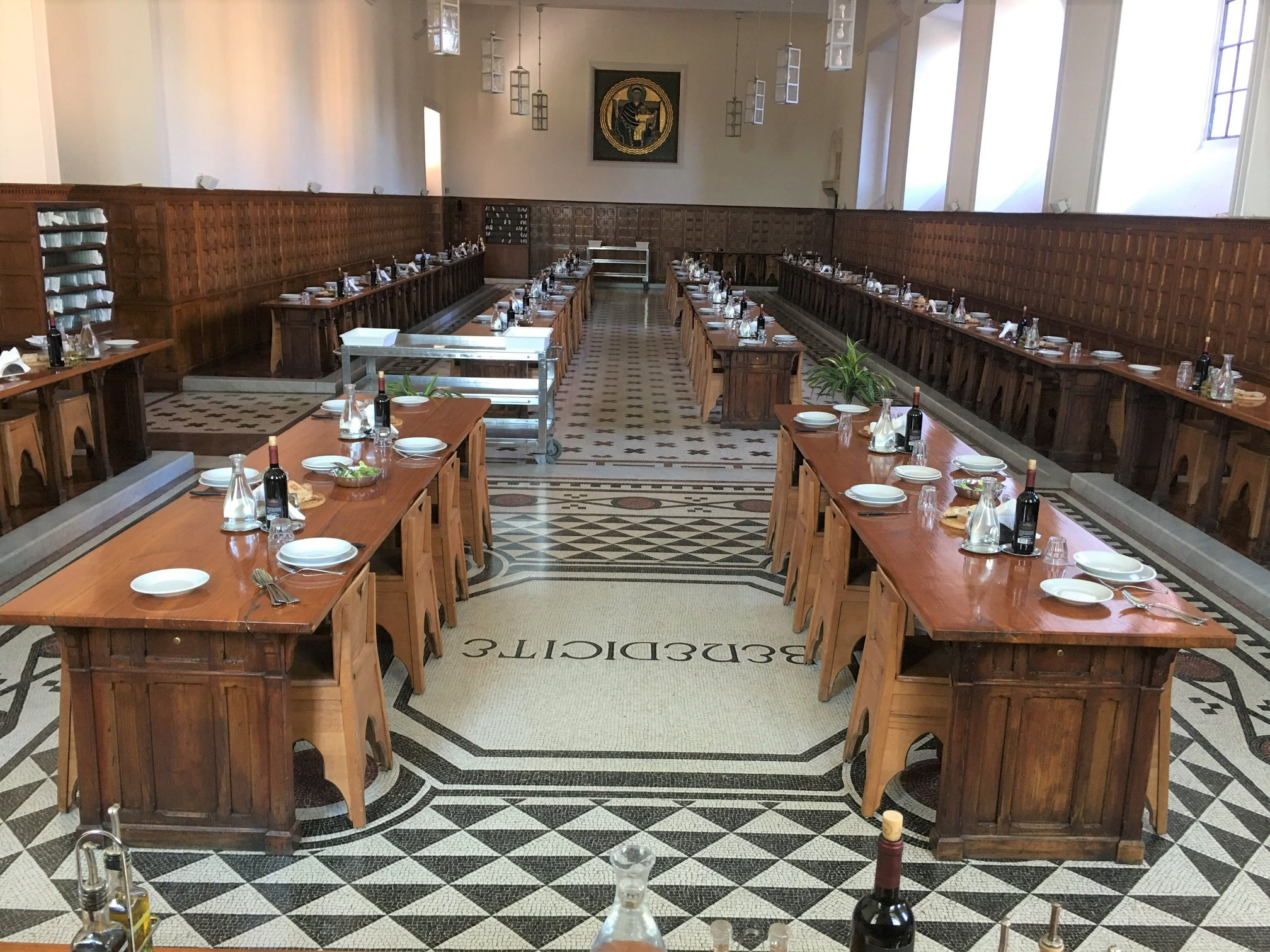

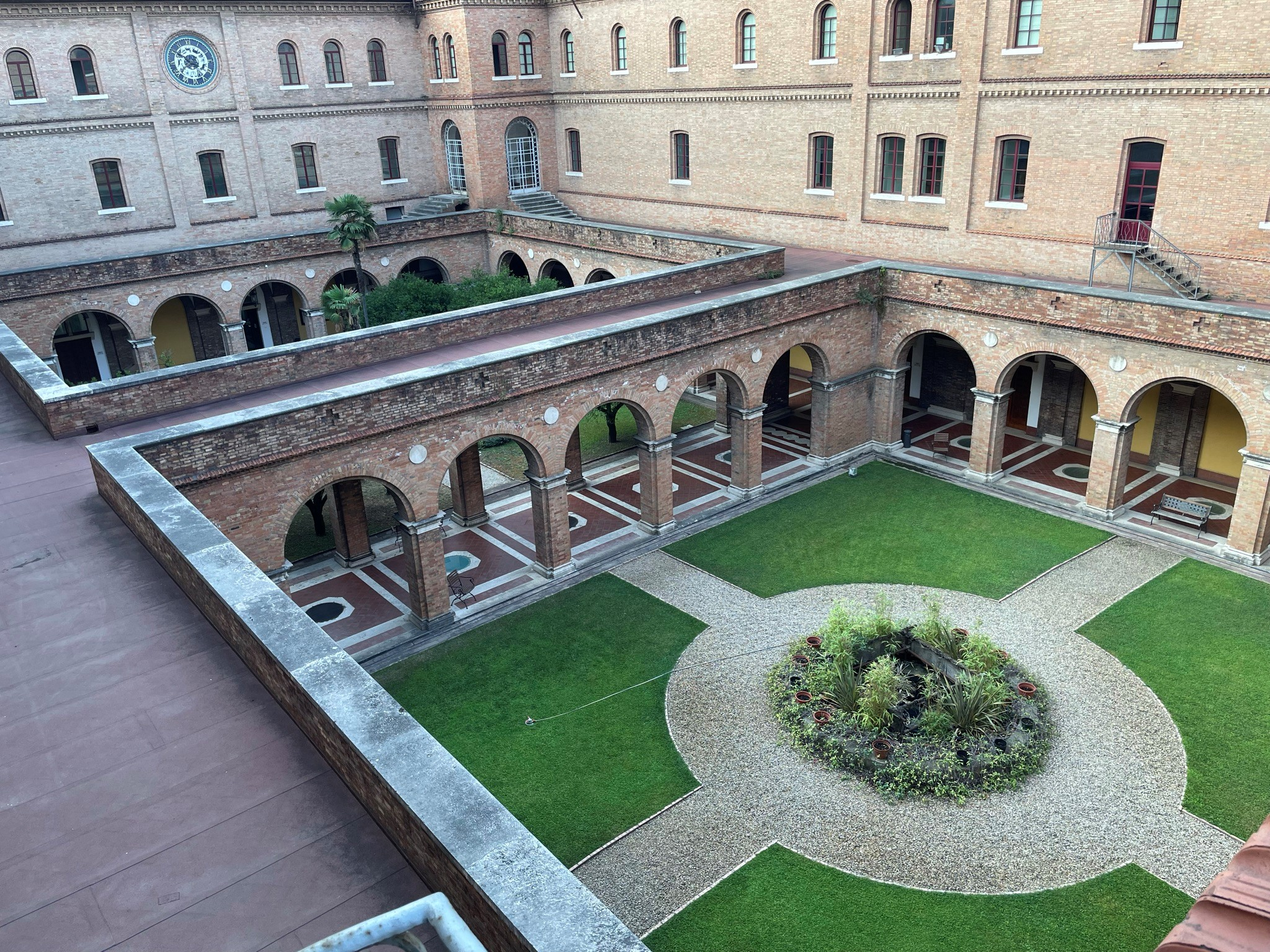
