= Mauritius Wilde =

German Benedictine monk, priest, author, and abbot

Right Reverend Mauritius Wilde OSB
- Abbot of Maria Laach Abbey
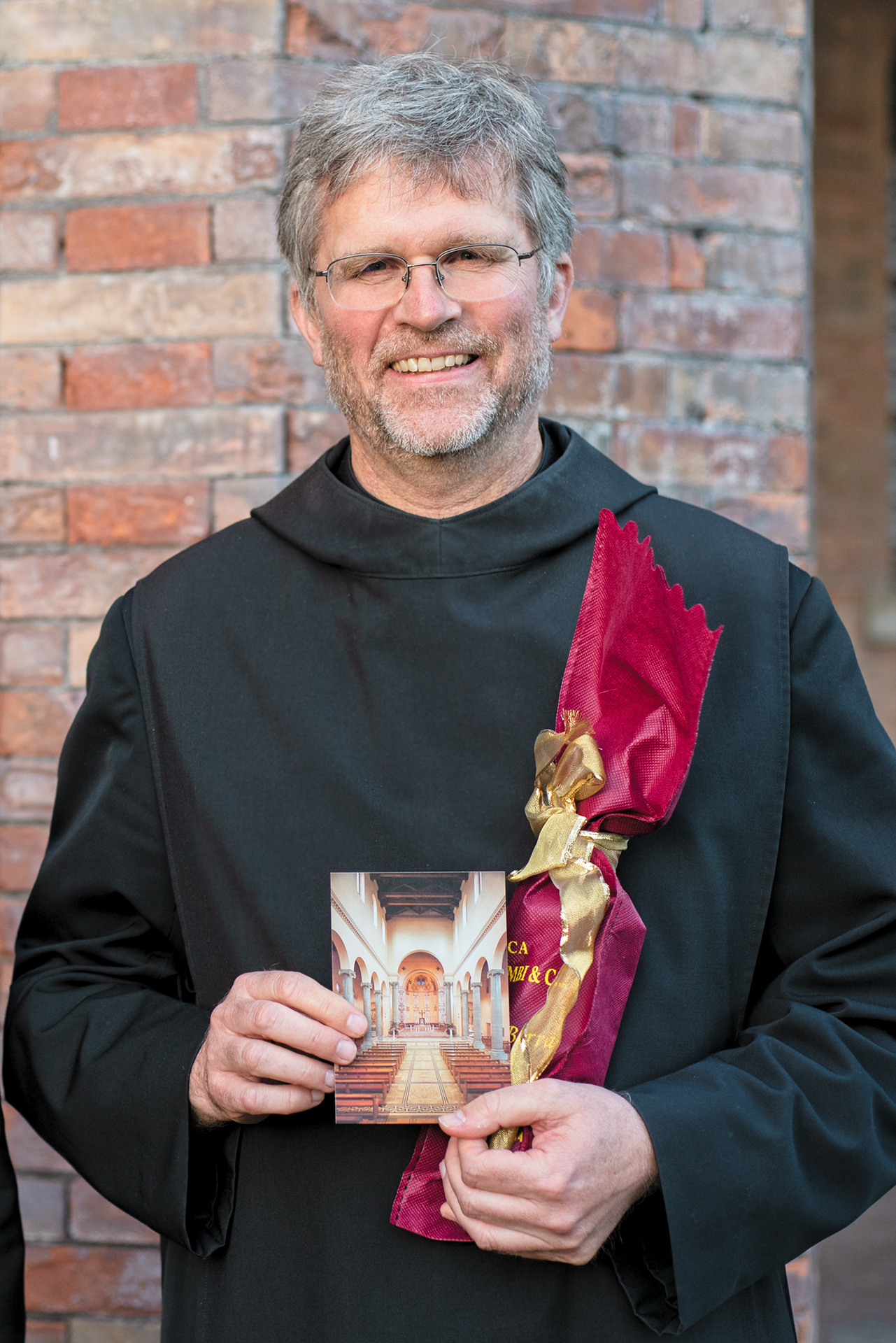
- Previous posts: Lecturer at the Pontifical Atheneum of Sant'Anselmo; Prior of the Primatial Abbey of Sant'Anselmo; Rector of the College of Sant'Anselmo; Prior of Christ the King Priory; Director of the Abbey Publishing House Vier-Türme-Verlag; Prefect in the Monastery Boarding School St. Egbert-Gymnasium

Orders
- Ordination: 27 July 2002 Münsterschwarzach Abbey

Personal details
- Born: Guntram Wilde; 27 October 1965 (age 60) Hildesheim, West Germany
- Denomination: Roman Catholic
- Residence: Rome, Italy
- Parents: Werner and Dr. Elfriede Wilde
- Education: Ph.D. 2000 University of Tübingen

Mauritius Wilde (born 27 October 1965) is a German Benedictine priest, monk, professor, podcaster, spiritual director, author, and abbot. He was appointed by the Holy See as the Abbot of Maria Laach Abbey. He was previously a member of Münsterschwarzach Abbey in Bavaria, which is part of the Benedictine Congregation of Saint Ottilien.

== Biography ==
=== Early life ===
Wilde was born in Hildesheim, Germany, to Werner and Dr. Elfriede (née Brunbauer) Wilde, and he has one older brother. He attended "Gymnasium Josephinum Hildesheim" from 1976 to 1985 before entering the Benedictine life.

=== Monastic Life ===
Wilde joined Münsterschwarzach Abbey at 19 years of age and was given at his monastic profession in 1990 the name "Mauritius" in honor of Saint Maurice. He would later study Philosophy and Theology at the Julius-Maximilians-Universität Würzburg receiving a diploma in 1992. He continued his theological studies at the University of Tübingen where he specialized in the German Dominican mystic Meister Eckhart and in 2000 received his Ph.D. with a dissertation entitled "Das Neue Bild vom Gottesbild. Bild und Theologie bei Meister Eckhart".

His first assignment was as a Prefect in the monastery's boarding school of St. Egbert-Gymnasium, but he also worked in youth ministry and vocations. He would later be appointed as director of the Abbey's publishing house known as "Vier-Türme-Verlag" serving from 1999 to 2010. In keeping with the missionary tradition of the Benedictine Congregation of Saint Ottilien, he would be assigned in 2011 as Prior of Christ the King Priory located in Schuyler, Nebraska, United States. During his time there he expanded his own missionary work through offering spiritual retreats, blogging, social media, and podcasting.

On 23 September 2016 Abbot Primate Gregory Polan of the Benedictine Confederation, appointed Wilde as the new Prior of the Primatial Abbey of Sant'Anselmo located in Rome, Italy. This appointment also made him the Rector of the College of Sant'Anselmo, which is an ecclesiastical residential college in the Roman tradition. The "Collegio Sant'Anselmo" serves as both a house of formation for Benedictines, but also as a residence for over one hundred monks from around forty countries, religious, diocesan priests, and lay people. It offers a monastic environment for those who study at the onsite Pontifical Athenaeum of Saint Anselm or at other Roman pontifical universities. Wilde would later be appointed to additionally serve as a lecturer and professor at the Pontifical Athenaeum of Saint Anselm, specializing in Spiritual Theology and the Rule of St. Benedict. Given his proficiency in German, Italian, and English, along with his expertise in spiritual theology and the use of digital media technology, he has also been called upon to offer spiritual commentaries through the international "Vatican News".

On 3 October 2025, Wilde was appointed by the Holy See as the Abbot of Maria Laach Abbey.

== Bibliography ==
=== Publications ===
Wilde has a number of publications in German, English, Italian, Croatian, and Spanish. Some of his publications include:

- Ich verstehe dich nicht: Die Herzensreise des kleinen Prinzen, Vier-Türme-Verlag (1994) (ISBN 978-3-87868-506-7) (in German)
- Das neue Bild vom Gottesbild: Bild und Theologie bei Meister Eckhart, Freiburger Universitätsverlag (2000) (ISBN 978-3-7278-1298-9) (in German)
- Der spirituelle Weg: Die Entwicklung des Benedikt von Nursia, Vier-Türme-Verlag (2001) (ISBN 3-87868-630-7) (in German)
- Petrus und Paulus. Wer in Gruppen entscheidet: die Unternehmer-Verwalter-Typologie, Vier-Türme-Verlag (2003) (ISBN 978-3-87868-284-4) (in German)
- Respekt, Die Kunst der gegenseitigen Wertschätzung, Vier-Türme-Verlag (2009; Revised edition 2020) (ISBN 978-3-7365-0307-6) (in German)
- Nüchternheit. Die Kunst, sich ein achtsames Herz zu bewahren, Vier-Türme-Verlag (2018) (ISBN 978-3-7365-0159-1) (in German)
- Be yourself!: the call of a Christian, Paulist Press (2019) (ISBN 978-0-8091-5331-2) (in English)
- Der Mönch in dir: Ein Weg zu Gelassenheit und Loslassen, Vier Türme (2024) (ISBN 978-3736505513) (in German)

=== Articles in journals ===
- Der sie bei Tag und Nacht verklagte..., Erbe und Auftrag (2019, vol. 4, pp. 375–386) (in German)
- Formation– Ideen, Institutionen, Erfahrungen (with David Forster, Bruno Rieder, Justina Metzdorf, Paulus Koci), Erbe und Auftrag (2020, vol. 2, pp. 164–178) (in German)
