= College of Sant'Anselmo =

Benedictine college in Rome, Italy

- Collegio Sant'Anselmo
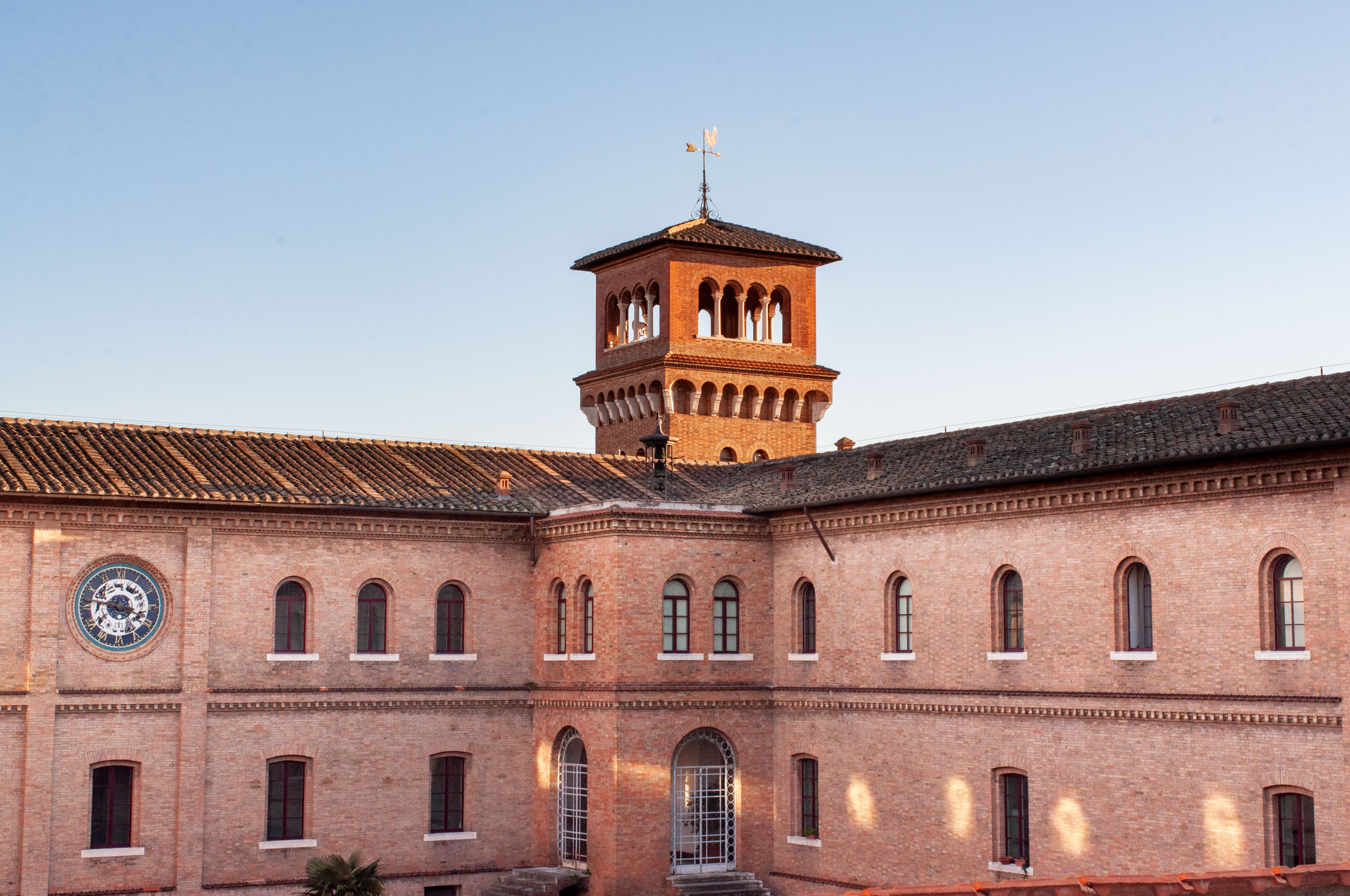

- Location in Rome College of Sant'Anselmo (Italy)
- 41°52′55.4268″N 12°28′41.4768″E
- Location: Piazza dei Cavalieri di Malta, 5; Rome; 00153
- Country: Italy
- Denomination: Roman Catholic
- Religious order: Benedictines
- Website: Collegio Sant'Anselmo

History
- Status: Ecclesiastical College
- Founded: January 4, 1887
- Founder: Pope Leo XIII

Administration
- Diocese: Rome

Clergy
- Abbot: Abbot Primate Jeremias Schröder, O.S.B.
- Rector: Rev. Brendan Coffey, O.S.B.

The College of Sant'Anselmo (Italian: Collegio Sant'Anselmo) is an international Benedictine college founded by Pope Leo XIII in 1887 and located in Rome, Italy. Situated on the Aventine Hill, it is one of four Benedictine institutions that occupy the complex known as "Sant'Anselmo all'Aventino" which serves as the Primatial Abbey (Italian: Badia Sant'Anselmo) of the Benedictine Confederation. As an ecclesiastical residential college in the Roman College tradition, it serves as both a house of formation for Benedictines, but also as a residence for over one hundred monks from around forty countries, religious, diocesan priests, and lay people. It offers a monastic environment for those who study at the onsite Pontifical Athenaeum of Saint Anselm or at other Roman pontifical universities.

== History ==
=== Benedictine Formation ===
Saint Benedict of Nursia (480-547) was a monk remembered mostly for his "Rule of Saint Benedict" completed before his death. Much larger stories of him come down to us through the writings of Pope Gregory the Great (540-604) who published four books of his "Dialogues" in 594. Book two of the Dialogues was entitled "Life and Miracles of Saint Benedict". We learn from both the Rule and the Dialogues of how important was the formation and continuing education of the monks in a monastery. In the prologue #45 to the Rule we find that Benedict wrote that he intended "to establish a school for the Lord's service". As noted by one author, "schola" is used in the Rule to refer to both the monastery, but also the whole group of people "who have come together for the common purpose specified by the Rule: to seek God, to imitate Christ, to obey his commands, to persevere in his teaching. Moreover, the education of a monk comes not just through studying even as that is important. Instead,

When Benedict speaks about the foot washing, his main concern is that we serve like Christ and serve Christ, the Lord, in another human person (cf. RB 35.9 and 53.13f). By being obedient, we obey Christ (in the person in front of us), and obey as Christ obeyed (cf. RB 5.56, 13).

Thus, integral to monastic formation is the understanding that a monastery forms its monks not just through formal education, studies and contemplative prayer, but also through service to others (liturgical, through manual labor, and through hospitality). As such, monasteries have traditionally formed their own monks at their own monasteries.

=== First College of Sant'Anselmo ===
By the early 15th century, the number of Benedictine monasteries connected with the Archabbey of Monte Cassino varied in membership from very small to very large. As such, a "Cassinese Benedictine Congregation" was formed in 1408 to affiliate those monasteries connected with the archabbey as a means of support and cooperation. One such endeavor was the need to offer training and formation of Benedictine monks to serve as professors and formators to individual monasteries, but to do so within a very specific monastic environment. Therefore, on March 22, 1687, Pope Innocent XI founded a "Collegio Sant'Anselmo" for students from the Cassinese Benedictine Congregation that would reside initially at the Palazzo San Callisto in Rome's Trastevere section, and then later at the Abbey of St. Paul Outside the Walls. The college was named in honor of the Benedictine monk Saint Anselm of Canterbury. Over the years the number of students at the "Collegio Sant'Anselmo" varied, but by the early 19th century few students remained and the college dissolved. By 1885, Pope Leo XIII began to envision a refoundation of the college but with a renewed emphasis on it accepting students from Benedictine abbeys around the world and not just from the Cassinese Benedictine Congregation. On January 4, 1887, Pope Leo XIII issued a papal brief ("Quae diligenter") that formally commissioned the re-establishment of an international residential college in Rome to serve all Benedictine abbeys of the world.

=== Second College of Sant'Anselmo ===
Housing for the reestablished "Collegio Sant'Anselmo" would become a critical challenge so the Benedictines began a search for more permanent accommodations. The college found its first and temporary location in a part of the Palazzo dei Convertendi on the Piazza Borgo Vecchio. Archbishop Giuseppe Benedetto Dusmet, O.S.B. had been entrusted by Pope Leo XII with the refoundation of the college and the first day began with only fourteen students. Soon, others would begin arriving from monasteries throughout the world including a total of seven Benedictine professors and five lay brothers. The college would be led by Abbot Gaetano Bernardi from Monte Cassino with his Prior being Fr. Adalbert Miller from Saint Vincent Archabbey.

From the autumn of 1893 to 1896 the college moved to a house at the Via della Bocca di Leone 68, close to the Piazza di Spagna. Construction would begin in 1892 on a complex located on the Aventine Hill that would serve as a permanent home for the college, as well as house other Benedictine institutions. Finally, in October 1896, the college (then composed of fifty-five students, seven professors, and five lay brothers) moved to its newly constructed residence at "Sant'Anselmo all'Aventino".

==== Early years ====
After the move to the Aventine Hill, the number of college residents continued to grow. To the abbots of the world who were sending their monks, one vital importance was the "monastic character" of the college. Even in the midst of students needing to study, the abbots wanted to ensure that monastic customs were maintained: daily communal prayer and mass, private prayer/meditation, monastic service, and silence in the house. Sant'Anselmo had been founded not as a monastery, but as "an institute of higher studies" with a distinctive "monastic character". This would be the challenge over the next 100 years as to how to balance what were seemingly competing goals to the life at Sant'Anselmo. As one author noted, "the main purpose of Sant'Anselmo was and remained the training of young Benedictines in philosophy and theology".

By 1914 at the start of the first world war, the college had eleven professors, seventy-five Benedictine students, six Cistercians, one Camaldolese, and one Olivetan. All the manual labor was completed by sixteen lay brothers who were mostly from the Beuronese Congregation. On June 24, 1914, Pope Pius X issued a Motu proprio that formally granted Sant'Anselmo the right to confer doctoral decrees in Philosophy, Theology, and Canon Law with equal status to the other pontifical universities in Rome.

==== War years ====
The war years brought great challenges to the college as monasteries -especially those from countries in direct conflict- struggled to get their students to the college. During the first world war, the Benedictines had been entrusted by the Vatican with the work on the new edition of the Latin Vulgate along with a continuing outreach to the ecumenical movement with the East. Some students had to return to their home countries as they were drafted into the war efforts. Likewise, the Italian government began to transform schools into military hospitals and Sant'Anselmo was no exception. The college was used as a war hospital from September 1916 to July 1919.

The period before the second world war saw a flourishing of studies and monastic life at Sant'Anselmo, but a struggle for professors and finances. There was an especially renewed interest by Fr. Lambert Beauduin to recommit to Pope Leo XIII's original vision of Benedictines as a bridge to the Eastern Churches. This would ultimately lead to Beauduin's founding of Chevetogne Abbey in Belgium. These post war years would also see the "International College of Sant'Anselmo (Collegium Internationale S. Anselmi de Urbe)" welcome for the first time not only students of other religious orders, but also diocesan clerics.

During the second world war, great efforts were made to ensure no national factions developed amongst the students. This is where the monastic practice of dividing the larger community into smaller "deaneries" became so very important even as they are today. No one language group would predominate even as the hope was that students would also learn other languages and about other cultures. Nonetheless, students would face difficulties as their home monasteries were closed, some were drafted into the war efforts of their countries, and tensions would rise. One visiting monk, Fr. Hermann Keller from the Archabbey of Beuron, was also found to be working for the German Gestapo but was transferred to Paris. Further challenging the students was the sudden death in 1942 of Fr. Anselm Stolz of Gerleve Abbey who had served as an internationally famous monk and professor. Finally, in October 1943, the monastic community of the Archabbey of Monte Cassino, along with their archives and artwork, were transferred to Sant'Anselmo before the final destruction of that monastery.

==== Post war years ====
The years after the second world war saw the college once again flourishing, along with major renovations of the buildings, church, and grounds of Sant'Anselmo. By 1939 there were eighty-six Benedictine students and sixty students from outside the monastic community. In May 1952, the Abbot Primate also established the Monastic Institute (Latin: Studiorum Monasticorum Institutum) a part of the Department of Theology in an effort to further the teaching of Benedictine formators. Finally, on June 17, 1961, the Pontifical Institute of Liturgy (Latin: Pontificium Institutum Liturgicum) was formally established with its opening on December 9, 1961, and the appointment of Fr. Salvatore Marsili as its first moderator.

Further changes were made in 1966 by the Congress of Abbots which saw the separation of the "Collegio Sant'Anselmo" from the "Pontifical Athenaeum of Saint Anselm" to function as two separate institutions, a later acceptance of women as students in the university, as well as the change from lectures in Latin to lectures in Italian. The further lack of lay brothers saw the employment of lay employees to handle most of the manual labor.

==== Present ====
The "Collegio Sant'Anselmo" is described as a "collegium monasteriale". In the words of one author:

These two words are intended to express the fact that Sant’Anselmo, as a Benedictine college, resembles a monastery and is not merely a house of studies. Nor is it a seminary, of which there are many. It is, rather, an international community of professors, officials, and students who follow a monastic rhythm of life to the extent that this is reconcilable with the main objective of the house, which is studies.

As an ecclesiastical residential college, it is distinct from others in its "monastic character" shown in certain communal exercises. Above all, there is the daily choral celebration of the Opus Dei and Mass where residents are assigned to serve in various liturgical roles. Likewise, in contrast with other religious houses in Rome, there are servers at the common meals at midday and in the evening. The washing of dishes after these meals is also expected as residents take turns to perform each of these services.

Breakfast follows the monastic tradition of being taken in silence. At lunch one may talk, which allows for the residents from around the world to get to know each other. For five days of the week, supper takes place without conversation but with either public reading or recorded music during the meal. Self-service meals with talking takes place regularly only on Sunday evenings and Wednesday evenings.

For the choral communal prayers, at 6:20 a.m. Lauds and Mass are celebrated in Italian followed by breakfast. The midday office (Ora Media) begins at 12:50 pm and consists of a Latin hymn, one or two psalms sung in Latin, a short reading in Italian, followed by a concluding prayer in Latin. Lunch then follows with choral meal prayers at table both before and after eating. Vespers is chanted in Latin at 7:15 p.m. by all in the church, followed by Supper with choral meal prayers at table both before and after eating. Compline is chanted in Latin at 8:30 p.m. to end the day. On Sundays and major feasts, Lauds is chanted in Latin at 6:50 a.m. with conventual Mass in Italian following at 9:00 A.M.

Thus, Benedictines seeking further studies are encouraged to study in Rome because the presence of the college provides a unique gift of living at an ecclesiastical residential college with a distinctive "monastic character". Rooms are also available to other religious, diocesan priests, and lay people who are studying at the Pontifical Athenaeum of Saint Anselm or at other Roman pontifical universities.

== Rectors of the Collegio Sant'Anselmo ==
The Abbot Primate of the Benedictine Confederation serves as Abbot of the Primatial Abbey of Sant'Anselmo (Italian: Badia Sant'Anselmo) and appoints a Benedictine monk as Prior. This Prior also serves as the Rector of the college. Historically, the Rector of the Collegio was also the Rector of the Athenaeum until the responsibilities were divided. Today, the role of the Rector for Collegio Sant'Anselmo is to: accept students who seek to apply to the college, ensure the formation of candidates to the priesthood according to the Vatican norms as established in the "Ratio fundamentalis", and to represent the Collegio to the Vatican Congregation for the Clergy. Listed below are the Rectors of the "Collegio Sant'Anselmo" since the division of responsibilities, their years of service, and their home abbey:

- 1967-1974 Rev. Ambroise Watelet (Maredsous Abbey)
- 1974-1979 Rev. Dominic Milroy (Ampleforth Abbey)
- 1979-1983 Rev. Gellért Békés (Pannonhalma Abbey)
- 1983-1992 Rev. Mark Sheridan (St. Anselm's Abbey, Washington, DC)
- 1992-1993 Rev. Marcel Rooney "Pro-Prior" (Conception Abbey)
- 1993-1997 Rev. Bonifaz Klingler (Muri-Gries Abbey)
- 1997-2004 Rev. Edmund Power (Douai Abbey)
- 2004-2009 Rev. Michael Naughton (St. John's Abbey)
- 2009-2016 Most Rev. Elias R. Lorenzo (St. Mary's Abbey, Morristown, NJ)
- 2016–2024 Rt. Rev. Mauritius Wilde (Münsterschwarzach Abbey)
- 2024-Present Rev. Brendan Coffey (Glenstal Abbey)

== Burials ==
"Collegio Sant'Anselmo" has maintained a vault at the Campo Verano Cemetery beside the Basilica of St. Lawrence for burials of those affiliated with Sant'Anselmo who may have died while in Rome. The vault is located in II Quadriportico, section four, on the front row facing section three. The following have been buried in the vault (see gallery photo):

- 1894 D. Anselmus Haeusler
- 1904 Abbot Wilfridus Raynal
- 1906 Rev. Benedictus Mackey
- 1906 Rev. Adalbertus Miller
- 1906 Rev. Willibrordus Van Heteren
- 1909 Brother Vitus Slezak
- 1910 Rev. Justinus Greif
- 1920 D. Fidelis Sarbach
- 1920 Abbot Hugo Springer
- 1922 Rev. Fulgentius Sanchez
- 1933 Brother Alexius Mathian
- 1934 Rev. Hildebrandus Höpfl
- 1940 Rev. Joseph Gredt
- 1942 Rev. Anselmus Stolz
- 1947 Abbot Fidelis von Stotzingen
- 1956 D. Joseph Kofler
- 1963 Brother Pancratius Schnapp
- 1965 Rev. Guido Ferrari
- 1965 Abbot Aidanus Williams
- 1970 Rev. Viktor Warnach

== Gallery ==
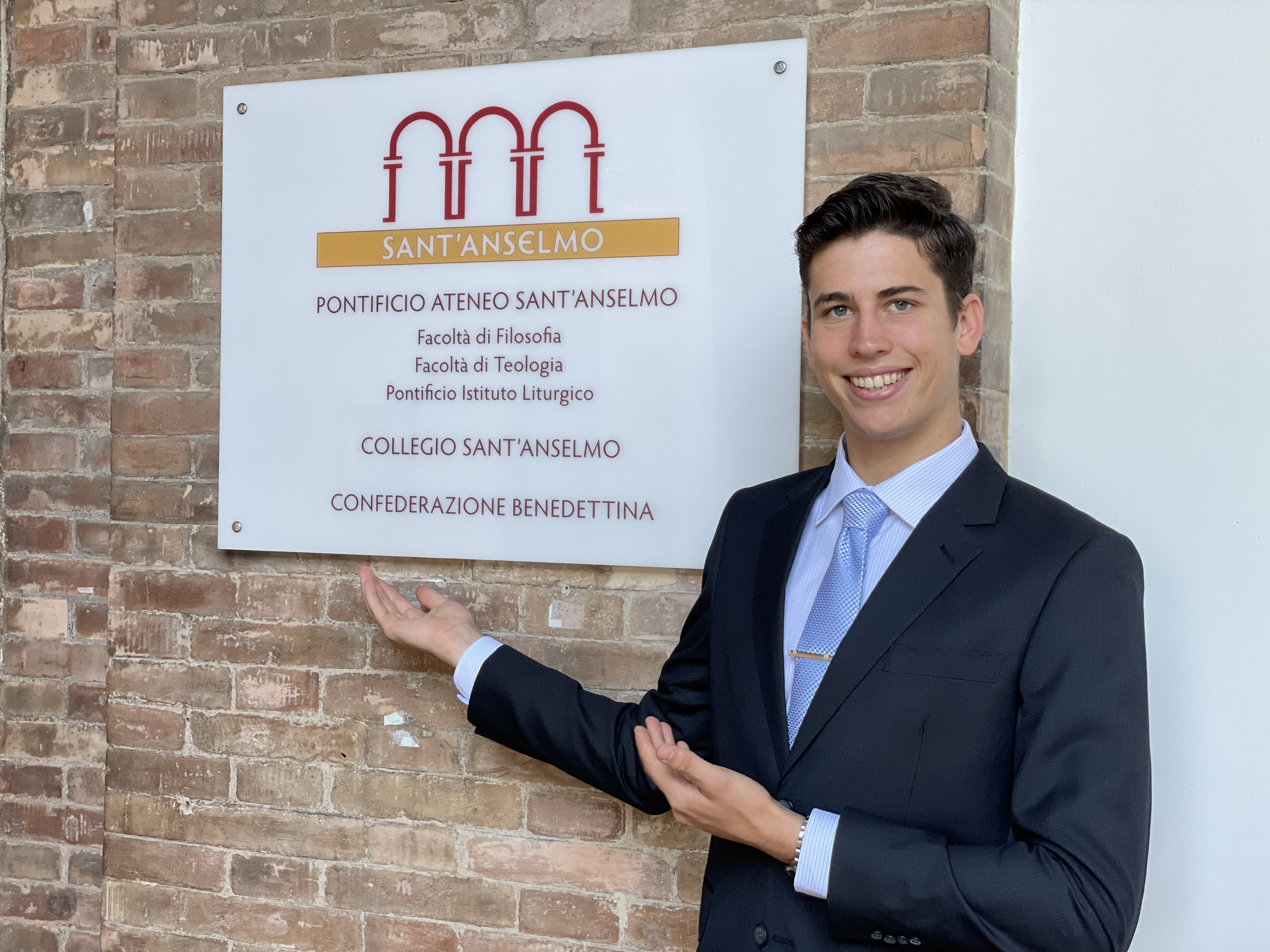

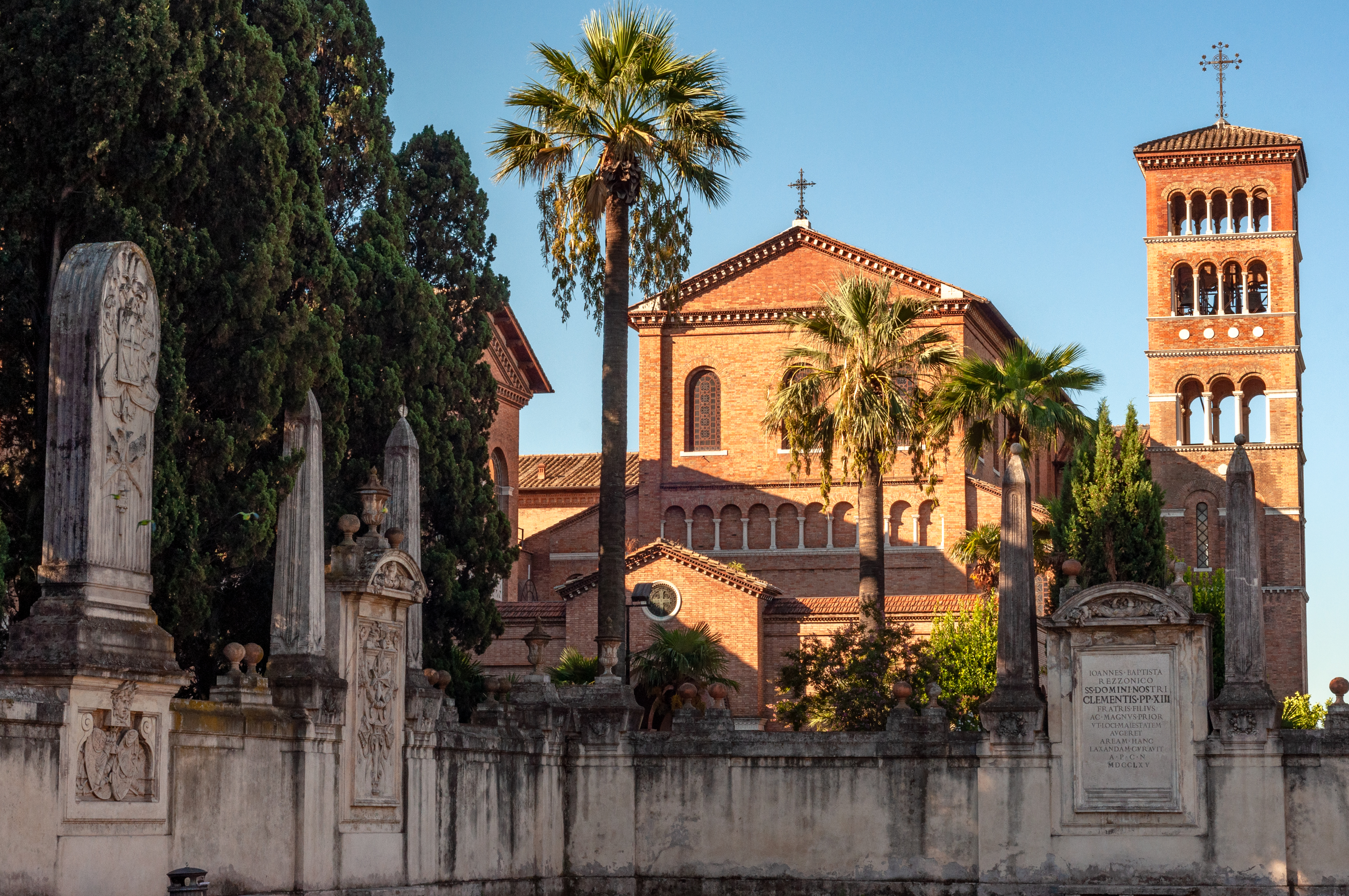

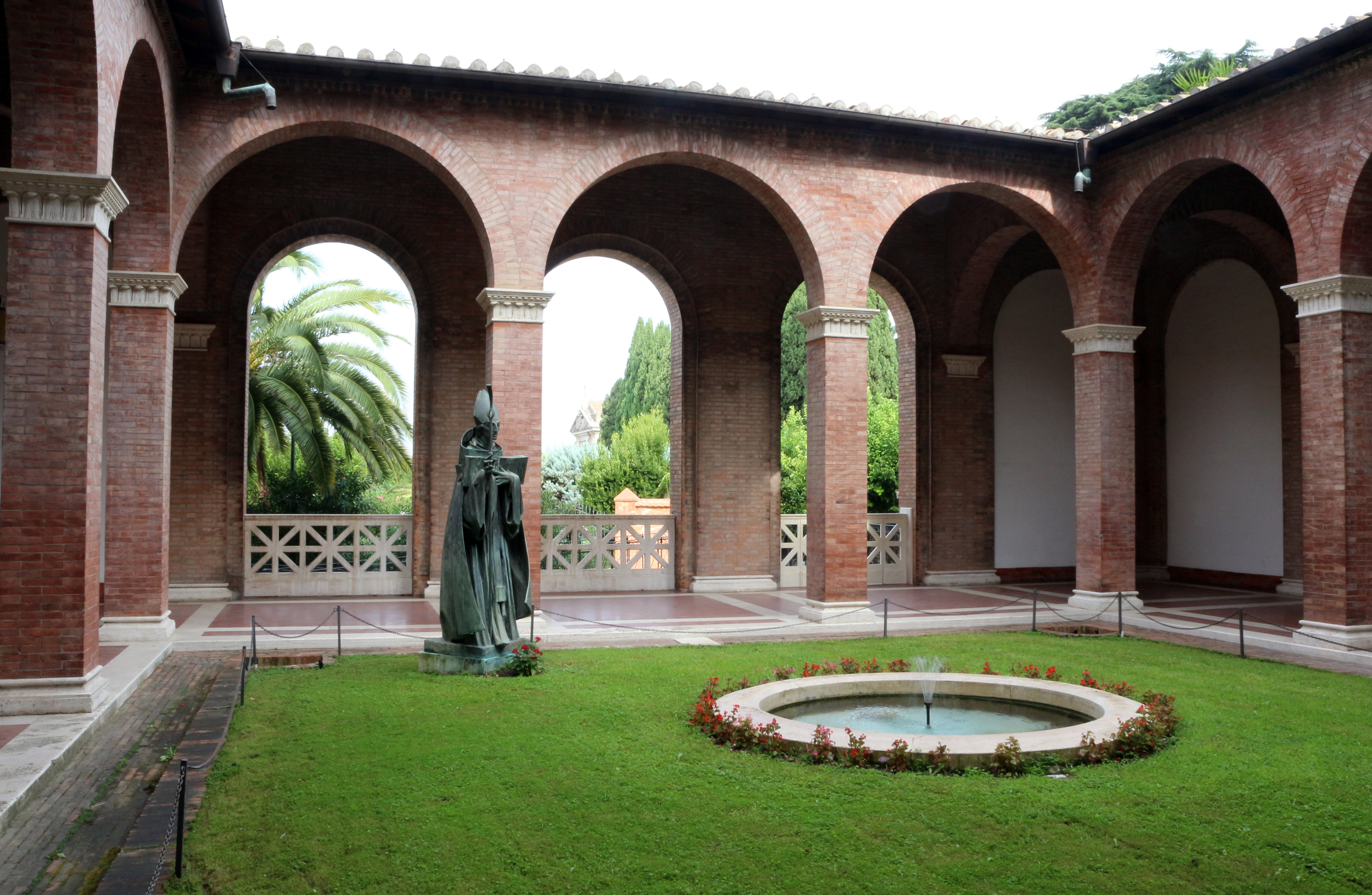

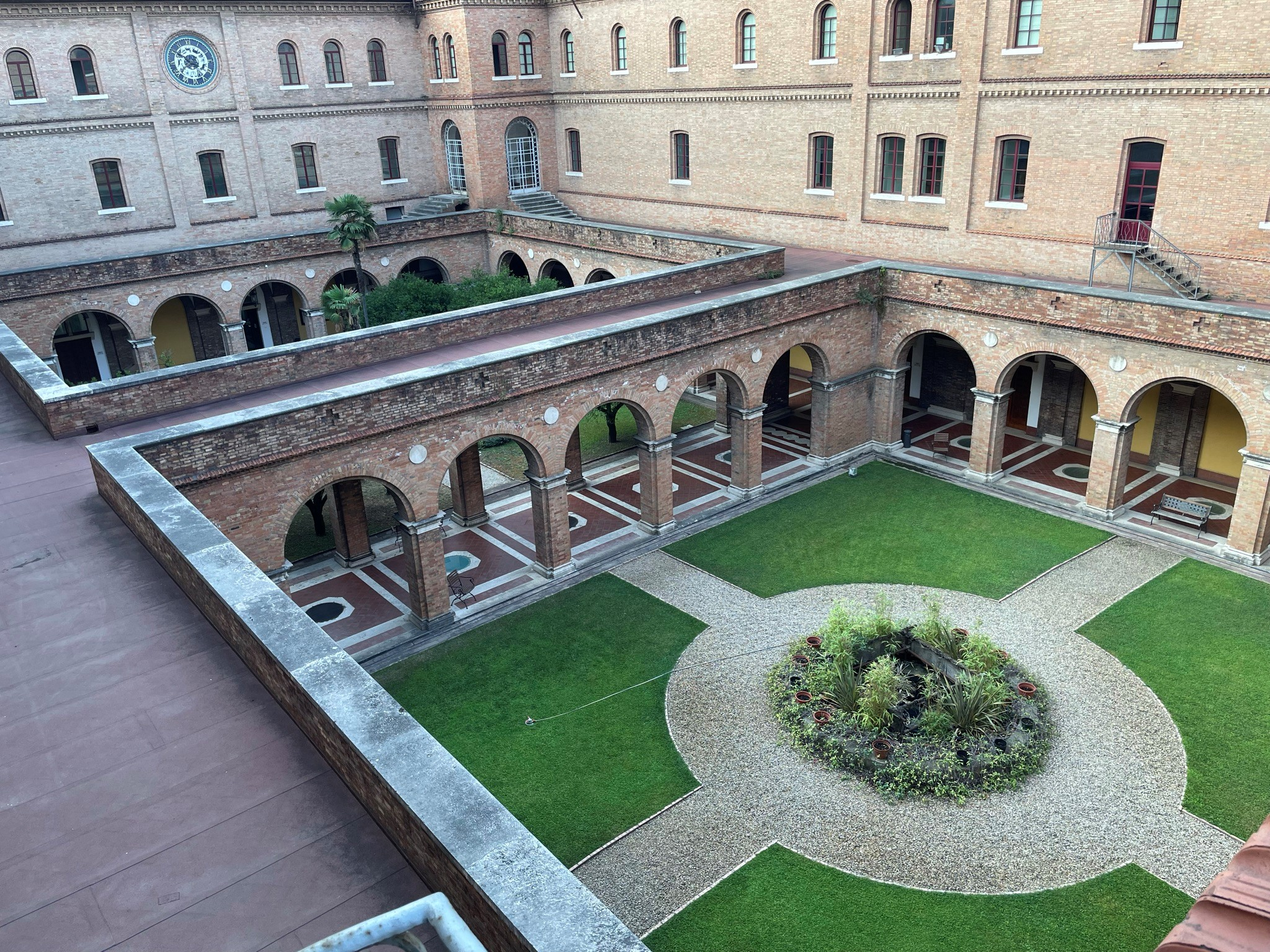

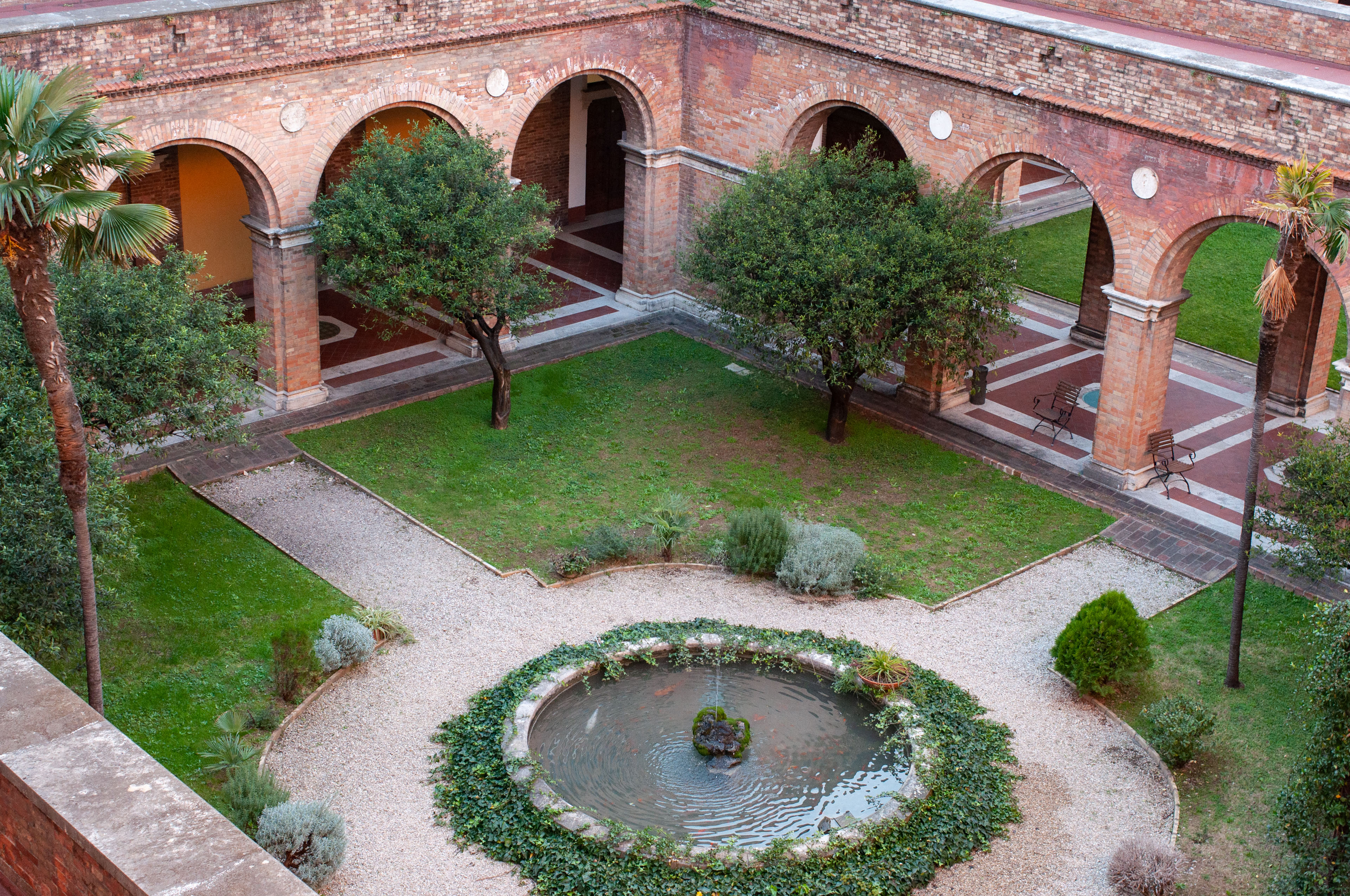

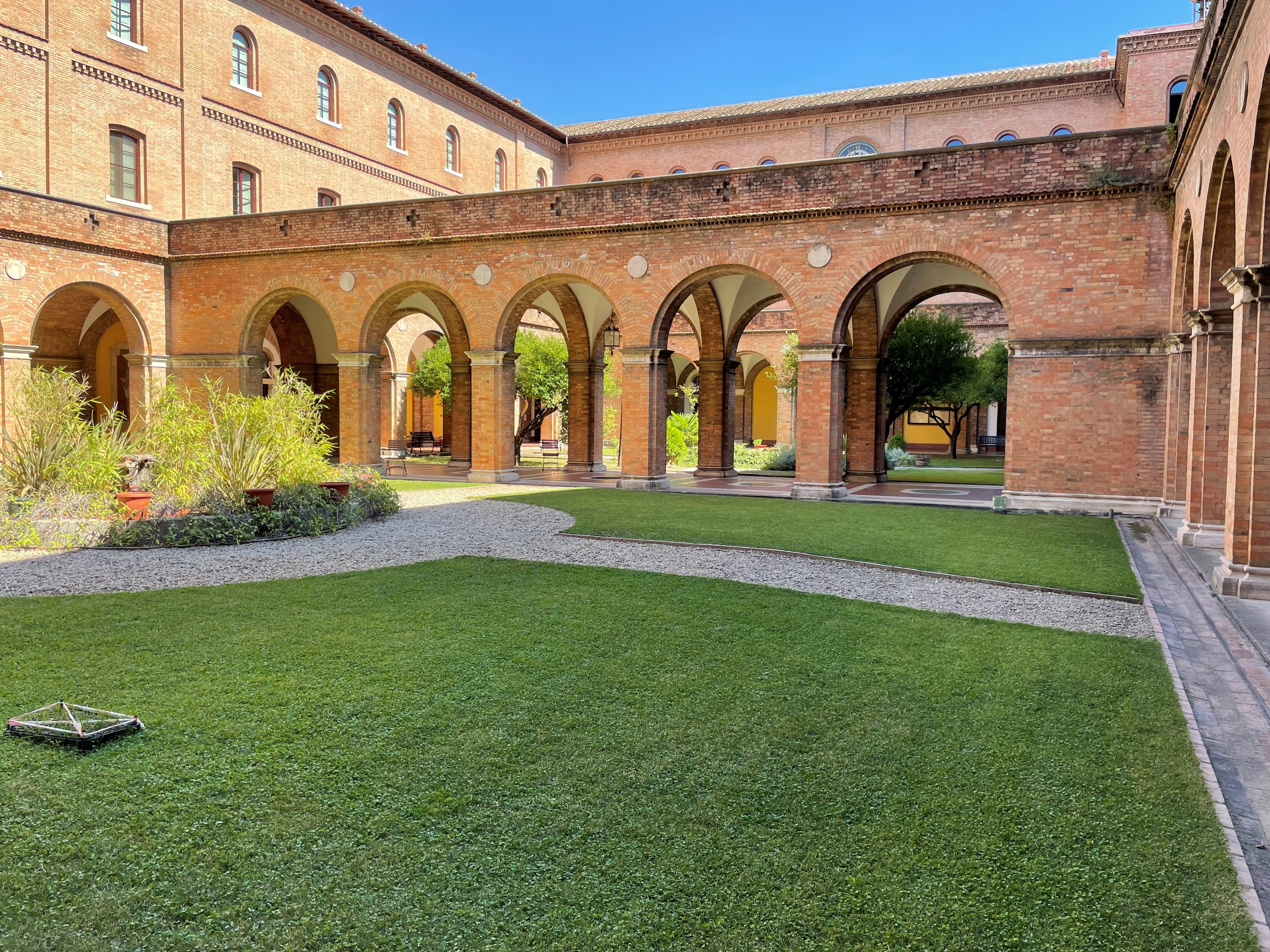

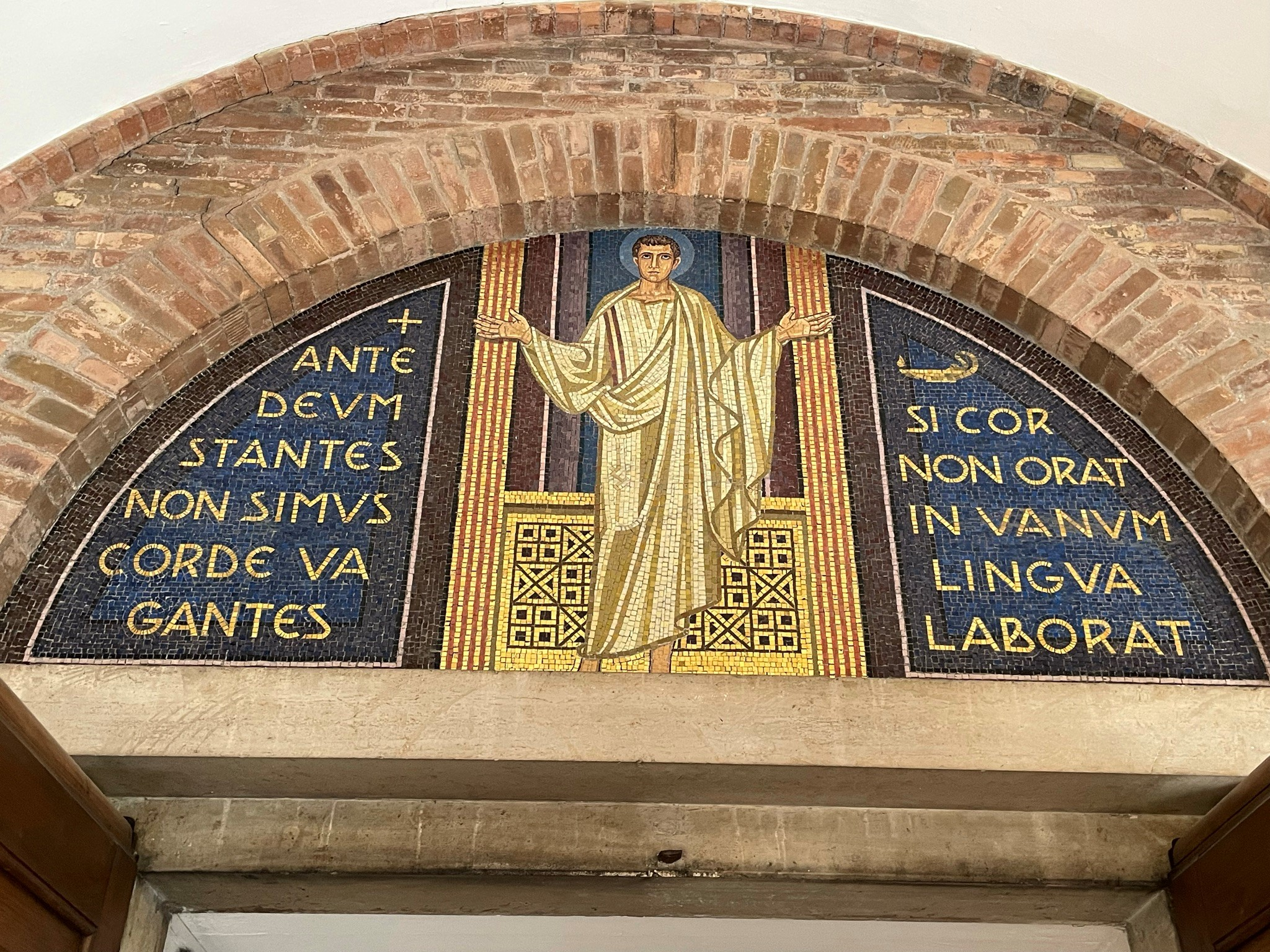

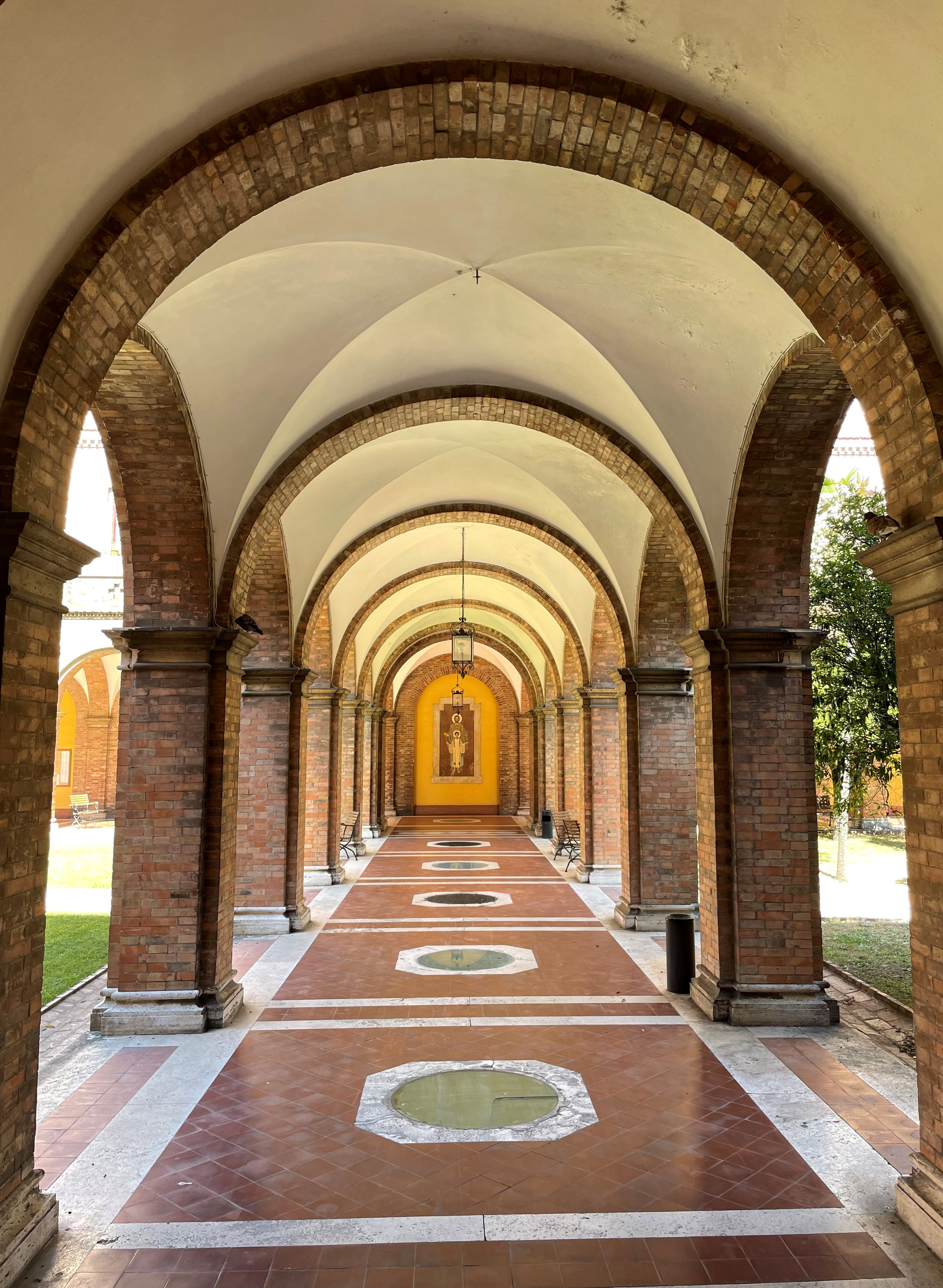

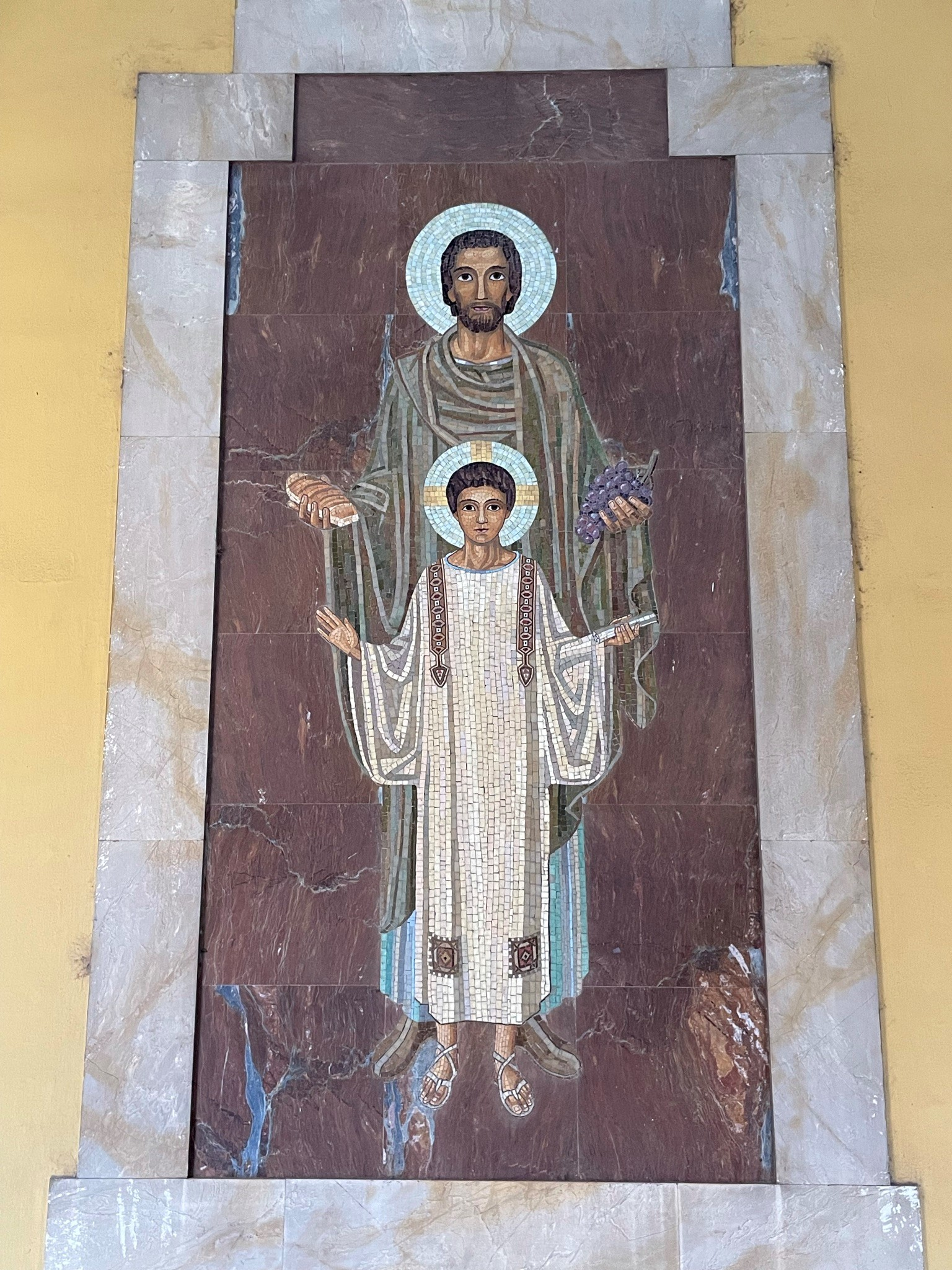

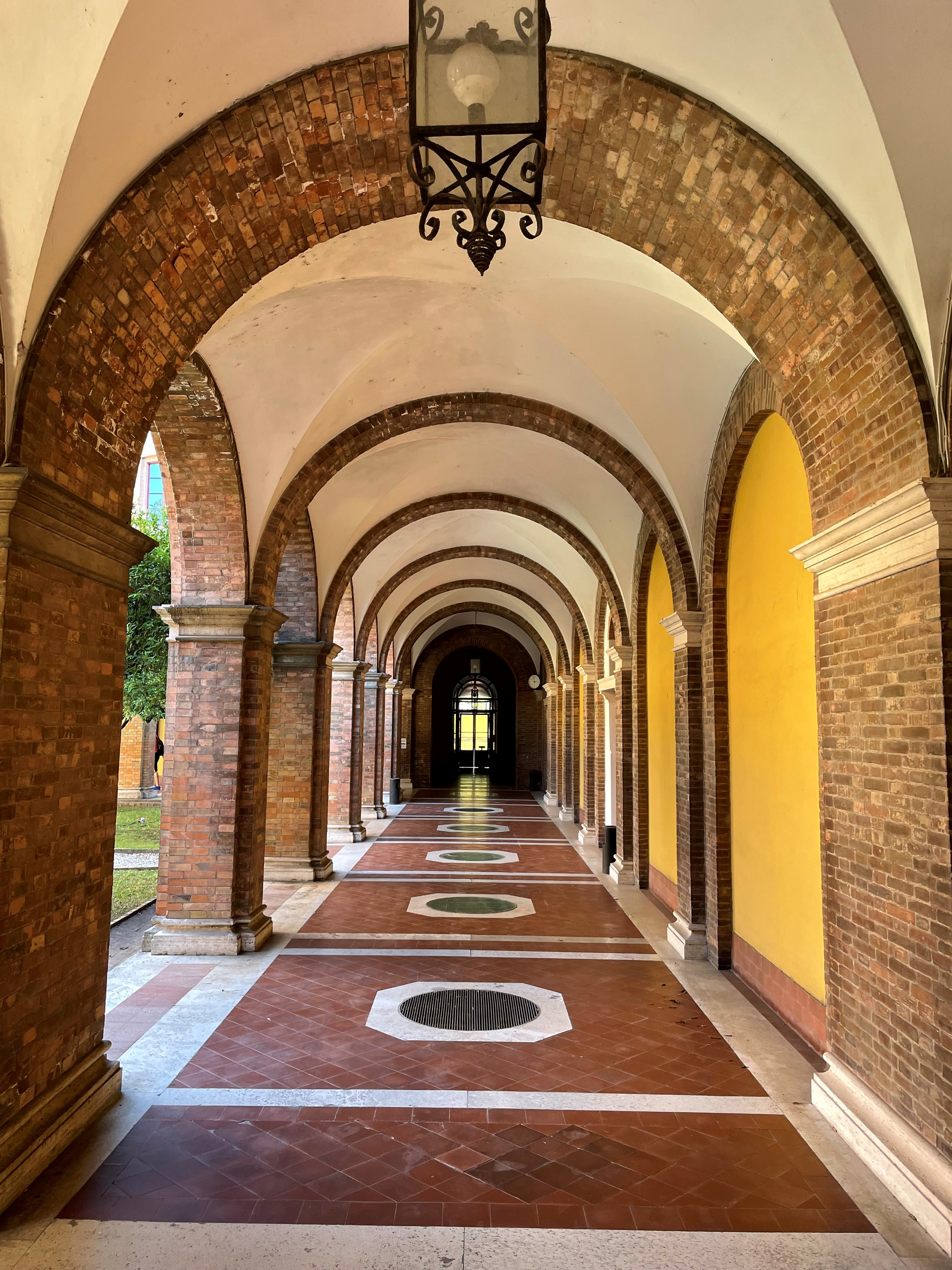

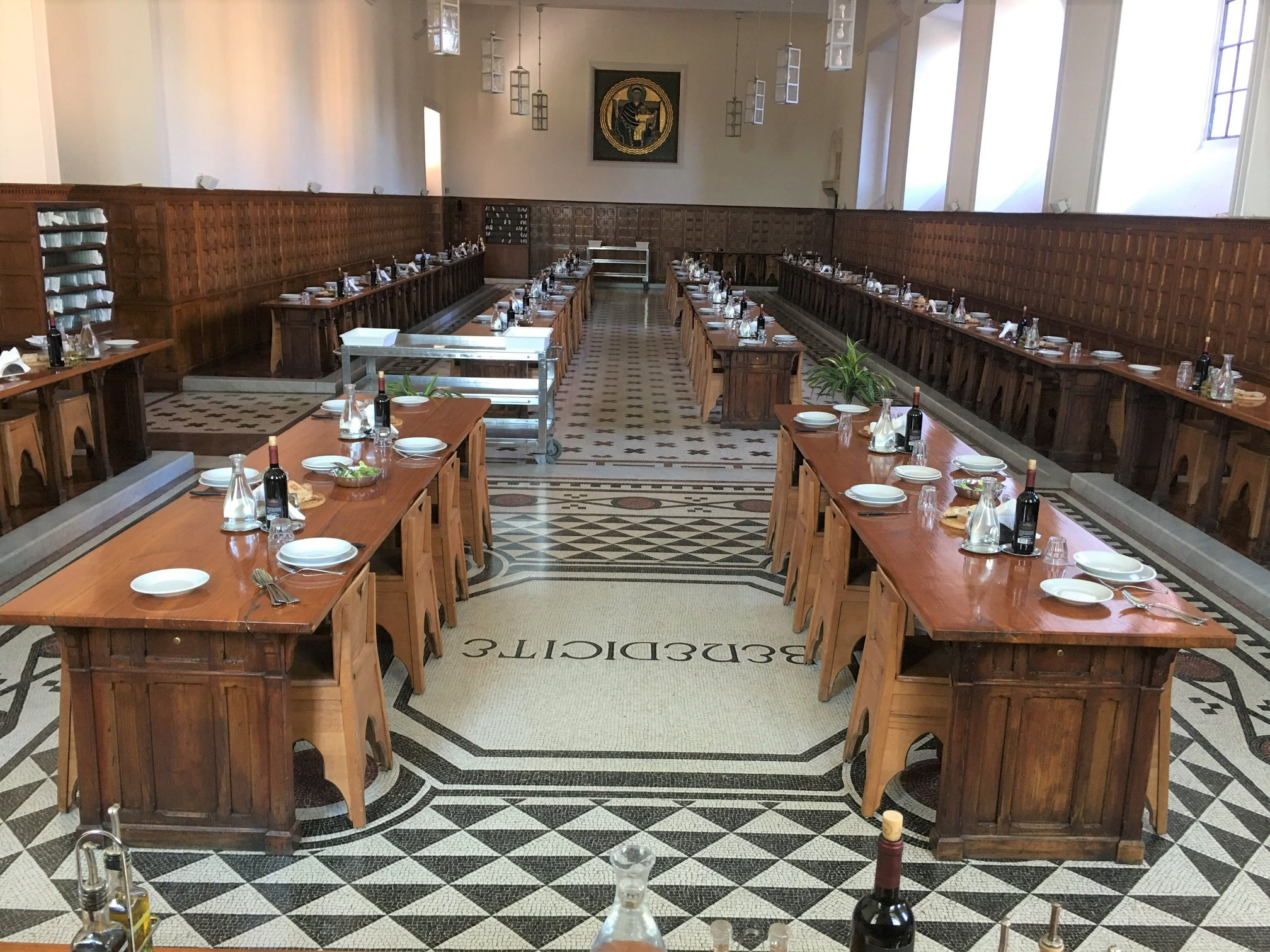

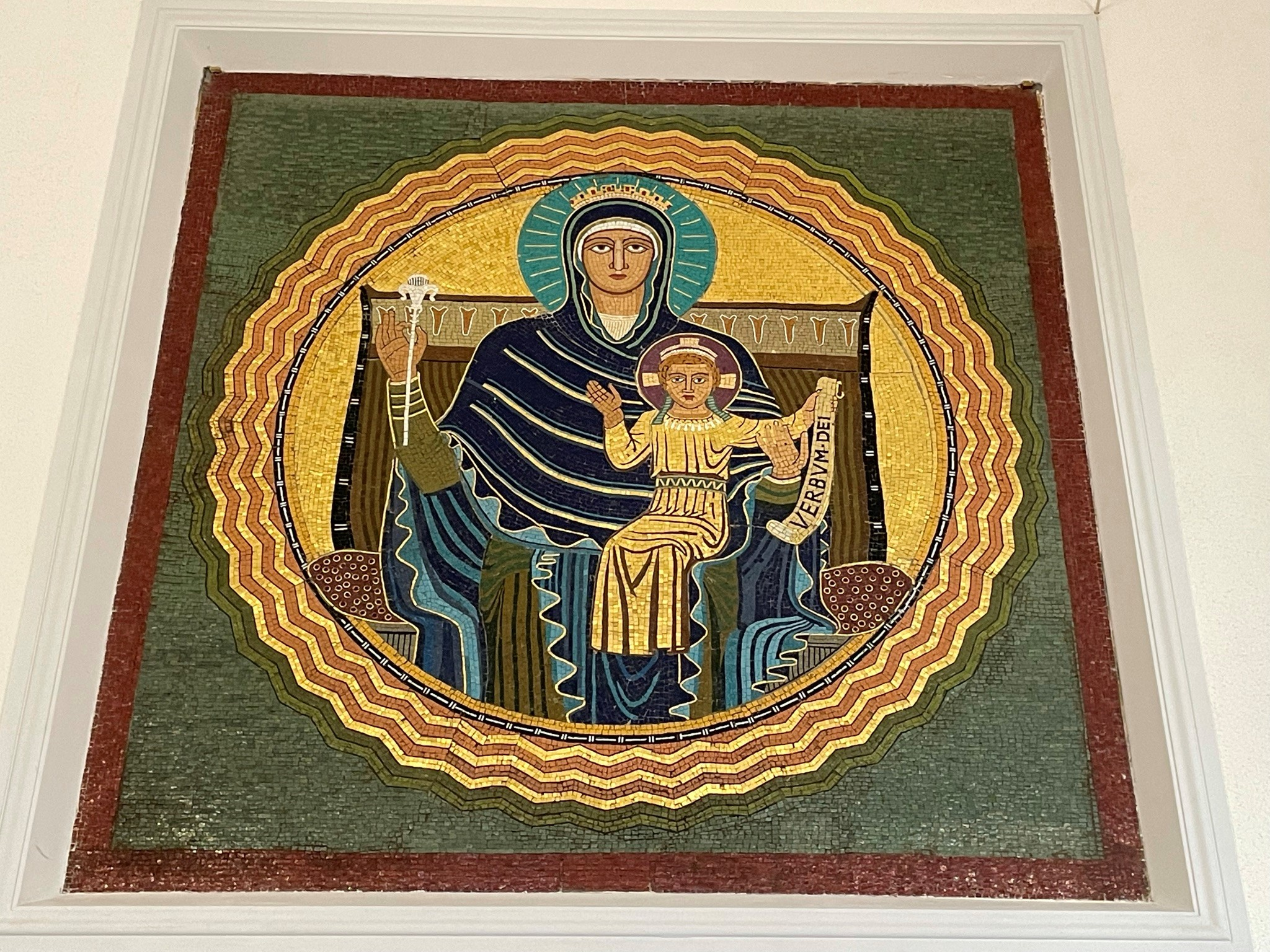

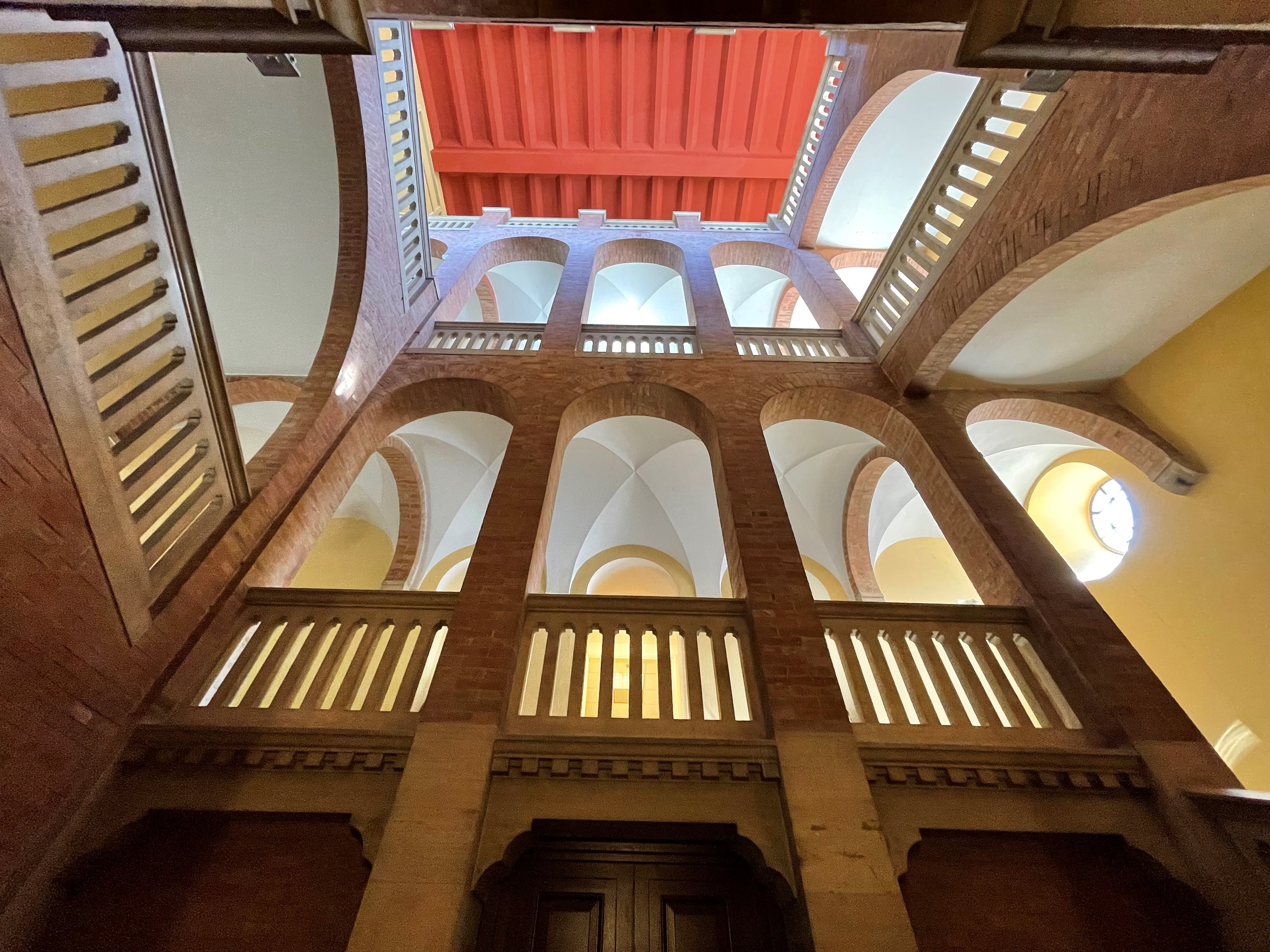

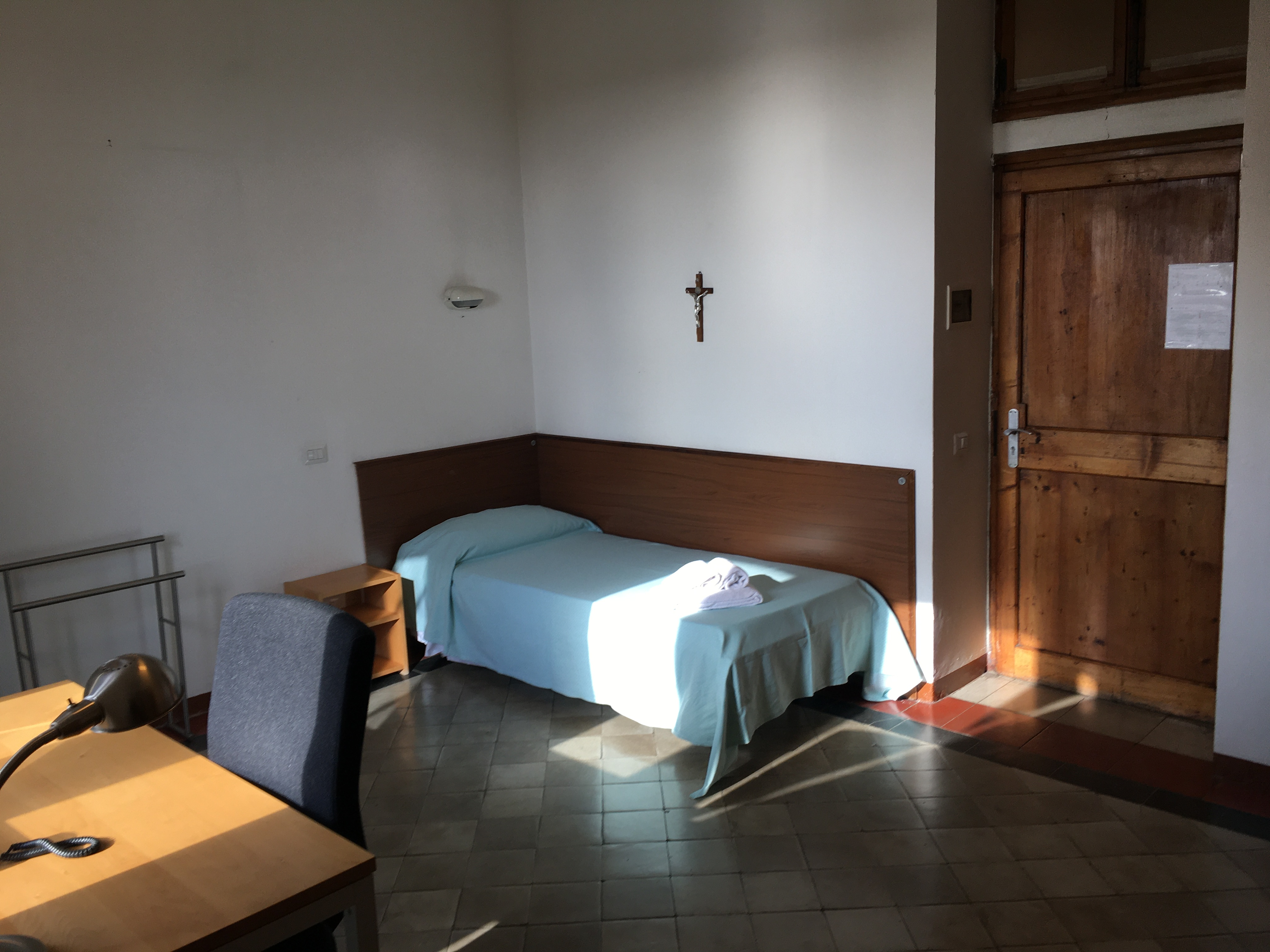

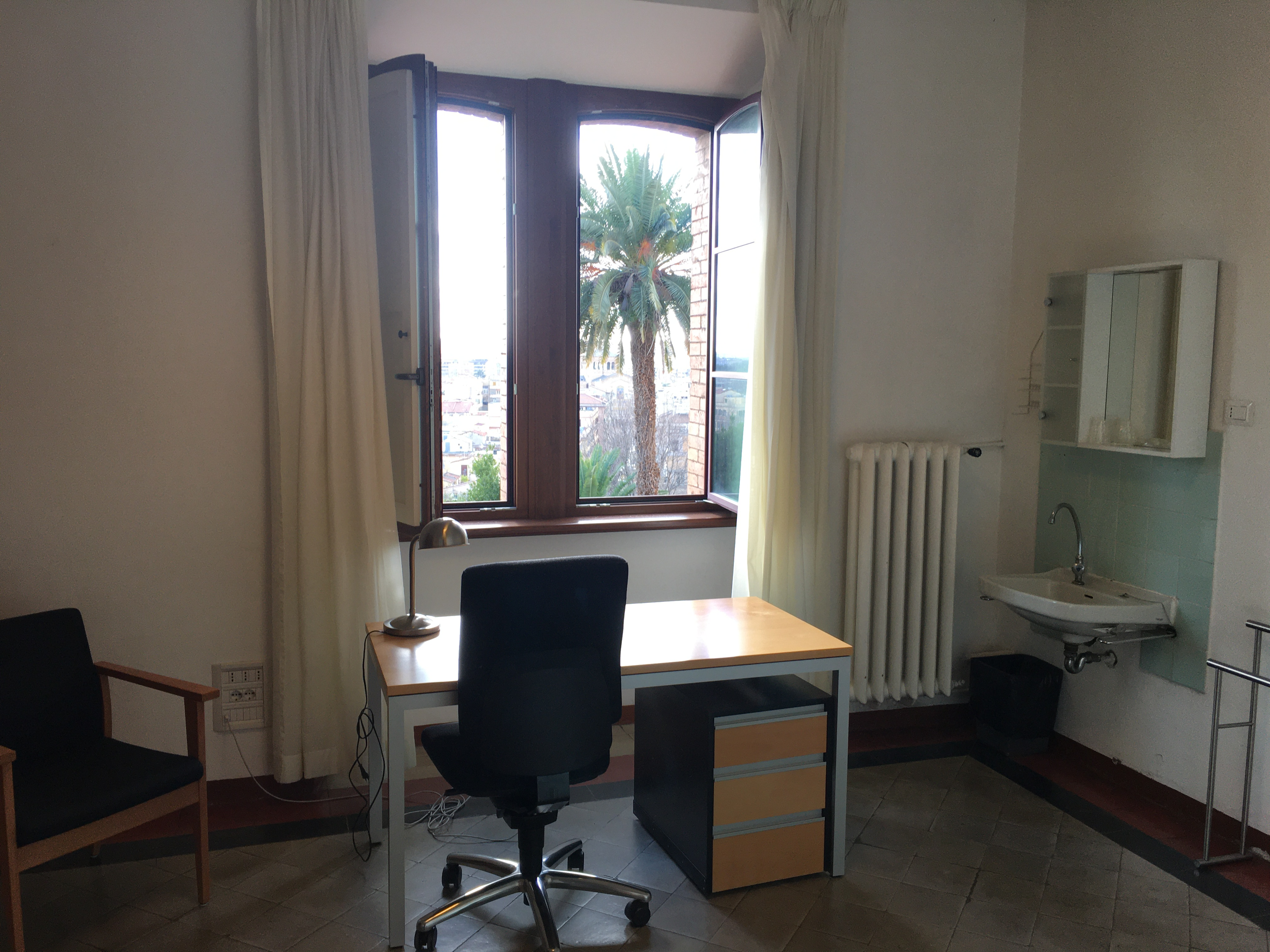

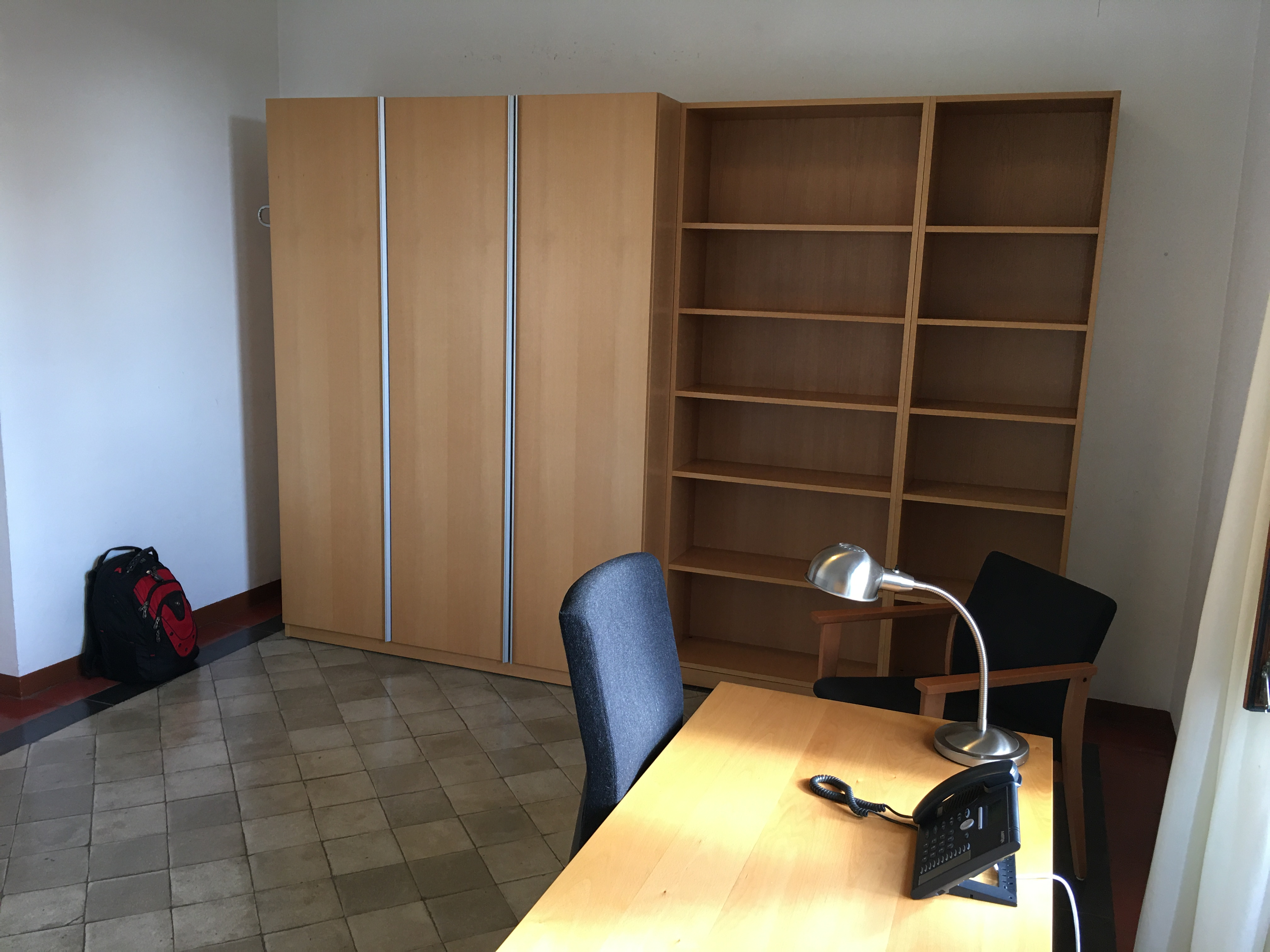

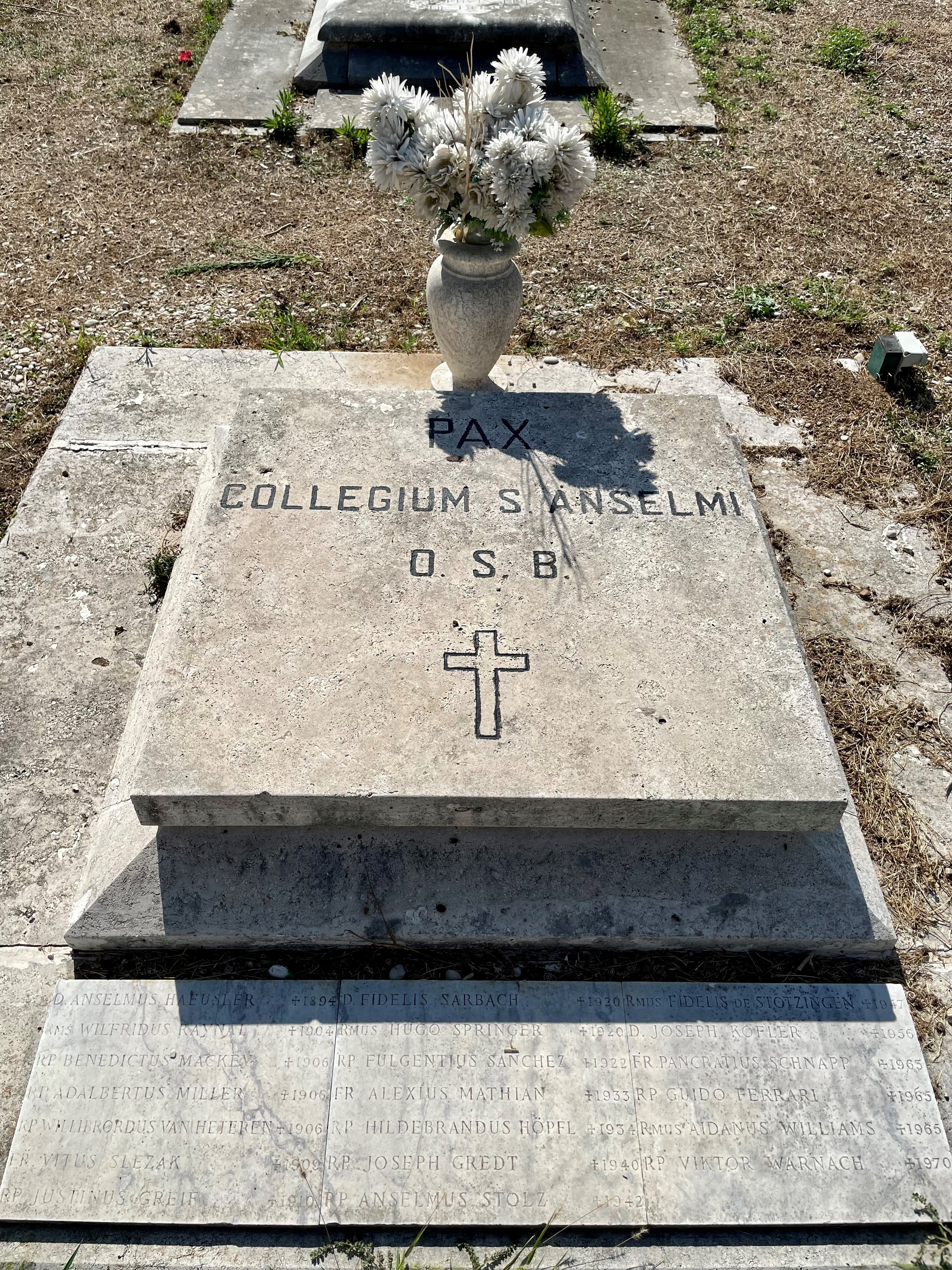

== See also ==
In addition to the "Collegio Sant'Anselmo", the complex known as "Sant'Anselmo all'Aventino" also includes the following three institutions:

- Pontifical Athenaeum of Sant'Anselmo: The Anselmianum, also known as the Pontifical Athenaeum of Saint Anselm (Italian: Pontificio Ateneo Sant'Anselmo; Latin: Pontificium Athenaeum Anselmianum), is a pontifical university in Rome associated with the Benedictines and residing at the Sant'Anselmo all'Aventino complex.
- Church of Sant'Anselmo: The area of the Sant'Anselmo all'Aventino complex in Rome open to the general public is the church. The church serves as a place of worship for the Collegio Sant'Anselmo community and the students of the Athenaeum.
- Curia of the Benedictine Confederation: The Benedictine Confederation is a union of monastic congregations that nevertheless retain their own autonomy, established by Pope Leo XIII on July 12, 1893, in his brief "Summum semper". The Confederation has its headquarters at Sant'Anselmo in Rome.
